= List of moths of Brazil =

Location of Brazil

This is a list of moths of Brazil.

== Adelidae ==
- Ceromitia aphyoda Davis & Medeiros, (São Paulo, Parana)
- Ceromitia beckeri Davis & Medeiros, 2023 (from Rio de Janeiro)
- Ceromitia braziliensis Davis & Medeiros, 2023
- Ceromitia chionocrossa Meyrick, 1921 (Rio Trombetas, Pará)
- Ceromitia concava Davis & Medeiros, 2023
- Ceromitia convexa Davis & Medeiros, 2023
- Ceromitia eccentra Meyrick, 1922 (from Obidos)
- Ceromitia exalbata Meyrick, 1921 (Rio Trombetas, Pará)
- Ceromitia fasciata Davis & Medeiros, 2023
- Ceromitia furcata Davis & Medeiros, 2023
- Ceromitia fuscata Davis & Medeiros, 2023
- Ceromitia latibasis Davis & Medeiros, 2023
- Ceromitia laticlavia Davis & Medeiros, 2023
- Ceromitia lobata Davis & Medeiros, 2023
- Ceromitia nigrifasciata Davis & Medeiros, 2023
- Ceromitia ochrodyta Meyrick, 1921
- Ceromitia ovata Davis & Medeiros, 2023
- Ceromitia pallidofascia Davis & Medeiros, 2023
- Ceromitia phaeoceros Meyrick, 1921
- Ceromitia sciographa Meyrick, 1921 (from Obidos, Para)
- Ceromitia truncata Davis & Medeiros, 2023 (Minas Gerais)
- Ceromitia unicornuta Davis & Medeiros, 2023
- Ceromitia unipectinella Davis & Medeiros, 2023 (from São Paulo)

== Agonoxenidae ==
- Microcolona transennata Meyrick, 1922
- Palaeomystella chalcopeda (Meyrick, 1931)
- Palaeomystella fernandesi Becker & Moreira, 2014
- Palaeomystella henriettiphila Becker & Adamski, 2008
- Palaeomystella oligophaga Becker & Adamski, 2008
- Palaeomystella rosaemariae Becker & Moreira, 2014
- Palaeomystella tavaresi Becker & Moreira, 2014
- Palaeomystella tibouchinae Becker & Adamski, 2008
- Pammeces crocoxysta Meyrick, 1922
- Prochola agypsota Meyrick, 1922
- Prochola basichlora Meyrick, 1922
- Prochola catacentra Meyrick, 1922
- Prochola chalcothorax Meyrick, 1932
- Prochola chloropis Meyrick, 1922
- Prochola ochromicta Meyrick, 1922
- Prochola orphnopa Meyrick, 1922
- Prochola orthobasis Meyrick, 1922
- Prochola pervallata Meyrick, 1922
- Prochola prasophanes Meyrick, 1922
- Prochola semialbata Meyrick, 1922
- Prochola subtincta Meyrick, 1922
- Zaratha macrocera (Felder & Rogenhofer, 1875)
- Zaratha pterodactylella Walker, 1864

== Alucitidae ==
- Alucita ancalopa (Meyrick, 1922)
- Alucita eudactyla (Felder, 1875)
- Alucita stephanopis (Meyrick, 1921)
- Hexeretmis pontopora Meyrick, 1934
- Prymnotomis crypsicroca Meyrick, 1931
- Prymnotomis cecidicola Moreira & Becker, 2019

== Arrhenophanidae ==
- Arrhenophanes volcanica Walsingham, 1913 (Amazonas)
- Arrhenophanes perspicilla (Stoll, 1790)
- Cnissostages oleagina Zeller, 1863
- Dysoptus argus Davis, 2003 (Para, French Guiana, Venezuela)
- Dysoptus avittus Davis, 2003 (Santa Catarina)
- Dysoptus chiquitus (Busck, 1914)
- Dysoptus denticulatus Davis, 2003
- Dysoptus pentalobus Davis, 2003 (Espirito Santo)

== Attevidae ==
- Atteva cosmogona Meyrick, 1931
- Atteva numeratrix Meyrick, 1930
- Atteva pustulella (Fabricius, 1787)
- Atteva zebrina Becker, 2009 (from Brazil)

== Batrachedridae ==
- Batrachedra nuciferae Hodges, 1966
- Ifeda perobtusa (Meyrick, 1922)

== Blastobasidae ==
- Auximobasis agrestis Meyrick, 1922 (from Para)
- Auximobasis flavida Meyrick, 1922 (from Para & Peru)
- Blastobasis anachasta Meyrick, 1931
- Blastobasis atmosema Meyrick, 1930
- Blastobasis coffeaella (Busck, 1925) (from São Paulo)
- Blastobasis commendata Meyrick, 1922 (from Para)
- Blastobasis pacalis Meyrick, 1922 (from Para, Peru, British Guyana)
- Holcocera cerradicola Adamski & Ribeiro-Costa, 2008 (from Parana)
- Holcocera chloropeda Meyrick, 1922 (from Para)
- Holcocera digesta Meyrick, 1922 (from Para)
- Holcocera percnoscia Meyrick, 1932
- Metallocrates transformata Meyrick, 1930

== Carposinidae ==
- Carposina engalactis (Meyrick) (Santa Catarina)

== Cecidosidae ==
- Cecidonius pampeanus Moreira & Gonçalves, 2017
- Dicranoses congregatella
- Oliera argentinana Brèthes, 1917

== Choreutidae ==
- Brenthia confluxana (Walker, 1863) (Amazonas)
- Brenthia chrysosperma Meyrick, 1931 (from Brazil, Tefé)
- Brenthia episotras Meyrick, 1920 (from Brazil, Obidos)
- Brenthia eriopis Meyrick, 1920 (from Brazil, Obidos)
- Brenthia ochripalpis Meyrick, 1920 (from Brazil, Rio Trombetas)
- Brenthia stenorma Meyrick, 1915 (from Parana, Brazil)
- Brenthia stimulans Meyrick, 1920 (from Brazil: Para, Obidos & Santarém)
- Brenthia stylophora Meyrick, 1920 (from Brazil, Obidos)
- Caloreas cydrota (Meyrick, 1915)
- Hemerophila albertiana (Cramer, 1781)
- Hemerophila arcigera (C. Felder, R. Felder & Rogenhofer, 1875)
- Ornarantia biferana (Walker, 1863)
- Ornarantia bigerana (Walker, 1863)
- Ornarantia canofusana (Walker, 1863)
- Ornarantia cinctipes (C. Felder, R. Felder & Rogenhofer, 1875)
- Ornarantia contrariana (Walker, 1863)
- Ornarantia tristis (C. Felder, R. Felder & Rogenhofer, 1875)
- Ornarantia velatana (Walker, 1863)
- Rhobonda gaurisana Walker, 1863
- Tortyra chalcobathra Meyrick, 1922
- Tortyra fulgens (C. Felder, R. Felder & Rogenhofer, 1875)
- Tortyra spectabilis Walker, 1863
- Tortyra violacea (C. Felder, R. Felder & Rogenhofer, 1875)
- Zodia chrysosperma (Meyrick, 1931)
- Zodia ochripalpis (Meyrick, 1920)
- Zodia plutusana (Walker, 1863)
- Zodia rutilella (Walker, 1863)

== Crambidae ==
=== Acentropinae ===
- Synclitodes decoripennis Munroe, 2012

=== Crambiinae ===
- Chilo partellus (Swinhoe)
- Chilo sacchariphagus (Bojer)
- Chilo berthellus (Schaus, 1911)
- Cervicrambus eximiellus (Zincken, 1821)
- Crambus delineatellus Hampson, 1896
- Crambus multiradiellus Hampson, 1896
- Crambus patulellus
- Crambus satrapellus Zincken, 1821
- Crambus whalleyi
- Diatraea anathericola Dyar & Heinrich, 1927
- Diatraea amnemonella Dyar, 1911
- Diatraea angustella Dyar, 1911
- Diatraea bellifactella Dyar, 1911
- Diatraea castrensis Dyar & Heinrich, 1927
- Diatraea continens Dyar, 1911
- Diatraea pallidostricta Dyar, 1911
- Diatraea saccharalis (Fabricius, 1794)
- Diatraea strigipennella Dyar, 1911
- Diatraea incomparella Dyar & Heinrich, 1927
- Diptychophora ardalia Landy & Becker, 2021
- Diptychophora diasticta Gaskin, 1986 (from Bahia)
- Diptychophora galvani Landy & Becker, 2021
- Diptychophora kuhlweinii Zeller, 1866
- Diptychophora planaltina Landy & Becker, 2021
- Diptychophora subazanalis Błeszyński, 1967
- Donacoscaptes ignitalis (Hampson, 1896)
- Donacoscaptes obliquilineellus (Hampson, 1896)
- Donacoscaptes unipunctella Bleszynski, 1961
- Euchromius minutus Schouten, 1992
- Fissicrambus orion Bleszynski, 1963 (from Amapa)
- Haplopediasia aurantilineellus (Hampson, 1896) (from São Paulo)
- Hemiptocha atratellus (Hampson, 1919)
- Mesopediasia hemixanthellus (Hampson, 1896)
- Microcrambus arcas
- Microcrambus castrella (Schaus, 1922)
- Microcrambus cyllarus
- Microcrambus grisetinctellus (Hampson, 1896)
- Microcrambus hector
- Microcrambus paucipunctellus
- Myelobia atrosparsellus (Walker, 1863)
- Myelobia bimaculata (Box, 1931)
- Myelobia biumbrata (Schaus, 1922)
- Myelobia castrellus (Schaus, 1922)
- Myelobia haplodoxa (Meyrick, 1936)
- Myelobia incanella (Hampson, 1896)
- Myelobia nigristigmellus (Hampson, 1896)
- Neoeromene felix (Meyrick, 1931)
- Neoeromene parvalis (Walker, [1866])
- Parapediasia atalanta Błeszyński, 1963
- Parapediasia cervinellus (Zeller, 1863)
- Parapediasia murinellus (Zeller, 1863)
- Parapediasia paranella Błeszyński, 1963
- Parapediasia subtilellus (Zeller, 1863)
- Platytes polyactinella Hampson, 1896
- Pseudometachilo distictellus (Hampson, 1896)
- Pseudometachilo irrectellus (Möschler, 1882)
- Supercrambus albiradialis (Hampson, 1919)
- Tortriculladia argentimaculalis (Hampson, 1919)
- Tortriculladia mignonette (Dyar, 1914)
- Vaxi jonesella (Dyar, 1913)
- Vaxi obliqua (Hampson, 1919)

=== Glaphyriinae ===
- Alatuncusia canalis (Walker, 1866)
- Alatuncusia monochromatalis Becker, 2023 (from Rondonia)
- Alatuncusia tornimaculalis Becker, 2023 (from Rondonia)
- Dichochroma muralis Forbes, 1944

=== Midilinae ===
- Dismidila abrotalis (Walker, 1859)
- Dismidila obscura Munroe, 1970
- Eupastranaia fenestrata (Ménétries, 1863)
- Eupastranaia tumidifrons (Munroe, 1970)
- Gonothyris hyaloplaga Hampson, 1896 (from Rio de Janeiro)
- Hositea punctigera Munroe, 1970
- Hositea regina Munroe, 1970
- Malleria argenteofulva Munroe, 1959
- Midila albipes (Pagenstecher, 1892)
- Midila fonteboalis Munroe, 1970 (from Amazonas)
- Midila lamia Munroe, 1970
- Midila quadrifenestrata (Herrich-Schäffer, [1858])
- Pycnarmodes auricolor Becker, 2022
- Pycnarmodes parallelographa Becker, 2022

=== Pyraustinae ===
- Anania ferruginealis
- Anania leucocraspia
- Anania lutealis
- Anania monospila
- Anania nerissalis
- Anania nullalis
- Anania otiosalis
- Hyalorista opalizalis (Guenée, 1854)
- Nehydriris excellens Munroe, 2012
- Pyrausta fieldialis
- Pyrausta flavibrunnealis
- Pyrausta haemapastalis
- Pyrausta phaeophoenica
- Pyrausta pyrocausta
- Pyrausta staiusalis
- Pyrausta suavidalis
- Pyrausta subinquinalis

=== Schoenobiinae ===
- Donacaula immanis (Hampson, 1896)
- Donacaula porrectellus (Walker, 1863) (Neotropical)
- Donacaula pulverealis (Hampson, 1919) (Neotropical)
- Donacaula semifuscalis (Hampson, 1919) (Neotropical)
- Rupela albina Becker & Solis, 1990
- Rupela bendis Heinrich, 1937
- Rupela canens Heinrich, 1937
- Rupela cornigera Heinrich, 1937
- Rupela drusilla Heinrich, 1937
- Rupela edusa Heinrich, 1937
- Rupela gaia Heinrich, 1937
- Rupela horridula Heinrich, 1937
- Rupela imitativa Heinrich, 1937
- Rupela jana Heinrich, 1937
- Rupela labeosa Heinrich, 1937
- Rupela leucatea (Zeller, 1863)
- Rupela monstrata Heinrich, 1937
- Rupela nereis Heinrich, 1937
- Rupela nivea Walker, 1863
- Rupela pallidula Heinrich, 1937
- Rupela procula Heinrich, 1937
- Rupela saetigera Heinrich, 1937
- Rupela scitula Heinrich, 1937
- Rupela spinifera Heinrich, 1937
- Rupela tinctella Walker, 1863
- Schoenobius damienella (Schaus, 1922)
- Schoenobius endochalybella (Hampson, 1896)
- Schoenobius irrorata (Hampson, 1919)
- Schoenobius parabolistes Meyrick, 1936 (from Rio Grande do Sul)
- Schoenobius sagitella (Hampson, 1896)
- Schoenobius vittatalis (Hampson, 1919)

=== Spilomelinae ===
- Agathodes designalis Guenée, 1854
- Bradina agraphalis (Guenée, 1854)
- Bradina antenoralis (Walker, 1859)
- Bradina desumptalis (Walker, 1866) (from Tefé)
- Bradina liodesalis (Walker, 1859)
- Coremata stigmatalis
- Cryptobotys zoilusalis (from Bahia)
- Duponchelia fovealis Zeller
- Desmia jonesalis Schaus, 1920 (from Sao Paulo)
- Diaphania hyalinata (Linnaeus, 1767)
- Diaphania nitidalis (Stoll, 1781)
- Eurrhyparodes lygdamis H. Druce, 1902
- Gonocausta voralis (Schaus, 1920) (from Sao Paulo)
- Hartitalodes pharaxalis
- Herpetogramma bipunctalis (Fabricius, 1794)
- Herpetogramma circumflexalis
- Herpetogramma infuscalis
- Herpetogramma phaeopteralis (Guenée, 1854)
- Herpetogramma schausi Munroe, 1995
- Herpetogramma servalis Lederer, 1863
- Liopasia andrealis Dognin, 1910
- Loxomorpha cambogialis (Guenée, 1854)
- Microthyris anormalis (Guenée, 1854)
- Neomabra serratilinealis
- Neoleucinodes elegantalis (Guenée, 1854)
- Omiodes indicata (Fabricius, 1775)
- Orphanostigma haemorrhoidalis (Guenée, 1854)
- Palpita braziliensis
- Palpita flegia (Cramer, 1777)
- Palpita forficifera Munroe, 1959
- Palpita persimilis
- Palpita seitzialis
- Palpita travassosi
- Palpita trifurcata
- Patania silicalis (Guenée, 1854)
- Penestola bufalis (Guenée, 1854)
- Piletocera albicilialis
- Pilocrocis ramentalis Lederer, 1863
- Pilocrocis dentilinealis
- Pilocrocis gillippusalis
- Pilocrocis lactealis
- Polygrammodes runicalis Guenée, 1854 (from Santa Catarina)
- Polygrammodes semirufa Hampson, 1913 (from Sao Paulo)
- Polygrammodes herminealis Schaus, 1920 (from Parana)
- Polygrammodes supremalis Schaus, 1920 (from Parana)
- Psara polypaetalis Schaus, 1920 (from Sao Paulo)
- Rhectocraspeda periusalis (Walker, 1859)
- Samea calonalis Walker, 1859
- Samea castellalis Guenée, 1854
- Samea ecclesialis Guenée, 1854
- Samea multiplicalis (Guenée, 1854)
- Samea obliteralis Walker, 1866
- Samea similalis Hampson, 1912
- Samea sylvialis (Walker, 1859)
- Sisyracera inabsconsalis (Möschler, 1890)
- Steniodes gelliasalis (Walker, 1859)
- Syllepte aechmisalis
- Syllepte amissalis
- Syllepte belialis
- Syllepte brunnescens
- Syllepte coelivitta
- Syllepte confusalis Becker, 2023 (São Paulo)
- Syllepte cyanea
- Syllepte dioptalis
- Syllepte incomptalis Hübner, 1823
- Syllepte laticalis
- Syllepte mnemusalis
- Syllepte pactolalis
- Syllepte philetalis
- Syllepte scripturalis
- Syllepte striginervalis
- Syllepte sororalis Becker, 2023 (from Rondônia)
- Synclera jarbusalis
- Syngamia florella (Stoll in Cramer & Stoll)
- Terastia meticulosalis Guenée, 1854

== Coleophoridae ==
- Palaeomystella chalcopeda (Meyrick, 1931)
- Palaeomystella fernandesi Becker & Moreira, 2014
- Palaeomystella henriettiphila Becker & Adamski, 2008
- Palaeomystella oligophaga Becker & Adamski, 2008
- Palaeomystella rosaemariae Becker & Moreira, 2014
- Palaeomystella tavaresi Becker & Moreira, 2014
- Palaeomystella tibouchinae Becker & Adamski, 2008

== Cosmopterigidae ==
- Ascalenia revelata Meyrick, 1922 (from Para)
- Cosmopterix ananke Koster, 2010
- Cosmopterix attenuatella (Walker, 1864)
- Cosmopterix beckeri Koster, 2010
- Cosmopterix callichalca Meyrick, 1922
- Cosmopterix chaldene Koster, 2010
- Cosmopterix dapifera Hodges, 1962
- Cosmopterix diaphora Walsingham, 1909
- Cosmopterix erasmia Meyrick, 1915
- Cosmopterix euanthe Koster, 2010
- Cosmopterix euporie Koster, 2010
- Cosmopterix harpalyke Koster, 2010
- Cosmopterix helike Koster, 2010
- Cosmopterix hermippe Koster, 2010
- Cosmopterix himalia Koster, 2010
- Cosmopterix inaugurata Meyrick, 1922
- Cosmopterix interfracta Meyrick, 1922
- Cosmopterix isotoma Meyrick, 1915
- Cosmopterix iocaste Koster, 2010
- Cosmopterix isotoma Meyrick, 1915
- Cosmopterix lummyae Koster, 2010
- Cosmopterix lysithea Koster, 2010
- Cosmopterix metis Koster, 2010
- Cosmopterix mneme Koster, 2010
- Cosmopterix nieukerkeni Koster, 2010
- Cosmopterix orthosie Koster, 2010
- Cosmopterix pimmaarteni Koster, 2010
- Cosmopterix pyrozela Meyrick, 1922
- Cosmopterix taygete Koster, 2010
- Cosmopterix teligera Meyrick, 1915
- Cosmopterix themisto Koster, 2010
- Cosmopterix thelxinoe Koster, 2010
- Cosmopterix thyone Koster, 2010
- Cosmopterix thrasyzela Meyrick, 1915
- Harpograptis eucharacta (Meyrick)
- Microcolona transennata Meyrick, 1922
- Nicanthes rhodoclea Meyrick, 1928
- Pammeces crocoxysta Mevrick, 1022,
- Pebobs isonoe Koster, 2010
- Prochola agypsota Meyrick, 1922
- Prochola basichlora Meyrick, 1922
- Prochola catacentra Meyrick, 1922
- Prochola chloropis Meyrick, 1922
- Prochola orphnopa Meyrick, 1922
- Prochola orthobasis Meyrick, 1922
- Prochola pervallata Meyrick, 1922
- Prochola prasophanes Meyrick, 1922
- Prochola semialbata Meyrick, 1922
- Prochola subtincta Meyrick, 1922
- Stilbosis argyritis Meyrick, 1922 (from Rio Trombetas)
- Stilbosis sexgutella (Walker, 1864)
- Triclonella albicellata (Meyrick, 1931)
- Triclonella citrocarpa (Meyrick, 1931)
- Walshia pentapyrga (Meyrick, 1922)

== Depressariidae ==
- Antaeotricha acrograpta (Meyrick, 1915)
- Antaeotricha addon (Busck, 1911)
- Antaeotricha adjunctella (Walker, 1864)
- Antaeotricha aerinotata (Butler, 1877)
- Antaeotricha aglypta Meyrick, 1925 (Tefé)
- Antaeotricha affinis Felder & Rogenhofer, 1875
- Antaeotricha albifrons Zeller, 1877
- Antaeotricha albilimbella (Felder & Rogenhofer, 1875)
- Antaeotricha albitincta (Meyrick, 1930)
- Antaeotricha amphilyta Meyrick, 1916
- Antaeotricha amphizyga Meyrick, 1930
- Antaeotricha aratella (Walker, 1864
- Antaeotricha argocorys (Meyrick, 1931)
- Antaeotricha basiferella (Walker, 1864)
- Antaeotricha basirubrella (Walker, 1864)
- Antaeotricha bicolor (Zeller, 1839)
- Antaeotricha binubila Zeller, 1854
- Antaeotricha bipupillata Meyrick, 1930
- Antaeotricha bracatingae (Köhler, 1943)
- Antaeotricha carbasea (Meyrick, 1915) (Novo Friburgo)
- Antaeotricha cleopatra
- Antaeotricha navicularis
- Antaeotricha nephelocyma
- Antaeotricha neurographa
- Antaeotricha nitescens
- Antaeotricha nitidorella
- Antaeotricha notogramma
- Antaeotricha notosaris
- Antaeotricha ogmolopha
- Antaeotricha orgadopa
- Antaeotricha orthophaea
- Antaeotricha orthriopa
- Antaeotricha pallicosta
- Antaeotricha percnocarpa
- Antaeotricha phaselodes
- Antaeotricha planicoma
- Antaeotricha plesistia
- Antaeotricha praecisa
- Antaeotricha pyrgota
- Antaeotricha pyrobathra
- Antaeotricha refractrix
- Antaeotricha resiliens
- Antaeotricha sciospila
- Antaeotricha sellifera
- Antaeotricha semicinerea
- Antaeotricha semisignella
- Antaeotricha serarcha
- Antaeotricha sterrhomitra
- Antaeotricha stringens
- Antaeotricha stygeropa
- Antaeotricha synercta
- Antaeotricha teleosema
- Antaeotricha tetrapetra
- Antaeotricha tibialis
- Antaeotricha tornogramma
- Antaeotricha tractrix
- Antaeotricha tricapsis
- Antaeotricha tripustulella
- Antaeotricha trisinuata
- Antaeotricha tritogramma
- Antaeotricha umbriferella
- Antaeotricha unisecta
- Antaeotricha xanthopetala
- Antaeotricha xuthosaris
- Baeonoma mastodes Meyrick, 1916
- Chlamydastis acronitis (Busck, 1911)
- Chlamydastis amblystoma (Meyrick, 1936) (from Rio Grande do Sul)
- Chlamydastis arenaria (Walsingham, 1913)
- Chlamydastis bifida (Meyrick, 1916)
- Chlamydastis byssophanes (Meyrick, 1926)
- Chlamydastis chionoptila (Meyrick, 1926)
- Chlamydastis chlorosticta (Meyrick, 1913)
- Chlamydastis deflexa (Meyrick, 1916)
- Gonioterma anna Busck, 1911
- Gonioterma bolistis (Meyrick, 1925) (from Tefé)
- Gonioterma burmanniana (Stoll, [1782])
- Gonioterma chlorina (Kearfott, 1911) (from São Paulo)
- Gonioterma expansa (Meyrick, 1915) (from Petrópolis)
- Gonioterma exquisita Duckworth, 1964 (from Minas Gerais)
- Gonioterma gubernata (Meyrick, 1915)
- Gonioterma ignobilis (Zeller, 1854)
- Gonioterma indecora (Zeller, 1854)
- Gonioterma phortax Meyrick, 1915
- Hastamea argentidorsella (Busck, 1911)
- Macrocirca moseri Becker, 2023 (southern Brazil)
- Macrocirca strabo (Meyrick, 1931)
- Philtronoma roseicorpus (Dognin, 1910)
- Stenoma dissimilis Kearfott, 1911

== Elachistidae ==
- Orthiostola citharoeda Meyrick, 1928
- Orthiostola tympanista Meyrick, 1928

== Epermeniidae ==
- Epermenia brasiliana Gaedike & Becker, 1989
- Parochromolopis bicolor Gaedike & Becker, 1989
- Parochromolopis fuscocostata Gaedike & Becker, 1989
- Parochromolopis parva Gaedike & Becker, 1989
- Parochromolopis syncrata (Meyrick, 1921) (from Para and Peru)

== Erebidae ==
=== Arctiinae ===
- Amaxia collaris
- Amaxia consistens
- Amaxia corata
- Amaxia disconsistens
- Amaxia egaensis
- Amaxia flavipuncta
- Amaxia hebe
- Amaxia kennedyi
- Amaxia perapyga
- Amaxia pseudodyuna
- Amaxia pyga
- Halysidota baritioides (Rothschild, 1909) (from Amazonas)
- Halysidota brasiliensis Rothschild, 1909 (from Paraná)
- Halysidota cinctipes (Grote, 1865)
- Halysidota interlineata (Walker, 1855)
- Halysidota interstriata (Hampson, 1901) (from Paraná)
- Halysidota orientalis (Rothschild, 1909)
- Halysidota pearsoni Watson, 1980 (from Santa Catarina)
- Halysidota pectenella Watson, 1980
- Halysidota rusca (Schaus, 1896) (from São Paulo)
- Halysidota ruscheweyhi Dyar, 1912
- Halysidota striata (Jones, 1908) (from Paraná)
- Halysidota steinbachi (Rothschild, 1909)
- Halysidota torniplaga Reich, 1935 (from Santa Catarina)
- Hypercompe abdominalis(Walker, [1865])
- Hypercompe albiscripta (H. Druce, 1901)
- Hypercompe brasiliensis (Oberthür, 1881)
- Hypercompe campinasa (Schaus, 1938)
- Hypercompe castronis (Strand, 1919)
- Hypercompe contexta (Oberthür, 1881)
- Hypercompe cunigunda (Stoll, [1781])
- Hypercompe detecta (Oberthür, 1881)
- Hypercompe dognini (Rothschild, 1910)
- Hypercompe ganglio (Oberthür, 1881)
- Hypercompe hambletoni (Schaus, 1938)
- Hypercompe heterogena (Oberthür, 1881)
- Hypercompe jaguarina (Schaus, 1921)
- Hypercompe kennedyi (Rothschild, 1910)
- Hypercompe marcescens (Felder & Rogenhofer, 1874)
- Hypercompe mus (Oberthür, 1881)
- Hypercompe muzina (Oberthür, 1881)
- Hypercompe nigriloba (Hulstaert, 1924)
- Hypercompe orbiculata (Oberthür, 1881)
- Hypercompe turruptianoides (Rothschild, 1910)
- Idalus agastus (Dyar, 1910)
- Niaca curvimargo Walker, 1855
- Paracles lateralis (Walker)

=== Erebinae ===
- Anticarsia gemmatalis Hübner, 1818

=== Herminiinae ===
- Aristaria cellulalis Guenée, 1854
- Aristaria conspicua Schaus, 1906 (from Rio de Janeiro)
- Carteris proliferalis (Walker, [1859])
- Bleptina aeatusalis Walker, 1859 (from Rio de Janeiro)
- Bleptina albidiscalis Warren, 1889 (from Amazonas)
- Bleptina bogesalis Walker, 1859 (from Rio de Janeiro)
- Bleptina caradrinalis Guenée, 1854
- Bleptina clara Schaus, 1906 (from Parana)
- Bleptina confusalis Guenée, 1854
- Bleptina ophelasalis Walker, 1859
- Bleptina pollesalis Walker, 1859 (from Rio de Janeiro)
- Bleptina styrusalis Walker, 1859 (from Rio de Janeiro)
- Bleptina syrnialis Guenée, 1854 (from Rio de Janeiro)
- Cloniatarphes carunalis Schaus, 1916
- Corynitis penicillalis Geyer, 1832
- Coremagnatha orionalis (Walker, [1859])
- Dectocraspedon braziliensis Schaus, 1916
- Dectocraspedon latefasciata Schaus, 1916
- Dectocraspedon lichenea Hampson
- Dectocraspedon obtusalis Schaus, 1916
- Dogninades petrae Lödl, 2001 (from Parana)
- Gustiana abditalis (Walker, [1859])
- Heterogramma circumflexalis Guenée, 1854
- Hyponeuma taltula (Schaus, 1904)
- Lascoria alucitalis (Guenée, 1854)
- Lascoria dulcena (Schaus, 1906)
- Lascoria naupalis Schaus, 1916
- Lascoria paulensis (Schaus, 1906)
- Lascoria pterophoralis (Guenée, 1854)
- Lophodelta peratostriga Hampson, 1924
- Macristis pharosalis Schaus, 1916
- Mastigophorus marima (Felder & Rogenhofer, 1874)
- Mastixis aspisalis (Walker, 1859)
- Mastixis castronalis Schaus, 1916
- Mastixis comptulalis (Guenée, 1854)
- Mastixis dukinfieldi Schaus, 1916
- Mastixis galealis (Felder & Rogenhofer, 1874)
- Mastixis staelmusalis (Walker, 1859)
- Monochroides olivescens (Warren, 1889)
- Palthis agroteralis (Guenée, 1854)
- Palthis bizialis (Walker, 1859)
- Phalaenophana fadusalis (Walker, 1859)
- Phalaenophana oppialis (Walker, 1859) (from Rio de Janeiro)
- Renia bendialis Guenée, 1854
- Renia clavalis Guenée, 1854
- Renia decurialis Guenée, 1854
- Renia endeisalis (Walker, 1859)
- Renia fimbrialis Schaus, 1916
- Renia hastatalis (Walker, [1859])
- Renia orthosialis Guenée, 1854
- Renia punctinalis Guenée, 1854
- Renia rhamphialis Guenée, 1854
- Renia rhetusalis (Walker, [1859])
- Renia testacealis Guenée, 1854
- Rejectaria carapa (Felder & Rogenhofer, 1874)
- Rejectaria erebalis Guenée, 1854
- Rejectaria niciasalis (Walker, [1859])
- Rejectaria panola Schaus, 1933
- Rejectaria parvipunctalis Schaus, 1916
- Rejectaria paulosa (Schaus, 1906)
- Rejectaria prunescens (Warren, 1889)
- Rejectaria theclalis (Walker, [1859])
- Salia bidentalis (Warren, 1889) Brazil (Amazonas)
- Salia compta (Walker, 1865) Brazil
- Salia euphrionalis (Walker, 1859) Brazil
- Salia lysippusalis (Walker, [1859]) Brazil
- Salia macarialis (Guenée, 1854) Brazil (Amazonas), Cayenne
- Salia mialis (Guenée, 1854) Cayenne, Brazil (Amazonas)
- Salia mikani (Felder & Rogenhofer, 1874) Brazil (Amazonas)
- Salia mimalis Hübner, [1818] Brazil
- Salia onesalis (Schaus, 1906) Brazil (Parana)
- Salia polycletusalis (Walker, [1859]) Brazil (Amazonas)
- Salia remulcens (Felder & Rogenhofer, 1874) Brazil (Amazonas)
- Simplicia flavipunctulata Dognin, 1914 (from Pará, São Paulo)
- Tetanolita borgesalis (Walker, 1859) (from Rio de Janeiro)

=== Hypeninae ===
- Himerarctia laeta Watson, 1975
- Hypena abscisalis Walker, [1859]
- Hypena acclinalis Walker, [1859]
- Hypena castricalis Schaus, 1904
- Hypena degesalis Walker, 1859
- Hypena dissutalis Walker, [1866]
- Hypena exoletalis Guenée, 1854
- Hypena exoticalis Guenée, 1854
- Hypena freija Schaus, 1904
- Hypena fuscipennis Warren, 1889
- Hypena gozama Schaus, 1904
- Hypena hemonalis Walker, [1859]
- Hypena illapsalis Walker, [1859]
- Hypena internalis Guenée, 1854
- Hypena lysoalis Walker, 1859
- Hypena mactatalis Walker, [1859]
- Hypena minualis Guenée, 1854
- Hypena munda Warren, 1889
- Hypena murina Walker, 1862
- Hypena pyralalis Walker, 1862
- Hypena securalis Guenée, 1854
- Hypena subidalis Guenée, 1854
- Hypena turalis Schaus, 1904
- Hypena veltalis Schaus, 1904

== Euteliidae ==
- Eutelia albilinea Barbut, 2021
- Eutelia auratrix (Walker, 1858)
- Eutelia biangulata Barbut & Lalanne-Cassou, 2005
- Eutelia jaguaria Jones, 1915(Parana)
- Eutelia maryna Schaus, 1934 (Rio de Janeiro)
- Marathyssa angustipennis (Schaus, 1906) (São Paulo)
- Paectes longiformis Pogue, 2012
- Paectes obrotunda (Guenée, 1852)
- Paectes similis Pogue, 2013
- Paectes sinuosa Pogue, 2013

=== Stictopteriinae ===
- Nagara clara (Stoll, [1782]) (Amazonas)
- Nagara fenestra (Guenée, 1852) (Rio de Janeiro)
- Nagara vitrea (Guenée, 1852) (Para)

== Lymantriinae ==
- Eloria noyesi Schaus, 1927

== Gelechiidae ==
- Alsodryas prasinoptila
- Anacampsis aedificata
- Anacampsis capyrodes
- Anacampsis diplodelta
- Anacampsis humilis
- Anacampsis idiocentra
- Anacampsis perquisita
- Anacampsis petrographa
- Anacampsis poliombra
- Anacampsis pomaceella
- Anthistarcha binocularis Meyrick, 1929 (from Bahia)
- Aristotelia argyractis Meyrick, 1923
- Aristotelia calculatrix Meyrick, 1923
- Aristotelia probolopis Meyrick, 1923
- Battaristis emissurella
- Beltheca phosphoropa (Meyrick 1922) (from Para)
- Calliprora centrocrossa Meyrick, 1922 (Amazonas)
- Calliprora clistogramma Meyrick, 1926 (São Paulo)
- Calliprora peritura Meyrick, 1922 (Para)
- Calliprora platyxipha Meyrick, 1922 (Para)
- Calliprora rhodogramma Meyrick, 1922 (Amazonas)
- Charistica caeligena (Meyrick, 1922) (from Tefé)
- Charistica exteriorella (Walker, 1864) (from Amazonas)
- Charistica ioploca (Meyrick, 1922) (from Amazonas)
- Charistica rhodopetala (Meyrick, 1922)
- Commatica cyanorrhoa Meyrick, 1914
- Compsolechia abruptella (Walker, 1864)
- Compsolechia aequilibris Meyrick, 1931
- Compsolechia amazonica Meyrick, 1918
- Compsolechia ambusta (Walsingham, 1910)
- Deltophora lanceella Sattler, 1979
- Deltophora minuta Sattler, 1979
- Dichomeris famulata Meyrick, 1914
- Gelechia bathrochlora Meyrick, 1932
- Gelechia delapsa Meyrick, 1931
- Gelechia diacmota Meyrick, 1932
- Gelechia picrogramma Meyrick, 1929 (Amazonas)
- Gelechia suspensa Meyrick, 1923 (Amazonas)
- Gelechia traducella Busck, 1914
- Helcystogramma cerinura
- Helcystogramma chalybea
- Helcystogramma chalyburga
- Helcystogramma rusticella
- Helcystogramma selectella
- Helcystogramma subvectella
- Helcystogramma thesmiopa
- Nealyda accincta Meyrick, 1923
- Nealyda leucozostra Meyrick, 1923
- Ophiolechia allomorpha Sattler, 1996
- Ophiolechia arida Sattler, 1996
- Ophiolechia contrasta Sattler, 1996
- Ophiolechia divisa Sattler, 1996
- Ophiolechia marginata Sattler, 1996
- Ophiolechia ophiomima Sattler, 1996
- Ophiolechia semiochrea Sattler, 1996
- Ophiolechia spinifera Sattler, 1996
- Ophiolechia stulta Sattler, 1996
- Ophiolechia triangula Sattler, 1996
- Percnarcha latipes (Walker, 1865)
- Percnarcha strategica Meyrick, 1930 (from Para)
- Pectinophora gossypiella
- Phthorimaea operculella (Zeller, 1873)
- Tuta absoluta (Meyrick, 1917)
- Strobisia spintheropis Meyrick, 1922 (from Amazonas)
- Sitotroga cerealella (Olivier, 1789)
- Stegasta bosqueella (Chambers, 1875)

== Geometridae ==
- Amplidasys crebraria Guenée, 1857
- Atyria dicroides Prout
- Cyclophora anaisaria
- Cyclophora angeronaria
- Cyclophora annularis
- Cyclophora antennaria
- Cyclophora argenticristata
- Cyclophora argyromyces
- Cyclophora arthura
- Cyclophora bizaria
- Cyclophora carolina
- Cyclophora castraria
- Cyclophora mossi
- Cyclophora stella
- Cyclophora zeuctospila
- Eois amaryllaria
- Eois bifilata
- Eois brasiliensis
- Eois carnana
- Eois chione
- Eois contractata
- Eois glauculata
- Eois hermosaria
- Eois hyperythraria
- Eois mictographa
- Eois neutraria
- Eois nigriplaga
- Eois olivaria
- Eois platearia
- Eois semipicta
- Eois signaria
- Eois singularia
- Eois subangulata
- Eois tegularia
- Eois telegraphica
- Eois veniliata
- Eusarca lintearia (Guenée, 1858)
- Eusarca nemora (Druce, 1892)
- Eusarca trifilaria exararia (Guenée, 1858)
- Idaea complexaria
- Idaea geminata (Warren, 1895) (from Novo Friburgo)
- Nipteria incoloraria Guenée, 1857
- Meticulodes odonaria (Oberthur)
- Neuromelia festiva (Cramer)
- Pantherodes pardalaria Hübner, 1823
- Psamatodes everiata (Guenée, 1857)
- Psamatodes pallidata (Warren, 1897)
- Psamatodes pernicata (Guenée, 1857)
- Psamatodes rimosata Guenée, 1857
- Scopula abornata (Guenée, [1858])
- Scopula apparitaria (Walker, 1861
- Scopula conotaria (Schaus, 1901)
- Scopula eburneata (Guenée, [1858])
- Scopula obliviaria (Walker, 1861)
- Scopula pallida (Warren, 1895) (from the Amazons)
- Scopula sigillata (Walker, [1863]) (from Santarem)
- Scopula vinocinctata (Guenée, [1858]
- Scopula xanthocephalata (Guenée, [1858])
- Scopula albidulata
- Scopula dismutata
- Scopula donaria
- Scopula micara
- Scopula oliveta
- Scopula recusataria
- Scopula rubrocinctata
- Scopula subquadrata
- Scopula timboensis
- Scopula unicornata

=== Larentiinae ===
- Marialma magicaria (Felder & Rogenhofer, 1875)

== Glyphypterigidae ==
- Antispastis clarkei Pastrana, 1951
- Antispastis selectella (Walker, 1863)
- Cotaena mediana Walker, 1864
- Cotaena magnifica Sohn & Heppner, 2015
- Cotaena tchalla Sohn & Heppner, 2015
- Glyphipterix atelura
- Glyphipterix hologramma
- Glyphipterix invicta
- Glyphipterix platyochra
- Glyphipterix voluptella
- Glyphipterix zalodisca
- Sagalassa valida Walker, 1856
- Ussara ancobathra Meyrick, 1932 (from Brazil)
- Ussara ancyristis Meyrick, 1920 (from Brazil)
- Ussara decoratella Walker, 1864 (from Brazil)
- Ussara olyranta Meyrick, 1931 (from Brazil)
- Ussara repletana Walker, 1864 (from Brazil)

== Gracillariidae ==
- Phylloncnistis citrella (Stainton)

== Heliodinidae ==
- Capanica lamprolitha Meyrick, 1917
- Copocentra calliscelis Meyrick, 1909

== Hepialidae ==
- Aepytus biedermanni (Viette, 1950)
- Aepytus exclamans (Herrich-Schäffer, [1854]) (from Minas Gerais)
- Aepytus guarani (Pfitzner, 1914) (from southern Brazil)
- Alloaepytus tesselloides (Schaus, 1901) (from Mato Grosso)
- Aplatissa michaelis (Pfitzner, 1914) (from Amazonas)
- Aplatissa strangoides Viette, 1953
- Cibyra dorita Schaus, 1901 (from Paraná, Santa Catarina)
- Cibyra ferruginosa Walker, 1856
- Cibyra monoargenteus (Viette, 1951) (from Paraná)
- Cibyra munona (Schaus, 1929) (from Santa Catarina)
- Cibyra oreas (Schaus, 1892) (from Rio de Janeiro)
- Cibyra schausi, Viette, (from São Paulo, Arara}
- Cibyra spitzi Viette
- Cibyra verresi (Schaus, 1929)

== Limacodidae ==
- Blazia antiqua (Dyar)
- Claphidia tersula (Druce)
- Epiperola peluda (Dognin)
- Euclea baranda Schaus
- Euglyphis punctata (Walker) (from Rio de Janeiro)
- Euprosterna elaeasa
- Isochaetes marinna (Dyar) (from Amanzonas & Goias)
- Natada debella Dyar
- Natada luscens (Walker)
- Perola jargenseni Schaus, 1921
- Perola petrapolis Dyar, 1905 (from Rio de Janeiro & Sao Paulo)
- Platyprosterna elaeetta Dyar, 1905 (from Sao Paulo & Rio de Janeiro)
- Platyprosterna pernambuconis Dyar (from Pernambuco)
- Semyra coarctata Walker, 1855
- Semyra incisa (Walker, 1855) (from Rio de Janeiro, Parana, Sao Paulo)
- Semyra terminata (Walker, 1855)
- Talima postica Walker, 1855
- Talima rufoflava (Walker, 1855)
- Tanadema incongrua Dyar, 1905
- Tanadema peruviana Hering & Hopp, 1927
- Tanadema rubra (Hering & Hopp, 1927)
- Sibine nesta

== Lyonetiidae ==
- Lyonetia iphigenia Meyrick, 1932
- Perileucoptera coffeella (Guérin-Méneville, 1842)

== Megalopygidae ==
- Megalopyge basalis (Walker, 1856) (Atlantic forest)
- Megalopyge radiata Schaus
- Microrape clenchi Becker, 2026
- Microrape melanica Becker, 2026
- Podalia annulipes (Boisduval)
- Podalia dimidiata (Herrich-Schaffer, 1856)
- Podalia walkeri
- Psychotrosia venata Becker, 2026 (from Roraima, Cacaolandia)
- Psychotrosia zernyi (Hopp, 1930) (from Amazonia)

== Momphidae / Agonoxenidae ==
- Palaeomystella henriettiphila Becker & Adamski, 2008
- Palaeomystella oligophaga Becker & Adamski (2008).
- Palaeomystella tibouchinae Becker & Adamski, 2008
- Pammeces crocoxysta Meyrick, 1922
- Prochola chloropis Meyrick, 1922
- Prochola obstructa Meyrick, 1915
- Prochola orphnopa Meyrick, 1922
- Prochola orthobasis Meyrick, 1922
- Prochola prasophanes Meyrick, 1922
- Prochola ochromicta Meyrick, 1922
- Prochola pervallata Meyrick, 1922
- Prochola semialbata Meyrick, 1922
- Prochola chalcothorax Meyrick, 1932
- Prochola subtincta (Meyrick, 1922)

== Noctuidae ==
=== Acontiinae ===
- Acontia decisa Walker, [1858]
- Acontia micropis (Druce, 1909)
- Acontia quadrata Walker, 1866
- Acontia ruffinellii (Biezanko, 1959) (Rio Grande do Sul)
- Acontia venita (Schaus, 1904)

=== Amphypirinae ===
- Callopistria floridensis (Guenée, 1852)
- Condica abida (Felder & Rogenhofer, 1874)
- Condica albigera (Guenée, 1852)
- Condica cenola (Schaus, 1906)
- Condica concisa (Walker, 1856)
- Condica cupentia (Cramer, 1780)
- Condica dentistrigata (Walker, 1865)
- Condica imitata (Druce, 1891)
- Condica inquieta (Walker, 1858)
- Condica obscura (Schaus, 1898)
- Condica parnahyba (Schaus, 1933)
- Condica selenosa (Guenée, 1852)
- Condica stelligera (Guenée, 1852)
- Condica subaurea (Guenée, 1852)
- Condica sutor (Guenée, 1852)
- Condica tetera (Walker, 1858)
- Condica vecors (Guenée, 1852)
- Elaphria agrotina (Guenée, 1852)
- Elaphria deltoides (Möschler, 1880)
- Hampsonodes bilineata (Maassen, 1890)
- Hampsonodes dislocata (Walker, [1857])
- Hampsonodes naevia (Guenée, 1852)
- Magusa orbifera (Walker, 1857)
- Spodoptera albula (Walker, 1857)
- Spodoptera androgea (Stoll, 1782)
- Spodoptera cosmioides (Walker, 1858)
- Spodoptera frugiperda (J. E. Smith, 1797)
- Spodoptera marima (Schaus, 1904)

=== Eustrotiinae ===
- Deltote astydamia (Schaus, 1894
- Deltote atrinotata (Hampson, 1910) (from Rio de Janeiro)
- Deltote benita (Schaus, 1904) (from Parana)
- Deltote chlorophila (Hampson, 1910) (from Rio de Janeiro)
- Deltote cuprea (Schaus, 1898) (from Parana)
- Deltote marmorata (Schaus, 1904) (from Sao Paulo)
- Deltote mella (Schaus, 1894) (from Rio de Janeiro)
- Deltote merta (Schaus, 1901) (from Rio de Janeiro)
- Deltote onytes (Schaus, 1894)
- Erastroides hermosilla (Schaus, 1904) (from Sao Paulo)
- Eulocastra chrysarginea (Schaus, 1906) (from Sao Paulo)
- Marimatha aurifera (Walker, [1858])
- Marimatha auruda (Schaus, 1898) (from Sao Paulo)
- Marimatha furcata (Walker, [1858])
- Marimatha rufescens (Hampson, 1910) (from Bahia)
- Marimatha botyoides (Guenée, 1852)
- Ozarba amazonia (Warren, 1889)
- Ozarba bascura Dyar, 1914
- Ozarba hoffmanni Berio, 1940 (from Santa Catarina)
- Ozarba metaleuca Hampson, 1910 (from Amazonas)
- Ozarba vicina (Schaus, 1904) (from Sao Paulo)
- Phyllophila cogela (Schaus, 1904) (from Parana)
- Tripudia balteata Smith, 1900
- Tripudia fabrilium Pogue, 2009 (from Pernambuco)
- Tripudia quadrifera (Zeller, 1874)

=== Hadeninae ===
- Chytonix elegans Schaus, 1911
- Chytonix splendens Druce
- Leucania jaliscana Schaus, 1898
- Leucania humidicola Guenée, 1852
- Pseudaletia adultera (Schaus, 1894)
- Pseudaletia sequax Franclemont, 1951
- Xanthopastis timais (Cramer, 1780)

== Plusiinae ==
- Agrapha ahenea
- Autographa gamma
- Argyrogramma verruca
- Autoplusia egena Guénée,
- Chrysodeixis includens (Walker, 1858)
- Ctenoplusia oxygramma
- Melanographa biloba
- Mouralia tinctoides
- Rachiplusia nu
- Trichoplusia ni

=== Xyleninae ===
- Elaphria subobliqua (Walker, 1858)
- Elaphria agrotina

=== Noctuinae ===
- Spodoptera frugiperda (J. E. Smith, 1797)
- Spodoptera cosmioides Walker, 1858
- Neogalea soroscula Becker,

== Nolidae ==
- Diphthera festiva (Fabricius, 1775)
- Iscadia acronyctoides (Schaus, 1915)
- Iscadia duckinfieldia Schaus, 1906 (from São Paulo)
- Iscadia montei Costa Lima, 1936 (from Minas Gerais)
- Iscadia poliopepla Hampson, 1905 (from Rio de Janeiro)
- Gyrtonides albifascia Hampson, 1912 (from Amazon)
- Gyrtonides fritzi Schaus, 1934 (from Santa Catarina)
- Lepidodes pectinata Schaus, 1904
- Lepidodes sculpta (Felder & Rogenhofer, 1874)
- Motya abseuzalis Walker, 1859
- Neostictoptera amplipennis (Hampson, 1912)
- Neostictoptera stroca (Schaus, 1906)
- Nola panthera
- Pardasena miochroa (Hampson, 1905)

== Notodontidae ==
- Americerura kalyae Becker
- Americerura minor Becker
- Arhacia combusta (Herrich-Schäffer, 1854)
- Arhacia imitata Becker, 2020
- Eustema argentata Becker, 2020 (from Roraima)
- Eustema dara (Druce,1894)
- Eustema opaca (Schaus, 1921)
- Nycterotis rhudarioides Becker, 2018 (from Brasilia, Goias)
- Rapanodonta rapana (Jones, 1908) (from Rio Grande do Sul)
- Ophitis mielkei Becker

== Oecophoridae ==
- Aulonophora brazilensis (Moore, 1883) (São Paulo)
- Capanica triphracta Meyrick, 1922
- Cerconota anonella Sepp, 1830
- Coptotelia bipunctalis (Warren)
- Ectaga garcia Becker, 1994
- Gonionota argopleura Gates, 1971
- Gonionota autocrena (Meyrick, 1930)
- Gonionota bourquini Clarke 1964
- Gonionota captans (Meyrick, 1931)
- Gonionota citronota (Meyrick, 1932)
- Gonionota charagma Gates, 1971
- Gonionota gaiophanes Gates, 1971
- Gonionota hemiglypta Gates, 1971
- Gonionota isodryas (Meyrick 1921)
- Gonionota lecithitis (Meyrick) 1912
- Gonionota praeclivis (Meyrick) 1921,
- Gonionota selene Gates, 1971
- Gonionota transversa Gates, 1971
- Inga ancorata (Walsingham, 1912)
- Inga corystes
- Inga encamina
- Inga fervida Zeller, 1855
- Inga haemataula
- Inga phaeocrossa
- Peleopoda cannescens (Clarke)
- Percnarcha strategica Meyrick, 1930
- Stenoma abductella (Walker, 1864)
- Stenoma acontiella (Walker, 1864)
- Stenoma adulans Meyrick, 1925
- Stenoma albida (Walker, 1864)
- Stenoma alligans (Butler, 1877)
- Stenoma ancillaris Meyrick, 1916
- Stenoma annosa (Butler, 1877)
- Stenoma aphrophanes Meyrick, 1929
- Stenoma aplytopis Meyrick, 1930
- Stenoma armata (Zeller, 1877)
- Stenoma auricoma Meyrick, 1930
- Stenoma bathyntis Meyrick, 1931
- Stenoma biannulata Meyrick, 1930
- Stenoma bryocosma Meyrick, 1916
- Stenoma byssina (Zeller, 1855)
- Stenoma caesarea Meyrick, 1915
- Stenoma camptospila Meyrick, 1925
- Stenoma cana (Felder & Rogenhofer, 1875)
- Stenoma catenifer Walsingham, 1912
- Stenoma cathosiota Meyrick, 1925
- Stenoma chionogramma (Meyrick, 1909)
- Stenoma chloroloba Meyrick, 1915
- Stenoma chloroxantha Meyrick, 1925
- Stenoma chromatopa Meyrick, 1930
- Stenoma codicata Meyrick, 1916
- Stenoma commutata (Meyrick, 1926) (from Manaus)
- Stenoma completella (Walker, 1864)
- Stenoma coniophaea Meyrick, 1930 (Tapertinha, Para)
- Stenoma consociella (Walker, 1864)
- Stenoma conveniens Meyrick, 1925
- Stenoma convexicostata (Zeller, 1877)
- Stenoma crypsastra Meyrick, 1915 (from Manaus)
- Stenoma curtipennis (Butler, 1877) (from Rio Purus)
- Stenoma cycnographa Meyrick, 1930 (from Taperinha, Para)
- Stenoma decora (Zeller, 1854)
- Stenoma deltomis Meyrick, 1925
- Stenoma dilinopa Meyrick, 1925
- Stenoma dissimilis Kearfott, 1911
- Stenoma dryaula Meyrick, 1925
- Stenoma dryocosma Meyrick, 1918
- Stenoma enumerata Meyrick, 1932
- Stenoma epipacta Meyrick, 1915
- Stenoma eusticta Meyrick, 1916
- Stenoma evanescens (Butler, 1877)
- Stenoma exempta Meyrick, 1925 (from Para)
- Stenoma explicita Meyrick, 1930 (from Para)
- Stenoma fallax (Butler, 1877) (Rio Negro)
- Stenoma farraria Meyrick, 1915
- Stenoma ferrocanella (Walker, 1864)
- Stenoma flavicosta (Felder & Rogenhofer, 1875)
- Stenoma fusistrigella (Walker, 1864)
- Stenoma grandaeva (Zeller, 1854)
- Stenoma gymnastis Meyrick, 1915
- Stenoma harpoceros Meyrick, 1930
- Stenoma hemiphanta Meyrick, 1925
- Stenoma hesmarcha (Meyrick, 1930) (from Taperinha, Para)
- Stenoma hopfferi (Zeller, 1854)
- Stenoma hoplitica Meyrick, 1925
- Stenoma horocharis Meyrick, 1930
- Stenoma horocyma Meyrick, 1925
- Stenoma hospitalis Meyrick, 1915 (from Rio de Janeiro)
- Stenoma hyalocryptis Meyrick, 1930
- Stenoma hypocirrha Meyrick, 1930
- Stenoma icteropis Meyrick, 1925 (from Santarém)
- Stenoma immunda (Zeller, 1854)
- Stenoma inflata (Butler, 1877)
- Stenoma invulgata Meyrick, 1915
- Stenoma irascens Meyrick, 1930
- Stenoma lapilella (Busck, 1914)
- Stenoma latitans (Dognin, 1905) (from São Paulo)
- Stenoma leptogma Meyrick, 1925
- Stenoma lucidiorella (Walker, 1864)
- Stenoma macraulax Meyrick, 1930
- Stenoma melanixa Meyrick, 1912
- Stenoma meligrapta Meyrick, 1925
- Stenoma melinopa Meyrick, 1925
- Stenoma oblita (Butler, 1877)
- Stenoma obovata Meyrick, 1931
- Stenoma ochrothicata Meyrick, 1925
- Stenoma orneopis Meyrick, 1925
- Stenoma orthographa Meyrick, 1925
- Stenoma ortholampra Meyrick, 1930
- Stenoma oxyschista Meyrick, 1925
- Stenoma pantogenes Meyrick, 1930
- Stenoma paraplecta Meyrick, 1925
- Stenoma patellifera Meyrick, 193
- Stenoma peccans (Butler, 1877)
- Stenoma peridesma Meyrick, 1925
- Stenoma picrantis Meyrick, 1930
- Stenoma perjecta Meyrick, 1931
- Stenoma picta (Zeller, 1854)
- Stenoma plagosa (Zeller, 1877)
- Stenoma procritica Meyrick, 1925 (Tefé, Amazonas)
- Stenoma promotella (Zeller, 1877) (from Santarém)
- Stenoma psalmographa Meyrick, 1931
- Stenoma pustulatella (Walker, 1864)
- Stenoma receptella (Walker, 1864)
- Stenoma relata Meyrick, 1925
- Stenoma residuella (Zeller, 1877)
- Stenoma rhothiodes Meyrick, 1915 (from São Paulo)
- Stenoma rosa (Busck, 1911)
- Stenoma salome Busck, 1911 (from São Paulo)
- Stenoma salubris Meyrick, 1925 (from Tefé, Amazonas)
- Stenoma satelles Meyrick, 1925 (from Tefé, Amazonas)
- Stenoma sciogama Meyrick, 1930 (from Bahia)
- Stenoma scitiorella (Walker, 1864)
- Stenoma scoliandra Meyrick, 1915
- Stenoma sequestra Meyrick, 1918
- Stenoma sericata (Butler, 1877)
- Stenoma sesquitertia (Zeller, 1854)
- Stenoma sommerella (Zeller, 1877)
- Stenoma spodinopis Meyrick, 1931
- Stenoma stabilis (Butler, 1877)
- Stenoma staudingerana (Maassen, 1890)
- Stenoma straminella (Walker, 1864)
- Stenoma strigivenata (Butler, 1877)
- Stenoma surinamella (Möschler, 1883)
- Stenoma syngraphopis Meyrick, 1930
- Stenoma trilineata (Butler, 1877)
- Stenoma trirecta Meyrick, 1931
- Stenoma tristrigata (Zeller, 1854)
- Stenoma ulosema Meyrick, 1930 (Rio de Janeiro)
- Stenoma umbrinervis Meyrick, 1930 (from Para)
- Stenoma uncticoma Meyrick, 1916
- Stenoma unguentata Meyrick, 1930 (from Para)
- Stenoma vaga (Butler, 1877)
- Stenoma vinifera Meyrick, 1915
- Stenoma vita (Busck, 1911)
- Stenoma vitreola Meyrick, 1925
- Stenoma xanthophaeella (Walker, 1864)
- Stenoma ybyrajubu Becker, 1971
- Stenoma zephyritis Meyrick, 1925
- Timocratica albitogata Becker, 1982
- Timocratica agramma Becker, 1982
- Timocratica anelaea (Meyrick, 1932)
- Timocratica argonais (Meyrick, 1932)
- Timocratica bicornuta Becker, 1982
- Timocratica grandis (Perty, 1833)
- Timocratica leucorectis (Meyrick, 1925)
- Timocratica major (Busck, 1909)
- Timocratica melanocosta Becker, 1982
- Timocratica melanostriga Becker, 1982
- Timocratica meridionalis Becker, 1982
- Timocratica monotonia (Strand, 1911)
- Timocratica nivea Becker, 1982
- Timocratica palpalis (Zeller, 1877)
- Timocratica parvileuca Becker, 1982
- Timocratica subovalis (Meyrick, 1932)
- Timocratica venifurcata Becker, 1982
- Tinaegeria clitarcha Meyrick, 1921
- Tinaegeria ochracea Walker, 1856 (from Para)
- Xestocasis lamprodoxa Meyrick, 1922

== Plutellidae ==
- Orthiostola crotalista Meyrick, 1928
- Orthiostola psaltria Meyrick, 1928
- Urodus amphilocha Meyrick, 1924
- Urodus symipiestis Mcvrick, 192^,

== Psychidae ==
- Animula seitzi (Gaede, 1936) (from Rio de Janeiro)
- Arrhenophanes perspicilla (Stoll, 1790) (in Alagoas, Bahia and Ceará)
- Arrhenophanes volcanica Walsingham, 1913
- Cnissostages oleaginaZeller, 1863
- Dysoptus argus Davis, 2003 (from Para)
- Dysoptus avittus Davis, 2003 (from Santa Catarina)
- Dysoptus chiquitus (Busck, 1914) (from Mato Grosso)
- Dysoptus denticulatus Davis, 2003 (from Sao Paulo)
- Dysoptus pentalobus Davis, 2003 (from Espirito Santo)
- Lumacra brasiliensis (Heylaerts, 1884)
- Lumacra künckelii (Heylaerts, 1901)
- Oiketicus geyeri Berg, 1877
- Oiketicus kirbyi Guilding, 1827 (in Alagoas, Maranhão and Pernambuco)
- Oiketicus platensis Berg, 1883
- Oiketicoides kunckeli Heylaerts, 1885

== Pyralidae ==
=== Chrysauginae ===
- Arta bichordalis Ragonot, 1891
- Arta encaustalis Ragonot, 1891
- Arta serialis Hampson, 1897
- Caphys bilineata (Stoll, [1781])
- Caphys fovealis Hampson, 1897
- Caphys pallida Hampson, 1897
- Clydonopteron sacculana (Bosc, 1800) (from Brazil, Argentina, West Indies)
- Tharsanthes synclisias Meyrick, 1936 (from Mato Grosso)

=== Epipaschiinae ===
- Anaeglis demissalis Lederer, 1863
- Carthara albicosta Walker, 1865 (in the Amazonas bassin)
- Carthara abrupta Zeller, 1881 (Amazonas)
- Cecidipta teffealis (Schaus, 1922) (from Téfe, Amazonas)
- Phidotricha erigens (Ragonot, 1888)
- Oneida antilocha Meyrick, 1936 (from Brazil, Santa Catarina)

=== Gallerinae ===
- Argyrostola ruficostalis Hampson, 1895
- Corcyra cephalonica Stainton, 1866
- Galleria mellonella (Linnaeus, 1758)
- Leptosteges pulverulenta Warren, 1889
- Xenophasma albifasciata Becker, 2022 (Central Brazil, in the Cerrado)
- Xenophasma loxogramma Becker, 2022 (from Mato Grosso to São Paulo)
- Xenophasma notodontoides Dognin, 1905 (from São Paulo)

=== Phycitinae ===
- Ancylostomia stercorea Zeller, 1848
- Apomyelois ceratoniae
- Apomyelois decolor (Zeller, 1881)
- Atheloca bondari (Heinrich 1956)
- Atheloca subrufella Hülst, 1887
- Cadra cautella (Walker, 1864)
- Cipopeoria camura J.C.Shaffer, 2003
- Cryptoblabes gnidiella (Millière, 1867)
- Coenochroa dentata Shaffer, 1989
- Coenochroa prolixa Shaffer, 1989
- Ectomyelois muriscis (Dyar, 1914)
- Ephestia kuehniella Zeller, 1879
- Ephestia elutella
- Elasmopalpus lignosellus (Zeller, 1848)
- Harnochina digitata J.C.Shaffer, 2003 (from Minas Gerais)
- Homoeographa lanceolella Ragonot
- Hypsipyla ferrealis (Hampson, 1929)
- Hypsipyla grandella (Zeller, 1848)
- Metacommotria beckeri J.C.Shaffer, 2003 (from Rondonia)
- Myelois expunctrix Dyar & Heinrich
- Neopyralis ronnai Brethes, 1920
- Plodia interpunctella (Hübner, 1827)
- Sigelgaita cerei Becker, 2003 (from Rio de Janeiro)
- Zapalla dentata J.C.Shaffer
- Zophodia goyensis Ragonot

=== Pyralinae ===
- Pyralis manihotalis Guenee, 1854

== Pterophoridae ==
- Hellinsia calais
- Hellinsia glochinias
- Hellinsia oxyntes
- Hellinsia palmatus
- Hellinsia paramoi
- Hellinsia paraochracealis
- Hellinsia stadias
- Hellinsia zetes

== Saturniidae ==
- Hylesia falcifera (Hübner, [1825])
- Hylesia gracilex Dognin, 1923(from São Paulo de Olivença, Amazonas)
- Hylesia humilis Dognin, 1923 (from São Paulo de Olivença, Amazonas)
- Hylesia metabus Cramer, 1775
- Hylesia munonia Schaus, 1927 (from São Paulo)
- Hylesia nigricans Berg, 1875
- Hylesia obtusa Dognin, 1923 (from Obidos)
- Hylesia sorana Schaus, 1927 (from São Paulo)
- Hylesia vespex Dognin, 1923
- Micrattacus friburgensis Schaus, 1915 (from Nova Friburgo)

== Sesiidae ==
- Carmenta foraseminis (Eichlin, 1995)

== Sematuridae ==
- Coronidia orithea (Cramer, [1780])

== Sphingidae ==
=== Sphinginae ===
- Adhemarius gannascus (Stoll, 1790
- Adhemarius daphne (Boisduval, 1875)
- Adhemarius roessleri Eitschberger, 2002
- Adhemarius palmeri (Boisduval, [1875])
- Adhemarius eurysthenes (C. & R. Felder, 1874)
- Adhemarius gagarini (Zikán, 1935)
- Agrius cingulata (Fabricius, 1775)
- Amphimoea walkeri (Boisduval, 1875)
- Cocytius antaeus (Drury, 1773)
- Cocytius beelzebuth (Boisduval, [1875])
- Cocytius duponchel (Poey, 1832)
- Cocytius lucifer Rothschild & Jordan, 1903
- Cocytius mephisto Haxaire & Vaglia 2002
- Cocytius mortuorum Rothschild & Jordan, 1910
- Lintneria justiciae (Walker, 1856)
- Manduca paphus (Cramer, 1779
- Manduca diffissa (Butler, 1871
- Manduca clarki (Rothschild & Jordan, 1906)
- Manduca lucetius (Cramer, 1780)
- Manduca brasiliensis (Jordan, 1911)
- Manduca janira (Jordan, 1911)
- Manduca boliviana (Clark, 1923)
- Manduca contracta (Butler, 1875)
- Manduca exiguus (Gehlen, 1942
- Manduca duquefi Haxaire & Vaglia, 2007
- Manduca tucumana (Rothschild & Jordan, 1903)
- Manduca hannibal (Cramer, 1779
- Manduca lefeburii (Guérin-Méneville, [1844])
- Manduca incisa (Walker, 1856)
- Manduca prestoni (Gehlen, 1926)
- Manduca herbini Haxaire, 2014
- Manduca brunalba (Clark, 1929)
- Manduca manducoides (Rothschild, 1894
- Manduca leucospila (Rothschild & Jordan, 1903)
- Manduca violaalba (Clark, 1922)
- Manduca rustica (Fabricius, 1775
- Manduca albiplaga (Walker, 1856)
- Manduca fosteri (Rothschild & Jordan, 1906)
- Manduca dalica (Kirby, 1877)
- Manduca gueneei (Clark, 1932)
- Manduca corumbensis (Clark, 1920)
- Manduca armatipes (Rothschild & Jordan, 1916)
- Manduca florestan (Cramer, 1782
- Manduca lichenea (Burmeister, 1855)
- Manduca vestalis (Jordan, 1917)
- Neococytius cluentius (Cramer, 1775)
- Neogene corumbensis Clark, 1922
- Neogene curitiba Jones, 1908
- Neogene dynaeus (Hübner, [1831])
- Neogene reevei (Druce, 1882)
- Protambulyx eurycles (Herrich-Schäffer, [1854])
- Protambulyx fasciatus Gehlen, 1928
- Protambulyx sulphurea Rothschild& Jordan, 1903
- Protambulyx pearsoni Haxaire & Mielke, 2019
- Protambulyx goeldii Rothschild & Jordan, 1903
- Protambulyx astygonus (Boisduval, [1875])
- Protambulyx strigilis (Linnaeus, 1771)
- Orecta lycidas (Boisduval, [1875])
- Orecta tithonus (Kirby, 1886)
- Orecta comus Haxaire & Mielke, 2013

=== Macroglossinae ===
- Aellopos ceculus (Cramer, 1777)
- Aellopos clavipes (Rothschild & Jordan, 1903)
- Aellopos tantalus (Linnaeus, 1758)
- Aellopos titan (Cramer, 1777)
- Aellopos fadus (Cramer, 1776)
- Aleuron carinata (Walker, 1856)
- Aleuron chloroptera (Perty, [1833])
- Aleuron prominens (Walker, 1856) (fig. 5)
- Aleuron iphis (Walker, 1856)
- Aleuron neglectum Rothschild & Jordan, 1903
- Aleuron ypanemae (Boisduval, [1875])
- Baniwa yavitensis Lichy, 1981
- Callionima acuta (Rothschild & Jordan, 1910)
- Callionima falcifera (Gehlen, 1943)
- Callionima grisescens (Rothschild, 1894)
- Callionima guiarti (Debauche, 1934)
- Callionima inuus (Rothschild & Jordan, 1903)
- Callionima nomius (Walker, 1856)
- Callionima parce (Fabricius, 1775)
- Callionima pan (Cramer, 1779)
- Enyo lugubris (Linnaeus, 1771
- Enyo ocypete (Linnaeus, 1758)
- Enyo gorgon (Cramer, 1777)
- Enyo cavifer (Rothschild & Jordan, 1903)
- Enyo taedium (Rothschild & Jordan, 1903)
- Erinnyis alope (Drury, 1770)
- Erinnyis crameri (Schaus, 1898)
- Erinnyis ello (Linnaeus, 1758)
- Erinnyis oenotrus (Cramer, 1782)
- Erinnyis lassauxii (Boisduval, 1859)
- Erinnyis impunctata Rothschild & Jordan, 1903
- Erinnyis obscura (Fabricius, 1775)
- Eumorpha anchemolus (Cramer, 1780)
- Eumorpha megaeacus (Cramer, 1780)
- Eumorpha obliquus (Rothschild & Jordan, 1903)
- Eumorpha orientis (Daniel, 1949)
- Eumorpha satellitia (Cramer, 1775)
- Eumorpha analis (Rothschild & Jordan, 1903)
- Eumorpha fasciatus (Sulzer, 1776)
- Eumorpha vitis (Linnaeus, 1758)
- Eumorpha translineatus (Rothschild, 1894)
- Eumorpha capronnieri (Boisduval, 1875)
- Eumorpha phorbas (Cramer, 1775)
- Eumorpha labruscae (Linnaeus, 1758)
- Eupyrrhoglossum sagra (Poey, 1832)
- Eupyrrhoglossum venustum Rothschild & Jordan, 1910
- Hemeroplanes longistriga (Rothschild & Jordan, 1903)
- Hyles euphorbiarum (Guérin-Méneville & Percheron, 1835)
- Isognathus allamandae Clark, 1920
- Isognathus australis Clark, 1917
- Isognathus brasiliensis Clark, 1919
- Isognathus caricae (Linnaeus, 1758)
- Isognathus excelsior (Boisduval, [1875])
- Isognathus leachii (Swainson, 1823)
- Isognathus menechus (Boisduval, [1875])
- Isognathus mossi Clark, 1919
- Isognathus occidentalis Clark, 1929
- Isognathus scyron (Cramer, 1780)
- Isognathus swainsonii Felder & Felder, 1862
- Hemeroplanes ornatus Rothschild, 1894
- Hemeroplanes triptolemus (Cramer, 1779)
- Madoryx bubastus (Cramer, 1777)
- Madoryx oiclus (Cramer, 1780)
- Madoryx plutonius (Hübner, [1819])
- Nyceryx alophus (Boisduval, [1875])
- Nyceryx brevis Becker, 2001
- Nyceryx coffaeae (Walker, 1856)
- Nyceryx continua (Walker, 1856)
- Nyceryx ericea (Druce, 1888)
- Nyceryx furtadoi Haxaire, 1996
- Nyceryx janzeni Haxaire, 2005
- Nyceryx lemonia Gehlen, 1941
- Nyceryx magna (C. & R. Felder, 1874)
- Nyceryx mielkei Haxaire, 2013
- Nyceryx nephus (Boisduval, [1875])
- Nyceryx nictitans (Boisduval, [1875])
- Nyceryx riscus (Schaus, 1890)
- Nyceryx stuarti (Rothschild, 1894)
- Oryba achemenides (Cramer, 1779)
- Oryba kadeni (Schaufuss, 1870)
- Pachygonidia caliginosa (Boisduval, 1870
- Pachygonidia mielkei Cadiou, 1997
- Pachygonidia martini (Gehlen, 1943)
- Pachylia ficus (Linnaeus, 1758)
- Pachylia darceta Druce, 1881
- Pachylia syces (Hübner, 1819
- Pachylioides resumens (Walker, 1856)
- Perigonia ilus Boisduval, 1870
- Perigonia leucopus Rothschild & Jordan, 1910
- Perigonia lusca (Fabricius, 1777)
- Perigonia pallida Rothschild & Jordan, 1903
- Perigonia passerina Boisduval, [1875]
- Perigonia stulta Herrich-Schäffer, [1854]
- Phanoxyla hystrix (C. & R. Felder, 1874)
- Phryxus caicus (Cramer, 1777)
- Pseudosphinx tetrio (Linnaeus, 1771)
- Unzela japix (Cramer, 1776)
- Unzela pronoe Druce, 1894
- Xylophanes aglaor (Boisduval, [1875])
- Xylophanes alineae Haxaire & C. Mielke, 2018
- Xylophanes amadis (Stoll, 1782)
- Xylophanes anubus (Cramer, 1777)
- Xylophanes chiron nechus (Cramer, 1777)
- Xylophanes crenulata Vaglia & Haxaire, 2009
- Xylophanes depuiseti (Boisduval, 1875)
- Xylophanes elara (Druce, 1878)
- Xylophanes epaphus (Boisduval, [1875])
- Xylophanes ferotinus Gehlen, 1930
- Xylophanes fosteri Rothschild & Jordan, 1906
- Xylophanes furtadoi Haxaire, 2009
- Xylophanes fusimacula (C. & R. Felder, 1874
- Xylophanes guianensis (Rothschild, 1894)
- Xylophanes haxairei Cadiou, 1985
- Xylophanes hydrata Rothschild & Jordan, 1903
- Xylophanes indistincta Closs, 1915
- Xylophanes isaon (Boisduval, [1875])
- Xylophanes lichyi Kitching & Cadiou, 2000
- Xylophanes lolita Vaglia & Haxaire, 2008
- Xylophanes loelia (Druce, 1878)
- Xylophanes marginalis Clark, 1917
- Xylophanes mielkei Haxaire, [2018]
- Xylophanes mossi Clark, 1917
- Xylophanes neoptolemus (Cramer, 1780)
- Xylophanes obscurus Rothschild & Jordan, 1910
- Xylophanes pearsoni Soares & Motta, 200
- Xylophanes pistacina (Boisduval, 1875)
- Xylophanes ploetzi (Möschler, 1876)
- Xylophanes pluto (Fabricius, 1777)
- Xylophanes porcus Rothschild & Jordan, 1903
- Xylophanes schausi (Rothschild, 1894)
- Xylophanes soaresi Haxaire & C. Mielke, 2018
- Xylophanes reussi Closs, 1920
- Xylophanes rufescens (Rothschild, 1894)
- Xylophanes tersa (Linnaeus, 1771)
- Xylophanes thyelia (Linnaeus, 1758)
- Xylophanes titana Druce, 1878
- Xylophanes tyndarus (Boisduval, 1875)
- Xylophanes undata Rothschild & Jordan, 1903
- Xylophanes xylobotes (Burmeister, 1878)

== Stathmopodidae ==
- Arauzona basalis Walker, [1865] (from Ega, Amazonas)
- Tinaegeria clitarcha Meyrick, 1921 (from Partins)
- Tinaegeria fasciata Walker, 1856 (from Para)
- Tinaegeria nephelozyga Meyrick, 1930
- Tinaegeria ochracea Walker, 1856 (from Para, Colombia)
- Tinaegeria tunicata (Meyrick, 1931)

== Tineidae ==
(incomplete list)

- Acridotarsa nasutitermina (Silvestri, 1944 (?))
- Acrolophus chloropelta Meyick, 1923 (from Tefé)
- Acrolophus chloropelta Meyrick, 1923
- Acrolophus goniocentra Meyrick, 1923
- Acrolophus emphytopa Meyrick, 1932(from Rio Grande do Sul)
- Acrolophus hypophaea Meyrick, 1923
- Acrolophus practica Meyrick, 1913
- Acrolophus pseudonoma Meyrick, 1922 (from Tefé)
- Acrolophus setiacma Meyrick, 1923 (from Manaus)
- Antipolistes anthracella Forbes, 1933
- Archinemapogon erasella (Zeller, 1863)
- Axiagasta stactogramma Meyrick, 1930
- Basanasca parcens Meyrick, 1922
- Barymochtha entherastis Meyrick, 1922 (from Manaus)
- Brithyceros dichroanthes Meyrick, 1932
- Clinograptis ogmodes Meyrick, 1932
- Colpocrita diptila Meyrick, 1930
- Compsocrita florens Meyrick, 1922
- Crepidochares subtigrina Meyrick, 1922 (from Paratins)
- Diataga brasiliensis (Zagulajev, 1966) (Rio Grande do Sul)
- Diataga leptosceles Walsingham, 1914
- Diataga frustraminis Robinson, 1986
- Dryadaula discatella (Walker, 1864)
- Episyrta protonistis Meyrick, 1930
- Harmaclona cossidella Busck, 1914
- Harmaclona tetracantha Davis, 1998
- Harmaclona triacantha Davis, 1998
- Homostinea chersadacta Meyrick, 1932 (from Obidos, Para, Brazil)
- Hybroma servulella Clemens, 1862
- Lindera baliopa Meyrick, 1917
- Lindera tessellatella Blanchard, 1852
- Lindera onychias Meyrick, 1931
- Lithopsaestis mixophanes Meyrick, 1932
- Miniscardia minimella (Busck, 1914) (Panama, French Guiana, Brazil)
- Myrmecozela retinens Meyrick, 1919
- Mythoplastis chalcochra Meyrick, 1931
- Moscardia renitens (Meyrick, 1922)
- Opogona rhynchacma Meyrick, 1920
- Opogona sacchari (Bojer, 1856)
- Pachydyta clitozona Meyrick, 1922 (from Para)
- Panthytarcha astrocharis Meyrick, 1922
- Pedaliotis dryograpta Meyrick, 1930
- Perilicmetis diplaca Meyrick, 1932
- Phereoeca uterella (Walsingham, 1897)
- Philonome penerivifera Sohn & Davis, 2015
- Philonome spectata Meyrick, 1920 (Para)
- Polypsecta halmeuta Meyrick, 1930
- Praeacedes atomosella (Walker, 1863)
- Scardia brasiliensis Zeller, 1863
- Setomorpha melichrosta (Meyrick, 1922)
- Setomorpha rutella Zeller, 1852
- Setiarcha aleuropis Meyrick, 1932
- Syncraternis anthestias Meyrick, 1922 (from Paratins)
- Syncraternis phaeospila Meyrick, 1922 (from Tefé)
- Syrrhoaula lactirivis Meyrick, 1932 (from Manaus)
- Tinea eriochrysa Meyrick, 1932 (from Obidos)
- Tinea criochrysa Meyrick
- Tinea caducella Zeller, 1877
- Tinea murariella Staudinger, 1859
- Tinea pallescentella Stainton, 1851
- Tinea subcuprea Meyrick, 1932 (from Iquitos/Peru, and Brazil)
- Tiquadra avitella Walker, 1866
- Tiquadra butyranthes Meyrick, 1931
- Tiquadra crocidura Meyrick, 1922 (from Santa Catarina)
- Tiquadra drapetica Meyrick, 1919
- Tiquadra exercitata Meyrick, 1922 (from Santa Catarina)
- Tiquadra galactura Meyrick, 1931
- Tiquadra nivosa (Felder, 1875)
- Tiquadra reversella Walker, 1866
- Tiquadra syntripta Meyrick, 1922
- Tiquadra vilis Meyrick, 1922
- Trierostola remivola Meyrick, 1932
- Xylesthia menidias Meyrick, 1922
- Xystrologa lactirivis (Meyrick, 1932) (from Manaus, Brazil)
- Xystrologa sympathetica (Meyrick, 1922) (from Manaus/Tefé)
- Zonochares tetradyas Meyrick, 1922

=== Erechthiinae ===
- Erechthias darwini Robinson, 1983
- Erechthias minuscula (Walsingham, 1897)
- Erechthias zebrina (Butler, 1881)

== Tortricidae ==
- Anacrusis atrosparsana Zeller, 1877
- Anacrusis marriana (Stoll, in Cramer, 1782) (Santa Catarina)
- Anacrusis rhizosema (Meyrick, 1931)
- Anacrusis russomitrana Razowski & Becker, 2004
- Anacrusis securiferana (Walker, 1866)
- Apotoforma epacticta Razowski & Becker, 1984 (Mato Grosso)
- Apotoforma viridans Razowski & Becker, 2003 (from Rondonia)
- Archips biforatus
- Cosmorrhyncha macrospina Brown and Razowski, 2020 (TL: Brazil)
- Cosmorrhyncha ocelliferana (Walker, 1863) (from Brazil)
- Cosmorrhyncha parintina Brown and Razowski, 2020 (TL: Brazil)
- Cosmorrhyncha tonsana (Walker)
- Ecdytolopha aurantiana (Lima, 1927)
- Epinotia aporema (Walsingham, 1914)
- Episimus caracanus Razowski & Becker
- Episimus joaquimus Razowski & Becker
- Episimus mahaiana (Felder & Rogenhofer)
- Episimus niveogriseus Razowski & Becker
- Episimus opponens Razowski & Becker
- Episimus spinuliferus Razowski & Becker
- Eulia excerptana Walker 1864
- Hilarographa quinquestrigana (Walker, 1863) (Amazonas)
- Hilarographa refluxana (Walker, 1863) (from Rio de Janeiro)
- Hilarographa mariannae Razowski, 2009
- Hilarographa xanthotoxa Meyrick, 1920 (Tefé, Amazonas)
- Hilarographa xanthotoxa Meyrick, 1920.
- Histura xanthotypa
- Histura doriae
- Orthocomotis argodonta Clarke, 1956
- Orthocomotis exolivata Clarke, 1956
- Orthocomotis leucothorax Clarke, 1956
- Orthocomotis melanochlora (Meyrick, 1931)
- Orthocomotis mareda Clarke, 1956
- Orthocomotis ochrosaphes Clarke, 1956
- Orthocomotis pseudolivata Clarke, 1956
- Orthocomotis smaragditis (Meyrick, 1912)
- Orthocomotis trissophricta (Meyrick, 1932)
- Orthocomotis twila Clarke, 1956
- Tortrix auriferana Busck, 1911
- Tortrix parana Busck, 1911

== Uraniidae ==
- Urania brasiliensis (Swainson, 1833)
- Urania leilus Linnaeus, 1758

== Yponomeutidae ==
- Aemylurgis xanthoclina Meyrick,1936 (from Para)
- Lactura quadrifrenis Meyrick, 1936 (from Para, Brazil)
- Urodus aphrogama Meyrick, 1936 (from Rio Grande do Sul, Brazil)
- Urodus pamporphyra Meyrick, 1936 (from Rio Grande do Sul, Brazil)
- Urodus procridias Meyrick, 1936 (from Rio Grande do Sul, Brazil)

== other families ==
- Abaera aurofusalis
- Abaera chalcea
- Abaera nactalis
- Acanthodica frigida
- Acanthodica penicillum
- Acarolella obnixa
- Achroosia
- Achyra brasiliensis
- Aclytia apicalis
- Aclytia conjecturalis
- Aclytia flavigutta
- Aclytia mictochroa
- Aclytia terra
- Acrolophus tapuja
- Acylita cara
- Acylita distincta
- Acylita dukinfieldi
- Acylita elongata
- Acylita monosticta
- Acylita sanguifusa
- Adoxosia excisa
- Adoxosia nydiana
- Adullamitis
- Aemilia asignata
- Aemilia pagana
- Aethes austera
- Aethes bicuspis
- Aethes evanida
- Aethes grandaeva
- Aethes jonesi
- Aethes mirifica
- Aethes planaltinae
- Aethes portentosa
- Aethesoides stellans
- Aethiophysa acutipennis
- Aethria melanobasis
- Aethria ornata
- Agaraea klagesi
- Agaraea minuta
- Agaraea nigrotuberata
- Agaraea uniformis
- Agrammia matronalis
- Agylla argentea
- Agylla barbicosta
- Agylla barbipalpia
- Agylla involuta
- Agylla marcata
- Agylla polysemata
- Agylla venosa
- Agyrta albisparsa
- Agyrta pandemia
- Agyrta porphyria
- Agyrtiola
- Aleuron prominens
- Aleuron ypanemae
- Allocryptobia
- Alsodryas deltochlora
- Amblytenes
- Ammalo violitincta
- Amorbia catarina
- Amorbia chlorolyca
- Amorbia curitiba
- Amorbia elaeopetra
- Amphonyx rivularis
- Anacrusis atrosparsana
- Anacrusis marriana
- Anacrusis rhizosema
- Anacrusis securiferana
- Anacrusis stapiana
- Anadasmus caliginea
- Anadasmus capnocrossa
- Anadasmus endochra
- Anadasmus lithogypsa
- Anaeglis
- Anarmodia damalis
- Anarmodia inflexalis
- Anarmodia majoralis
- Anarmodia sibilalis
- Antaeotricha acrograpta (Meyrick, 1915)
- Antaeotricha addon (Busck, 1911)
- Antaeotricha adjunctella (Walker, 1864)
- Antaeotricha aerinotata (Butler, 1877)
- Antaeotricha aglypta Meyrick, 1925 (Tefé)
- Antaeotricha affinis Felder & Rogenhofer, 1875
- Antaeotricha albifrons Zeller, 1877
- Antaeotricha albilimbella (Felder & Rogenhofer, 1875)
- Antaeotricha albitincta (Meyrick, 1930)
- Antaeotricha amphilyta Meyrick, 1916
- Antaeotricha amphizyga Meyrick, 1930
- Antaeotricha aratella (Walker, 1864
- Antaeotricha argocorys (Meyrick, 1931)
- Antaeotricha basiferella (Walker, 1864)
- Antaeotricha basirubrella (Walker, 1864)
- Antaeotricha bicolor (Zeller, 1839)
- Antaeotricha binubila Zeller, 1854
- Antaeotricha bipupillata Meyrick, 1930
- Antaeotricha bracatingae (Köhler, 1943)
- Antaeotricha carbasea (Meyrick, 1915) (Novo Friburgo)
- Antaeotricha cleopatra
- Antaeotricha navicularis
- Antaeotricha nephelocyma
- Antaeotricha neurographa
- Antaeotricha nitescens
- Antaeotricha nitidorella
- Antaeotricha notogramma
- Antaeotricha notosaris
- Antaeotricha ogmolopha
- Antaeotricha orgadopa
- Antaeotricha orthophaea
- Antaeotricha orthriopa
- Antaeotricha pallicosta
- Antaeotricha percnocarpa
- Antaeotricha phaselodes
- Antaeotricha planicoma
- Antaeotricha plesistia
- Antaeotricha praecisa
- Antaeotricha pyrgota
- Antaeotricha pyrobathra
- Antaeotricha refractrix
- Antaeotricha resiliens
- Antaeotricha sciospila
- Antaeotricha sellifera
- Antaeotricha semicinerea
- Antaeotricha semisignella
- Antaeotricha serarcha
- Antaeotricha sterrhomitra
- Antaeotricha stringens
- Antaeotricha stygeropa
- Antaeotricha synercta
- Antaeotricha teleosema
- Antaeotricha tetrapetra
- Antaeotricha tibialis
- Antaeotricha tornogramma
- Antaeotricha tractrix
- Antaeotricha tricapsis
- Antaeotricha tripustulella
- Antaeotricha trisinuata
- Antaeotricha tritogramma
- Antaeotricha umbriferella
- Antaeotricha unisecta
- Antaeotricha xanthopetala
- Antaeotricha xuthosaris
- Anthistarcha binocularis
- Antiblemma leucocyma
- Antona fallax
- Antona immutata
- Antona subluna
- Antona tenuifascia
- Anycles dolosus
- Aphra nyctemeroides
- Aphra trivittata
- Aphyle flavicolor
- Apilocrocis novateutonialis
- Araeomolis irregularis
- Archipimima consentanea
- Archipimima cosmoscelis
- Archipimima labyrinthopa
- Archipimima telemaco
- Archipimima vermelhana
- Archips biforatus
- Ardeutica crypsilitha
- Ardeutica emphantica
- Ardeutica semipicta
- Ardonea tenebrosa
- Areva subfulgens
- Areva trigemmis
- Argyractis argentilinealis
- Argyractis berthalis
- Argyractis flavalis
- Argyractis iasusalis
- Argyractis lophosomalis
- Argyractis obliquifascia
- Argyractis subornata
- Argyractis tapajosalis
- Argyractoides catenalis
- Argyria croceivittella
- Argyria divisella
- Argyria lucidellus
- Argyria mesogramma
- Argyria tunuistrigella
- Argyria vesta
- Argyroeides affinis
- Argyroeides braco
- Argyroeides flavicornis
- Argyroeides flavipes
- Argyroeides fuscipes
- Argyroeides magon
- Argyroeides sanguinea
- Argyroeides strigula
- Argyrotaenia albosignata
- Argyrotaenia dearmata
- Argyrotaenia fragosa
- Argyrotaenia hemixia
- Argyrotaenia iopsamma
- Argyrotaenia levidensa
- Argyrotaenia obvoluta
- Argyrotaenia sagata
- Argyrotaenia santacatarinae
- Argyrotaenia telemacana
- Argyrotaenia tristriata
- Aristotelia argyractis
- Aristotelia calculatrix
- Arogalea melitoptila
- Arouva albivitta
- Arouva mirificana
- Arsenura pandora
- Ascalenia revelata
- Asciodes scopulalis
- Ategumia actealis
- Atomopteryx doeri
- Atyphopsis roseiceps
- Aulacodes adiantealis
- Aulacodes caepiosalis
- Aulacodes chalcialis
- Aulacodes confusalis
- Aulacodes cuprescens
- Aulacodes filigeralis
- Aulacodes gothicalis
- Aulacodes halitalis
- Aulacodes ilialis
- Aulacodes moralis
- Aulacodes pampalis
- Aulacodes scaralis
- Aulacodes semicircularis
- Aulacodes templalis
- Auratonota auriginea
- Auratonota badiaurea
- Auratonota clasmata
- Auratonota exoptata
- Auratonota tessellata
- Aureopteryx calistoalis
- Autochloris completa
- Autochloris ectomelaena
- Autochloris ethela
- Autochloris laennus
- Autochloris nigridior
- Autochloris serra
- Autochloris simplex
- Autochloris solimoes
- Autochloris xanthogastroides
- Avela
- Axiagasta stactogramma
- Azamora pelopsana
- Azamora tortriciformis
- Azatrephes fuliginosa
- Azatrephes orientalis
- Azochis ectangulalis
- Azochis gripusalis
- Azochis pieralis
- Basanasca
- Blastobasis anachasta
- Bleptina caradrinalis
- Bradypophila
- Brithyceros
- Callionima guiarti
- Catadupa integrana
- Catocrocis
- Ceritaenia ceria
- Cervicrambus
- Chionodes spirodoxa
- Chromodes
- Cibyra spitzi
- Clarkeulia dubia
- Clarkeulia excerptana
- Coiffaitarctia ockendeni
- Colpocrita
- Compsocrita
- Compsolechia drachmaea
- Cratoplastis barrosi
- Crepidochares subtigrina
- Cronicombra granulata
- Cununcus phylarchus
- Cyclidalis
- Dalaca guarani
- Dalaca katharinae
- Dalaca mummia
- Dastira
- Derbeta
- Desmia extrema
- Desmia intermicalis
- Desmia jonesalis
- Desmia lacrimalis
- Desmia melanalis
- Desmia odontoplaga
- Desmia paucimaculalis
- Desmia pisusalis
- Desmia strigivitralis
- Diloxis
- Drepanodia
- Duboisvalia simulans
- Dunama ravistriata
- Dysschema tricolora
- Echeta juno
- Echeta semirosea
- Elophila fulvalis
- Elysius amapaensis
- Elysius discopunctata
- Elysius flavoabdominalis
- Elysius intensa
- Elysius intensus
- Elysius itaunensis
- Elysius jonesi
- Elysius meridionalis
- Elysius ordinaria
- Elysius pyrosticta
- Elysius systron
- Epermenia brasiliana
- Erbessa integra
- Eriostepta sanguinea
- Eucereon leucophaea
- Eucereon scyton
- Eucereon varia
- Euchromius minutus
- Eugonosia
- Eupithecia gaumaria
- Eupithecia helenaria
- Fernandocrambus diabolicus
- Fissicrambus artos
- Geropaschia
- Glaucosia
- Glaucostola guttipalpis
- Goya simulata
- Haemaphlebiella formona
- Hapalonoma sublustricella

'

- Heterauge
- Homura nocturnalis
- Hypidota
- Idneodes
- Imara satrapes
- Imma chloromelalis
- Imma eriospila
- Imma metachlora
- Imma quadrivittana
- Imma thymora
- Itambe fenestalis
- Jocara cristalis
- Lamprosema canacealis
- Lamprosema distentalis
- Lamprosema semicostalis
- Lineodes fontella
- Lithopsaestis
- Loxotoma seminigrens
- Manduca diffissa
- Marisba
- Mellamastus
- Melora amygdaloides
- Mesopediasia hemixanthellus
- Mesopediasia psyche
- Metallocrates
- Microzancla
- Moca albodiscata
- Moca nipharcha
- Moca niphostoma
- Moca pelomacta
- Moca roscida
- Moca vexatalis
- Molopostola calumnias
- Monachozela neoleuca
- Neoculladia incanellus
- Neotheora
- Oectoperodes
- Oncolabis
- Opharus intermedia
- Opharus nigrocinctus
- Opharus notata
- Opharus rema
- Ophias
- Oryctopleura
- Oxyelophila lanceolalis
- Parapediasia atalanta
- Parapediasia cervinellus
- Parapediasia murinellus
- Parapediasia paranella
- Patania silicalis
- Pedaliotis
- Petrophila aengusalis
- Petrophila constellalis
- Phanerozela polydora
- Phostria albirenalis
- Phostria delilalis
- Phostria euagra
- Phostria persiusalis
- Phostria phryganurus
- Phostria samealis
- Phostria varialis
- Polygrammodes compositalis
- Polygrammodes dubialis
- Polygrammodes eaclealis
- Polygrammodes farinalis
- Polygrammodes herminealis
- Polygrammodes klagesi
- Polygrammodes leucalis
- Polygrammodes maccalis
- Polygrammodes nervosa
- Polygrammodes obscuridiscalis
- Polygrammodes obsoletalis
- Polygrammodes ostrealis
- Polygrammodes ponderalis
- Polygrammodes runicalis
- Polygrammodes semirufa
- Polygrammodes supremalis
- Polypsecta
- Pseudohemihyalea klagesi
- Pseudosphex spitzi
- Pycnarmon deicoonalis
- Pycnarmon juanalis
- Pycnarmon mallaleuca
- Anania ademonalis
- Anania arenacea
- Anania cervinalis
- Anania desistalis
- Recurvaria insequens
- Recurvaria intermissella
- Recurvaria penetrans
- Recurvaria pleurosaris
- Recurvaria saxea
- Rhodographa
- Scirpophaga terrella
- Setiarcha
- Spinivalva
- Spinulata discopuncta
- Stilbosis argyritis
- Tortriculladia argentimaculalis
- Tortriculladia pentaspila
- Trichophassus
- Triclonella aglaogramma
- Triclonella albicellata
- Triclonella calyptrodes
- Triclonella chionozona
- Triclonella citrocarpa
- Triclonella cruciformis
- Triclonella diglypta
- Triclonella trachyxyla
- Tricypha obscura
- Tricypha ochrea
- Trierostola
- Zatrephes miniata
- Zonochares
