= Antaeotricha refractrix =

Scientific classification
- Domain: Eukaryota
- Kingdom: Animalia
- Phylum: Arthropoda
- Class: Insecta
- Order: Lepidoptera
- Family: Depressariidae
- Genus: Antaeotricha
- Species: A. refractrix

Binomial name
- Antaeotricha refractrix Meyrick, 1930

Species of moth

Antaeotricha refractrix is a moth in the family Depressariidae. It was described by Edward Meyrick in 1930, in Brazil.
