= Antaeotricha pyrobathra =

Scientific classification
- Kingdom: Animalia
- Phylum: Arthropoda
- Clade: Pancrustacea
- Class: Insecta
- Order: Lepidoptera
- Family: Depressariidae
- Genus: Antaeotricha
- Species: A. pyrobathra

Binomial name
- Antaeotricha pyrobathra (Meyrick, 1931)

Synonyms
- Stenoma pyrobathra Meyrick, 1931

Species of moth

Antaeotricha pyrobathra is a moth in the family Depressariidae. It was described by Edward Meyrick in 1931. It is found in Brazil.
