= Stenoma oxyschista =

Scientific classification
- Kingdom: Animalia
- Phylum: Arthropoda
- Clade: Pancrustacea
- Class: Insecta
- Order: Lepidoptera
- Family: Depressariidae
- Genus: Stenoma
- Species: S. oxyschista

Binomial name
- Stenoma oxyschista Meyrick, 1925

Species of moth

Stenoma oxyschista is a moth in the family Depressariidae. It is found in Amazonas in northwestern Brazil.

== Description ==
Stenoma oxyschista possesses a wingspan of 41–67 mm (2–3 in). The forewings are dark grey, while the costal third and apical area beyond the third line are white. There are three very strong, dark fuscous lines from the costa to the disc, with the third being curved around beneath the tornus. Beneath the lines, the disc is variably streaked lengthwise with white and dark fuscous, including a fuscous plical streak on the basal third, and a median streak on the central third. There are two or three distinct black marginal dots or marks above the apex, and one or two minute dots below. The hindwings are dark grey.
