= Antaeotricha xanthopetala =

Scientific classification
- Kingdom: Animalia
- Phylum: Arthropoda
- Class: Insecta
- Order: Lepidoptera
- Family: Depressariidae
- Genus: Antaeotricha
- Species: A. xanthopetala

Binomial name
- Antaeotricha xanthopetala (Meyrick, 1931)

Synonyms
- Stenoma xanthopetala Meyrick, 1931

Species of moth

Antaeotricha xanthopetala is a moth in the family Depressariidae. It was described by Edward Meyrick in 1931. It is found in Brazil.

The wingspan is about 26 mm. The forewings and hindwings are white. The undersurface of the wings is also wholly white.
