= Scopula obliviaria =

Scientific classification
- Kingdom: Animalia
- Phylum: Arthropoda
- Class: Insecta
- Order: Lepidoptera
- Family: Geometridae
- Genus: Scopula
- Species: S. obliviaria

Binomial name
- Scopula obliviaria (Walker, 1861)

Synonyms
- Acidalia obliviaria Walker, 1861; Craspedia chlorochrea Warren, 1900

Species of geometer moth in subfamily Sterrhinae

Scopula obliviaria is a moth of the family Geometridae. It is found in Brazil.
