= Scopula vinocinctata =

Scientific classification
- Kingdom: Animalia
- Phylum: Arthropoda
- Class: Insecta
- Order: Lepidoptera
- Family: Geometridae
- Genus: Scopula
- Species: S. vinocinctata

Binomial name
- Scopula vinocinctata (Guenée, [1858])

Synonyms
- Acidalia vinocinctata Guenée, 1858

Species of geometer moth in subfamily Sterrhinae

Scopula vinocinctata is a moth of the family Geometridae. It is found in Brazil.
