= Stenoma scitiorella =

Scientific classification
- Kingdom: Animalia
- Phylum: Arthropoda
- Class: Insecta
- Order: Lepidoptera
- Family: Depressariidae
- Genus: Stenoma
- Species: S. scitiorella

Binomial name
- Stenoma scitiorella (Walker, 1864)

Synonyms
- Cryptolechia scitiorella Walker, 1864; Cryptolechia laeviuscula Zeller, 1877; Stenoma felix Busck, 1914; Stenoma argotoma Meyrick, 1915

Species of insect

Stenoma scitiorella is a moth in the family Depressariidae. It was described by Francis Walker in 1864. It is found in Panama, Brazil (Amazonas) and Guyana.

The wingspan is 12–13 mm. The forewings are glossy violet grey with the costa more or less broadly suffused with white from the base to the middle and with a rather oblique hardly curved somewhat irregular white line from the middle of the costa to two-thirds of the dorsum, rather suffused anteriorly, edged with dark fuscous posteriorly. The wing beyond this is glossy dark slaty grey, with the costal edge and a streak around the termen white. There are some marginal dark fuscous dots around the apex and termen. The hindwings are grey.
