= Stenoma invulgata =

Scientific classification
- Domain: Eukaryota
- Kingdom: Animalia
- Phylum: Arthropoda
- Class: Insecta
- Order: Lepidoptera
- Family: Depressariidae
- Genus: Stenoma
- Species: S. invulgata

Binomial name
- Stenoma invulgata Meyrick, 1915

Species of moth

Stenoma invulgata is a moth of the family Depressariidae. It is found in Venezuela.

The wingspan is 22–23 mm. The forewings are greyish ochreous with the extreme costal edge whitish ochreous. The stigmata are dark fuscous, the plical obliquely beyond the first discal. There is a series of cloudy dark fuscous dots from the costa at three-fourths to the dorsum at four-fifths, sinuate beneath the costa, strongly and abruptly curved outwards in the disc. There is a series of marginal dark fuscous dots around the apex and termen. The hindwings are grey.
