= Pachydyta =

Scientific classification
- Kingdom: Animalia
- Phylum: Arthropoda
- Clade: Pancrustacea
- Class: Insecta
- Order: Lepidoptera
- Family: Tineidae
- Genus: Pachydyta; Meyrick, 1922
- Species: P. clitozona

Binomial name
- Pachydyta clitozona Meyrick, 1922

Genus of moths

Pachydyta is a genus of moths belonging to the family Tineidae. It contains only one species, Pachydyta clitozona, which is found in Brazil and French Guiana.
