= Archips biforatus =

Scientific classification
- Kingdom: Animalia
- Phylum: Arthropoda
- Clade: Pancrustacea
- Class: Insecta
- Order: Lepidoptera
- Family: Tortricidae
- Genus: Archips
- Species: A. biforatus

Binomial name
- Archips biforatus (Meyrick, 1930)

Synonyms
- Cacoecia biforata Meyrick, 1930; Archips biforata

Species of moth

Archips biforatus is a species of moth of the family Tortricidae. It is found in Brazil.
