= Scopula dismutata =

Scientific classification
- Domain: Eukaryota
- Kingdom: Animalia
- Phylum: Arthropoda
- Class: Insecta
- Order: Lepidoptera
- Family: Geometridae
- Genus: Scopula
- Species: S. dismutata

Binomial name
- Scopula dismutata (Guenée, [1858])

Synonyms
- Acidalia dismutata Guenée, 1858; Achlora catenularia Walker, 1861

Species of geometer moth in subfamily Sterrhinae

Scopula dismutata is a moth of the family Geometridae. It is endemic to Brazil.
