= Stenoma vita =

Scientific classification
- Domain: Eukaryota
- Kingdom: Animalia
- Phylum: Arthropoda
- Class: Insecta
- Order: Lepidoptera
- Family: Depressariidae
- Genus: Stenoma
- Species: S. vita

Binomial name
- Stenoma vita (Busck, 1911)

Synonyms
- Gonioterma vita Busck, 1911

Species of moth

Stenoma vita is a moth in the family Depressariidae. It was described by August Busck in 1911. It is found in Brazil and the Guianas.

The wingspan is 24–25 mm. The forewings are light straw yellow, with a large brown shade resting on the dorsal edge and covering most of the wing. The brown shades gradually into the yellow and leaves the base, costal, and terminal edge pure yellow. On the costal edge are two very small dark brown dots, one on the middle and one at apical sixth. The hindwings are light straw yellow.
