= Stenoma hemiphanta =

Scientific classification
- Domain: Eukaryota
- Kingdom: Animalia
- Phylum: Arthropoda
- Class: Insecta
- Order: Lepidoptera
- Family: Depressariidae
- Genus: Stenoma
- Species: S. hemiphanta

Binomial name
- Stenoma hemiphanta Meyrick, 1925

Species of moth

Stenoma hemiphanta is a moth of the family Depressariidae. It is found in Amazonas, Brazil.

The wingspan is 24–26 mm. The forewings are pale brownish ochreous, the costal edge whitish and with a dark fuscous dot on the base of the costa. There are three dark fuscous spots on the costa, the first at one-fourth, small or nearly obsolete, the second largest, semi-oval, beyond the middle, the third somewhat smaller, semicircular, at four-fifths. The stigmata are very small, dark grey, the plical slightly beyond the first discal, the second discal transversely double. There is a rather curved series of small faint grey dots from the third costal spot to the tornus. There is a terminal series of dark fuscous dots. The hindwings are light ochreous orange with the dorsal half grey.
