= Stenoma rhothiodes =

Scientific classification
- Domain: Eukaryota
- Kingdom: Animalia
- Phylum: Arthropoda
- Class: Insecta
- Order: Lepidoptera
- Family: Depressariidae
- Genus: Stenoma
- Species: S. rhothiodes

Binomial name
- Stenoma rhothiodes Meyrick, 1915

Species of moth

Stenoma rhothiodes is a moth of the family Depressariidae. It is found in São Paulo, Brazil.

The wingspan is about 17 mm. The forewings are white with a subtriangular fuscous patch extending on the dorsum from one-fourth to beyond the middle and reaching half across the wing, anteriorly spotted and sprinkled with black. There is an oblique fuscous strigula from the costa at one-fourth and an oblique fuscous spot on the middle of the costa, connected with an area of fuscous irroration and suffusion occupying the posterior half of the wing except along the costa and a spot on the tornus. The discal stigmata are small and dark fuscous and there are nine large blackish marginal dots around the posterior fourth of the costa and termen. The hindwings are pale whitish grey, more whitish towards the base.
