= Stenoma immunda =

Scientific classification
- Kingdom: Animalia
- Phylum: Arthropoda
- Clade: Pancrustacea
- Class: Insecta
- Order: Lepidoptera
- Family: Depressariidae
- Genus: Stenoma
- Species: S. immunda

Binomial name
- Stenoma immunda (Zeller, 1854)

Synonyms
- Cryptolechia immunda Zeller, 1854; Cryptolechia tectella Walker, 1864; Stenoma perophora Meyrick, 1915

Species of moth

Stenoma immunda is a moth of the family Depressariidae. It is found in Guatemala, Panama, Venezuela, Ecuador, Peru, Brazil (Rio de Janeiro, Santa Catarina), the Guianas and Trinidad.

The wingspan is about 36 mm. The forewings are whitish fuscous with the plical and second discal stigmata small and dark fuscous, the plical touching the edge of the costal fold. There is a faint strongly and irregularly curved interrupted fuscous shade from the middle of the costa to three-fifths of the dorsum and a curved series of cloudy fuscous dots from beneath the costa at four-fifths to near the tornus, sinuate inwards towards the costa. There is also a terminal series of dark fuscous dots, and two fuscous dots on the costa near the apex. The hindwings are grey, the apex suffused with pale ochreous.
