= Stenoma strigivenata =

Scientific classification
- Domain: Eukaryota
- Kingdom: Animalia
- Phylum: Arthropoda
- Class: Insecta
- Order: Lepidoptera
- Family: Depressariidae
- Genus: Stenoma
- Species: S. strigivenata

Binomial name
- Stenoma strigivenata (Butler, 1877)

Synonyms
- Cryptolechia strigivenata Butler, 1877; Cryptolechia urbana Butler, 1877; Stenoma entephras Meyrick, 1915; Stenoma porinodes Meyrick, 1915; Stenoma clarkei Amsel, 1956

Species of moth

Stenoma strigivenata is a moth of the family Depressariidae. It is found in the Amazon region, Guyana and Peru.

The wingspan is 21–27 mm for males and about 24 mm for females. The forewings are ashy grey or whitish grey with the extreme coastal edge whitish. The plical and second discal stigmata are darker and obscure and there is a cloudy darker grey curved line from three-fourths of the costa to the tornus, indented above the middle. A series of minute dark grey marginal dots is found around the apex and termen. The hindwings are grey or light grey, somewhat darker posteriorly.
