= Stenoma procritica =

Scientific classification
- Domain: Eukaryota
- Kingdom: Animalia
- Phylum: Arthropoda
- Class: Insecta
- Order: Lepidoptera
- Family: Depressariidae
- Genus: Stenoma
- Species: S. procritica

Binomial name
- Stenoma procritica Meyrick, 1925

Species of moth

Stenoma procritica is a moth of the family Depressariidae. It is found in Brazil (Amazonas) and Peru.

The wingspan is 22–29 mm. The forewings are white, variably suffused pale brownish, which forms slender costal and dorsal streaks and moderately broad undefined longitudinal streaks above and below the middle throughout, these cut by pale or white lines on the veins and more or less mixed blackish fuscous between them. The stigmata are black, the plical obliquely beyond the first discal, a fine blackish line along the fold from the base to this. There is a curved subterminal series of cloudy dots of fuscous or dark fuscous irroration and a marginal series of black dots around the apex and termen. The hindwings are pale greyish, whitish tinged towards the base, the apical edge suffused dark grey.
