= Stenoma commutata =

Scientific classification
- Kingdom: Animalia
- Phylum: Arthropoda
- Class: Insecta
- Order: Lepidoptera
- Family: Depressariidae
- Genus: Stenoma
- Species: S. commutata

Binomial name
- Stenoma commutata (Meyrick, 1926)

Synonyms
- Eumiturga commutata Meyrick, 1926

Species of moth

Stenoma commutata is a moth of the family Depressariidae. It is found in Brazil.

The wingspan is 15–17 mm. The forewings are white with a dark brown dot on the base of the fold, and a brown dot near the base above it. There is more or less brown suffusion towards the base of the dorsum. The second discal stigma is dark fuscous and there is a dark fuscous mark on the costa at one-third, where an irregular brownish line with expansions or angles indicating the first discal and plical stigmata runs to a blotch of suffusion on the dorsum before the middle. There is a triangular, dark fuscous spot on the costa beyond the middle, where an indistinct brownish interrupted or partially obsolete line runs beyond the second discal stigma to the dorsum at four-fifths and a larger triangular dark fuscous spot is found on the costa at four-fifths, where a curved brownish line runs to the tornus. There is also a marginal series of blackish dots around the apex and termen. The hindwings are grey whitish.
