= Antaeotricha amphilyta =

Scientific classification
- Kingdom: Animalia
- Phylum: Arthropoda
- Clade: Pancrustacea
- Class: Insecta
- Order: Lepidoptera
- Family: Depressariidae
- Genus: Antaeotricha
- Species: A. amphilyta

Binomial name
- Antaeotricha amphilyta Meyrick, 1916

Species of moth in genus Antaeotricha

Antaeotricha amphilyta is a moth of the family Depressariidae. It is found in the Guianas and Brazil.

The wingspan is 17–18 mm. The forewings are white with dark fuscous markings. There is a short basal transverse mark from the costa and an oblique dash above the base of the dorsum, connected with a narrow fuscous streak along the basal half of the dorsum, as well as a short dash towards the base in the middle. There is an irregular line from one-fifth of the costa to the middle of the dorsum reduced to a short costal and larger dorsal segment, with a short dash in the middle between them. Two slightly sinuate oblique lines are found from the costa at the middle and three-fourths, on the dorsal half limiting a quadrate fuscous pre-tornal blotch and there are seven or eight black marginal dots around the apex and termen, sometimes partially connected. The hindwings are pale grey, towards the base whitish-tinged, the apex whitish and marked with dark fuscous on the margin. The costa is slightly expanded from the base to two-thirds, with a strong projection of long rough hairscales before the middle suffused with dark grey beneath, and a long whitish subcostal hairpencil from the base lying beneath the forewings.
