= Stenoma annosa =

Scientific classification
- Domain: Eukaryota
- Kingdom: Animalia
- Phylum: Arthropoda
- Class: Insecta
- Order: Lepidoptera
- Family: Depressariidae
- Genus: Stenoma
- Species: S. annosa

Binomial name
- Stenoma annosa (Butler, 1877)

Synonyms
- Cryptolechia annosa Butler, 1877; Stenoma cirrhogramma Meyrick, 1930; Stenoma sublunaris Meyrick, 1930; Stenoma agathelpis Meyrick, 1932

Species of moth

Stenoma annosa is a moth in the family Depressariidae. It was described by Arthur Gardiner Butler in 1877. It is found in the Brazilian states of Pará and Amazonas.
