= Stenoma acontiella =

Scientific classification
- Domain: Eukaryota
- Kingdom: Animalia
- Phylum: Arthropoda
- Class: Insecta
- Order: Lepidoptera
- Family: Depressariidae
- Genus: Stenoma
- Species: S. acontiella

Binomial name
- Stenoma acontiella (Walker, 1864)

Synonyms
- Cryptolechia acontiella Walker, 1864

Species of moth

Stenoma acontiella is a moth of the family Depressariidae. It is found in Amazonas, Brazil.

Adults are cupreous, with moderately broad wings. The forewings are silvery white, nearly rectangular at the tips and with an elongate cupreous patch extending from the base along half the length of the interior border, occupying most of the breadth, connected by three cupreous points with a large short-elliptical cupreous spot, which extends nearly to the exterior border. The marginal points are cupreous. The hindwings have a cinereous fringe.
