= Antaeotricha orgadopa =

Scientific classification
- Domain: Eukaryota
- Kingdom: Animalia
- Phylum: Arthropoda
- Class: Insecta
- Order: Lepidoptera
- Family: Depressariidae
- Genus: Antaeotricha
- Species: A. orgadopa

Binomial name
- Antaeotricha orgadopa (Meyrick, 1925)

Synonyms
- Stenoma orgadopa Meyrick, 1925

Species of moth

Antaeotricha orgadopa is a moth of the family Depressariidae. It is found in Pará, Brazil.

The wingspan is about 13 mm. The forewings are dark grey with the costal edge white from near the base to the cilia, with a slight thickening beyond the middle. There are three indistinct nearly straight oblique parallel blackish lines crossing the wing from the costa at about one-fourth, the middle, and three-fourths, the third shortly produced inwards on the costa, the lower end slightly recurved to the tornus. There is a marginal row of white dots around the apex and termen alternating with blackish dots. The hindwings are blackish-grey.
