= Stenoma salubris =

Scientific classification
- Domain: Eukaryota
- Kingdom: Animalia
- Phylum: Arthropoda
- Class: Insecta
- Order: Lepidoptera
- Family: Depressariidae
- Genus: Stenoma
- Species: S. salubris

Binomial name
- Stenoma salubris Meyrick, 1925

Species of moth

Stenoma salubris is a moth of the family Depressariidae. It is found in Amazonas, Brazil.

The wingspan is 13–14 mm. The forewings are grey whitish with a blackish dot on the base of the fold. The stigmata are rather large, blackish, the plical obliquely beyond the first discal. There is some slight fuscous suffusion towards the base of the dorsum and a cloudy dark fuscous shade connecting the plical stigma with the dorsum. A suffused dark fuscous shade is found from the costa at three-fifths, somewhat angulated beyond the second discal stigma to the dorsum near the tornus. There is a curved dark fuscous line from the costa at four-fifths to the tornus, indented towards the costa. A marginal series of blackish dots is found around the apex and termen. The hindwings are pale grey.
