= Tortriculladia argentimaculalis =

Scientific classification
- Kingdom: Animalia
- Phylum: Arthropoda
- Class: Insecta
- Order: Lepidoptera
- Family: Crambidae
- Subfamily: Crambinae
- Tribe: Crambini
- Genus: Tortriculladia
- Species: T. argentimaculalis

Binomial name
- Tortriculladia argentimaculalis (Hampson, 1919)

Synonyms
- Crambus argentimaculalis Hampson, 1919; Culladia argentimaculatis Błeszyński & Collins, 1962

Species of moth

Tortriculladia argentimaculalis is a moth in the family Crambidae. It was described by George Hampson in 1919. It is found in Brazil.
