= Pedaliotis =

Scientific classification
- Kingdom: Animalia
- Phylum: Arthropoda
- Clade: Pancrustacea
- Class: Insecta
- Order: Lepidoptera
- Family: Tineidae
- Genus: Pedaliotis; Meyrick, 1930
- Species: P. dryograpta

Binomial name
- Pedaliotis dryograpta Meyrick, 1930

Genus of moths

Pedaliotis is a genus of moths belonging to the family Tineidae. It contains only one species, Pedaliotis dryograpta, which is found in Brazil.
