= Stenoma farraria =

Scientific classification
- Kingdom: Animalia
- Phylum: Arthropoda
- Class: Insecta
- Order: Lepidoptera
- Family: Depressariidae
- Genus: Stenoma
- Species: S. farraria

Binomial name
- Stenoma farraria Meyrick, 1915

Species of moth

Stenoma farraria is a moth of the family Depressariidae. It is found in Guyana.

The wingspan is about 18 mm. The forewings are brownish, slightly and obscurely whitish sprinkled. The plical and second discal stigmata are darker brown and there are three faint irregular darker transverse lines, the first hardly traceable, the second from three-fifths of the costa to four-fifths of the dorsum, the third from four-fifths of the costa to the tornus, somewhat curved. There is a marginal series of dark fuscous dots around the apex and termen. The hindwings are dark grey.
