= Anacrusis securiferana =

Scientific classification
- Kingdom: Animalia
- Phylum: Arthropoda
- Class: Insecta
- Order: Lepidoptera
- Family: Tortricidae
- Genus: Anacrusis
- Species: A. securiferana

Binomial name
- Anacrusis securiferana (Walker, 1866)

Synonyms
- Pandemis securiferana Walker, 1866; Anacrusis iheringi Kearfott, 1911

Species of moth

Anacrusis securiferana is a species of moth of the family Tortricidae. It is found in Brazil in the states of Paraná, Santa Catarina and São Paulo.
