= Stenoma lapilella =

Scientific classification
- Kingdom: Animalia
- Phylum: Arthropoda
- Class: Insecta
- Order: Lepidoptera
- Family: Depressariidae
- Genus: Stenoma
- Species: S. lapilella

Binomial name
- Stenoma lapilella (Busck, 1914)

Synonyms
- Catarata lapilella Busck, 1914; Stenoma involucralis Meyrick, 1931

Species of moth

Stenoma lapilella is a moth in the family Depressariidae. It was described by August Busck in 1914. It is found in Panama and Brazil.
