= Stenoma rosa =

Scientific classification
- Domain: Eukaryota
- Kingdom: Animalia
- Phylum: Arthropoda
- Class: Insecta
- Order: Lepidoptera
- Family: Depressariidae
- Genus: Stenoma
- Species: S. rosa

Binomial name
- Stenoma rosa (Busck, 1911)

Synonyms
- Gonioterma rosa Busck, 1911

Species of moth

Stenoma rosa is a moth in the family Depressariidae. It was described by August Busck in 1911. It is found in Brazil and the Guianas.

The wingspan is about 23 mm. The forewings are light rosy ocherous with two conspicuous dark brown costal spots, one just beyond the middle of the wing and one at apical fifth. From the basal third of the costa runs a thin light brown straight line obliquely across the wing to the middle of the dorsum and on the end of the cell is a very faint, transverse line of dark brown scales. Along the terminal edge is a series of short black marginal streaks. The hindwings are light reddish yellow.
