= Stenoma plagosa =

Scientific classification
- Kingdom: Animalia
- Phylum: Arthropoda
- Clade: Pancrustacea
- Class: Insecta
- Order: Lepidoptera
- Family: Depressariidae
- Genus: Stenoma
- Species: S. plagosa

Binomial name
- Stenoma plagosa (Zeller, 1877)

Synonyms
- Antaeotricha plagosa Zeller, 1877

Species of moth

Stenoma plagosa is a moth in the family Depressariidae. It was described by Philipp Christoph Zeller in 1877. It is found in Brazil.
