= Stenoma curtipennis =

Scientific classification
- Domain: Eukaryota
- Kingdom: Animalia
- Phylum: Arthropoda
- Class: Insecta
- Order: Lepidoptera
- Family: Depressariidae
- Genus: Stenoma
- Species: S. curtipennis

Binomial name
- Stenoma curtipennis (Butler, 1877)

Synonyms
- Cryptolechia curtipennis Butler, 1877

Species of moth

Stenoma curtipennis is a moth in the family Depressariidae. It was described by Arthur Gardiner Butler in 1877. It is found in the Amazon region of Brazil.

The wingspan is about 22 mm. The wings are pale brown, especially the forewings which are shining and have a pinky gloss. The inner margin and a dot at the end of the cell are black and there is an oblique line crossing the cell from the costa, and two crossing the upper half of the disc, convergent and uniting near the middle of the outer margin, smoky brown.
