= Scopula abornata =

Scientific classification
- Domain: Eukaryota
- Kingdom: Animalia
- Phylum: Arthropoda
- Class: Insecta
- Order: Lepidoptera
- Family: Geometridae
- Genus: Scopula
- Species: S. abornata

Binomial name
- Scopula abornata (Guenée, [1858])

Synonyms
- Acidalia abornata Guenée, 1858

Species of geometer moths in subfamily Sterrhinae

Scopula abornata is a moth of the family Geometridae. It was described by Achille Guenée in 1858. It is endemic to Brazil.
