= Polygrammodes semirufa =

Scientific classification
- Kingdom: Animalia
- Phylum: Arthropoda
- Class: Insecta
- Order: Lepidoptera
- Family: Crambidae
- Genus: Polygrammodes
- Species: P. semirufa

Binomial name
- Polygrammodes semirufa Hampson, 1913

Synonyms
- Polygrammodes basaralis Schaus, 1920

Species of moth

Polygrammodes semirufa is a moth in the family Crambidae. It was described by George Hampson in 1913. It is found in São Paulo, Brazil.

The wingspan is about 46 mm. The forewings are deep rufous on the costal area to beyond the middle and on the inner area to the middle. The rest of the wing is yellow and there is a faint brown antemedial line. The postmedial line is waved and brownish, with white spots before it on the rufous area in the discal fold and below the end of the cell and yellow spots between veins 5 and 2. The subterminal line is formed by a series of brown lunules and there is a series of slight brown marks just before the termen. The hindwings are yellow, the inner area slightly tinged with rufous. There is a rufous discoidal spot and the postmedial ine is rufous, arising below the costa, produced to three teeth enclosing small yellow spots between veins 5 and 2. There is an indistinct lunulate subterminal line and there are slight brownish spots just before the termen towards the apex and tornus.
