= Antaeotricha basiferella =

Scientific classification
- Kingdom: Animalia
- Phylum: Arthropoda
- Clade: Pancrustacea
- Class: Insecta
- Order: Lepidoptera
- Family: Depressariidae
- Genus: Antaeotricha
- Species: A. basiferella

Binomial name
- Antaeotricha basiferella (Walker, 1864)

Synonyms
- Cryptolechia basiferella Walker, 1864

Species of moth in genus Antaeotricha

Antaeotricha basiferella is a moth in the family Depressariidae. It was described by Francis Walker in 1864. It is found in Amazonas, Brazil.

Adults are brownish cinereous (ash gray), the forewings with a brown oblique basal streak, and with a brown discal point at two-thirds of the length.
