= Stenoma hoplitica =

Scientific classification
- Domain: Eukaryota
- Kingdom: Animalia
- Phylum: Arthropoda
- Class: Insecta
- Order: Lepidoptera
- Family: Depressariidae
- Genus: Stenoma
- Species: S. hoplitica

Binomial name
- Stenoma hoplitica Meyrick, 1925

Species of moth

Stenoma hoplitica is a moth of the family Depressariidae. It is found in Amazonas, Brazil.

The wingspan is 16–17 mm. The forewings are light pinkish violet with the costal edge ochreous yellow to near the apex. The plical stigma is obscurely grey, followed by some whitish scales, the second discal transverse, dark grey. There is a suffused pale grey terminal patch, its edge rather convex, running from the apex to the dorsum about two-thirds, traversed by a grey sinuate subterminal shade. The hindwings are grey.
