= Stenoma ancillaris =

Scientific classification
- Domain: Eukaryota
- Kingdom: Animalia
- Phylum: Arthropoda
- Class: Insecta
- Order: Lepidoptera
- Family: Depressariidae
- Genus: Stenoma
- Species: S. ancillaris

Binomial name
- Stenoma ancillaris Meyrick, 1916

Species of moth

Stenoma ancillaris is a moth of the family Depressariidae. It is found in Brazil and the Guianas.

The wingspan is about 16 mm. The forewings are light glossy violet grey, with the costal edge whitish ochreous and a black basal dot in the middle. The plical and second discal stigmata are black, the plical large. There is a slight blackish-grey oblique mark on the middle of the costa, and another at three-fourths, from which faint traces of a curved irregular series of dots proceed towards the tornus. A marginal series of small very indistinct blackish dots are found around the apex and termen. The hindwings are dark grey.
