= Stenoma sericata =

Scientific classification
- Domain: Eukaryota
- Kingdom: Animalia
- Phylum: Arthropoda
- Class: Insecta
- Order: Lepidoptera
- Family: Depressariidae
- Genus: Stenoma
- Species: S. sericata

Binomial name
- Stenoma sericata (Butler, 1877)

Synonyms
- Cryptolechia sericata Butler, 1877; Stenoma eminula Meyrick, 1915

Species of moth

Stenoma sericata is a moth of the family Depressariidae. It is found in Brazil (Amazonas) and French Guiana.

The wingspan is about 23 mm. The forewings are whitish fuscous, with a faint violet tinge and with the costal edge orange. The stigmata are small and dark fuscous, the plical obliquely beyond the first discal. There is a small dark fuscous spot on the middle of the costa, and a larger triangular one at four-fifths, where a curved series of dark fuscous dots runs to the dorsum before the tornus. There is also a terminal series of subquadrate dark fuscous dots. The hindwings are whitish yellowish, suffused with ochreous yellow towards the apex and upper part of the termen.
