= Stenoma aphrophanes =

Scientific classification
- Kingdom: Animalia
- Phylum: Arthropoda
- Class: Insecta
- Order: Lepidoptera
- Family: Depressariidae
- Genus: Stenoma
- Species: S. aphrophanes

Binomial name
- Stenoma aphrophanes Meyrick, 1929

Species of moth

Stenoma aphrophanes is a moth in the family Depressariidae. It was described by Edward Meyrick in 1929. It is found in São Paulo, Brazil.

The wingspan is 27–31 mm. The forewings are olive brown, paler and with whitish reflections except along the costa and termen and on a triangular patch in the disc about one-third. In males, there is a broad streak of whitish suffusion beneath the costa, interrupted in the middle, curved around before the apex parallel to the termen and running to the dorsum before the tornus, from the extremity of the anterior portion an irregular line runs to the second discal stigma, these markings are hardly indicated in females. The plical stigma is dark fuscous, the second discal forming a transverse fuscous mark, partially edged whitish. There is a whitish streak along the termen, in females slenderer and interrupted. The hindwings are fuscous.
