= Stenoma sesquitertia =

Scientific classification
- Domain: Eukaryota
- Kingdom: Animalia
- Phylum: Arthropoda
- Class: Insecta
- Order: Lepidoptera
- Family: Depressariidae
- Genus: Stenoma
- Species: S. sesquitertia

Binomial name
- Stenoma sesquitertia (Zeller, 1854)

Synonyms
- Cryptolechia sesquitertia Zeller, 1854; Cryptolechia graphiphorella Walker, 1864

Species of moth

Stenoma sesquitertia is a moth in the family Depressariidae. It was described by Philipp Christoph Zeller in 1854. It is found in Peru, the Guianas and Brazil.

Adults are pale fawn in colour, with forewings that are notably rounded at the tips, with the curve beginning before the end of the costa. There are three black spots positioned before the middle, and a black dot located in the disc beyond the middle. The first spot aligns with the dot, while the second spot is set further back than the first and slightly more toward the outer edge.

The third is elongate, and located behind the second. The hindwings are brownish cinereous.
