= Stenoma trilineata =

Scientific classification
- Kingdom: Animalia
- Phylum: Arthropoda
- Clade: Pancrustacea
- Class: Insecta
- Order: Lepidoptera
- Family: Depressariidae
- Genus: Stenoma
- Species: S. trilineata

Binomial name
- Stenoma trilineata (Butler, 1877)

Synonyms
- Cryptolechia trilineata Butler, 1877

Species of moth

Stenoma trilineata is a moth in the family Depressariidae. It was described by Arthur Gardiner Butler in 1877. It is found in the Amazon region of Brazil.

The wingspan is about 29 mm. The forewings are silver grey, with the base brownish and the basal third of the inner margin dark brown. There are three oblique irregular dark brown lines, externally diffused, crossing the wing at equal distances, the outermost one deeply and broadly excavated and macular. There is a marginal series of black spots. The hindwings are shining smoky brown, with the costal area silver and with a white marginal line.
