= Stenoma grandaeva =

Scientific classification
- Kingdom: Animalia
- Phylum: Arthropoda
- Clade: Pancrustacea
- Class: Insecta
- Order: Lepidoptera
- Family: Depressariidae
- Genus: Stenoma
- Species: S. grandaeva

Binomial name
- Stenoma grandaeva (Zeller, 1854)

Synonyms
- Cryptolechia grandaeva Zeller, 1854; Stenoma chrysogastra Meyrick, 1915

Species of moth

Stenoma grandaeva is a moth of the family Depressariidae. It is found in Brazil and French Guiana.

The wingspan is about 40 mm. The forewings are greenish grey with the plical stigma very small and white. There is a fine C-shaped white mark on the end of the cell, and a white dot beyond each of its points. The hindwings are rather dark grey.
