= Stenoma pustulatella =

Scientific classification
- Kingdom: Animalia
- Phylum: Arthropoda
- Class: Insecta
- Order: Lepidoptera
- Family: Depressariidae
- Genus: Stenoma
- Species: S. pustulatella

Binomial name
- Stenoma pustulatella (Walker, 1864)

Synonyms
- Cryptolechia pustulatella Walker, 1864

Species of moth

Stenoma pustulatella is a moth in the family Depressariidae. It was described by Francis Walker in 1864. It is found in Brazil.

Adults are silvery white, the forewings rounded at the tips, with ten cinereous elongated dots, which are positioned between the base and two-thirds of the length. The exterior border is convex, but not oblique. The hindwings have a slight aeneous tinge.
