= Antaeotricha teleosema =

Scientific classification
- Kingdom: Animalia
- Phylum: Arthropoda
- Clade: Pancrustacea
- Class: Insecta
- Order: Lepidoptera
- Family: Depressariidae
- Genus: Antaeotricha
- Species: A. teleosema

Binomial name
- Antaeotricha teleosema Meyrick, 1925

Species of moth

Antaeotricha teleosema is a moth in the family Depressariidae. It was described by Edward Meyrick in 1925. It is found in Brazil.

The wingspan is 16–17 mm. The forewings are shining white with the costa suffused dark grey from the base to beyond one-fourth, with an oblique cloudy streak from the extremity reaching half across the wing, and a shorter oblique projection midway between this and the base. There is some faint greyish suffusion above the middle of the disc and the second discal stigma forms a small dark fuscous slightly oblique mark seldom interrupted in the middle. A fuscous fascia is found from two-thirds of the costa to the tornus, well-defined posteriorly but suffused and indistinct anteriorly, especially towards the middle. There is also a suffused dark fuscous pre-marginal line preceded by some fuscous irroration around the apex and upper part of the termen, but leaving a white terminal line with five or six semicircular indentations. The hindwings are whitish suffused light grey on the posterior half, the apex slenderly white. The costa is dilated on the basal half, with a broad projection of white and dark grey scales before the middle and a light ochreous subcostal hairpencil becoming grey anteriorly and reaching from the base to three-fifths, lying beneath the forewings.
