= Stenoma crypsastra =

Scientific classification
- Domain: Eukaryota
- Kingdom: Animalia
- Phylum: Arthropoda
- Class: Insecta
- Order: Lepidoptera
- Family: Depressariidae
- Genus: Stenoma
- Species: S. crypsastra

Binomial name
- Stenoma crypsastra Meyrick, 1915

Species of moth

Stenoma crypsastra is a moth in the family Depressariidae. It was described by Edward Meyrick in 1915. It is found in Guyana and Brazil.

The wingspan is about 10 mm. The forewings are dark fuscous, faintly purplish tinged and with the apical margin slightly marked with white. The hindwings are dark fuscous with a rather large white spot in the middle of the disc.
