= Polygrammodes supremalis =

Scientific classification
- Kingdom: Animalia
- Phylum: Arthropoda
- Class: Insecta
- Order: Lepidoptera
- Family: Crambidae
- Genus: Polygrammodes
- Species: P. supremalis

Binomial name
- Polygrammodes supremalis Schaus, 1920

Species of moth

Polygrammodes supremalis is a moth in the family Crambidae. It was described by William Schaus in 1920. It is found in Paraná, Brazil.

The wingspan is about 43 mm. The base of the forewings, except the edge of the costa and inner margin broadly to the postmedial line, is fuscous brown shot with iridescent steel. This dark area is edged in front by a fuscous brown line preceded by a dark yellow line. An angled dark yellow line edged with fuscous brown is found medially on the inner margin and the postmedial area is pale brown. The medial pale yellow area forms a large irregular triangle with its base on the costa. There is a small spot in the cell, defined by some dark scales, and there is a yellow streak on the discocellular, edged by a reddish-brown line. The costa is yellow to the apex, only crossed by the postmedial line, which is fine, fuscous brown and shaded on either side with yellow. It is followed by an irregular, narrow greyish-purple shade from veins 2 to 5, and above vein 5 to vein 7 by a similar diverging shade. The termen is pale yellow and there is a fine brown terminal line. The base and inner margin of the hindwings is brownish purple.
