= Stenoma ochrothicta =

Scientific classification
- Domain: Eukaryota
- Kingdom: Animalia
- Phylum: Arthropoda
- Class: Insecta
- Order: Lepidoptera
- Family: Depressariidae
- Genus: Stenoma
- Species: S. ochrothicta

Binomial name
- Stenoma ochrothicta Meyrick, 1925

Species of moth

Stenoma ochrothicta is a moth of the family Depressariidae. It is found in Pará, Brazil.

The wingspan is about 12 mm. The forewings are dark purplish fuscous with the extreme costal edge pale ochreous yellowish except at the apex, and with a small suffused pale yellow-ochreous oblique spot on the costa beyond the middle. The hindwings are dark grey.
