= Stilbosis argyritis =

Scientific classification
- Kingdom: Animalia
- Phylum: Arthropoda
- Class: Insecta
- Order: Lepidoptera
- Family: Cosmopterigidae
- Genus: Stilbosis
- Species: S. argyritis

Binomial name
- Stilbosis argyritis Meyrick, 1922

Species of moth

Stilbosis argyritis is a moth in the family Cosmopterigidae. It was described by Edward Meyrick in 1922. It is found in Brazil.
