= Stenoma ulosema =

Scientific classification
- Domain: Eukaryota
- Kingdom: Animalia
- Phylum: Arthropoda
- Class: Insecta
- Order: Lepidoptera
- Family: Depressariidae
- Genus: Stenoma
- Species: S. ulosema

Binomial name
- Stenoma ulosema Meyrick, 1930

Species of moth

Stenoma ulosema is a moth in the family Depressariidae. It was described by Edward Meyrick in 1930. It is found in Brazil (Rio de Janeiro).

The wingspan is about 17 mm.
