= Metallocrates =

Scientific classification
- Kingdom: Animalia
- Phylum: Arthropoda
- Class: Insecta
- Order: Lepidoptera
- Family: Blastobasidae
- Genus: Metallocrates; Meyrick, 1930
- Species: M. transformata

Binomial name
- Metallocrates transformata Meyrick, 1930

Monotypic moth genus in family Blastobasidae

Metallocrates is a genus of moth in the family Blastobasidae. It contains the single species Metallocrates transformata, which is found in Brazil.
