= Antaeotricha binubila =

Scientific classification
- Kingdom: Animalia
- Phylum: Arthropoda
- Clade: Pancrustacea
- Class: Insecta
- Order: Lepidoptera
- Family: Depressariidae
- Genus: Antaeotricha
- Species: A. binubila

Binomial name
- Antaeotricha binubila Zeller, 1854

Synonyms
- Antaeotricha aporodes Meyrick, 1915

Species of moth in genus Antaeotricha

Antaeotricha binubila is a moth in the family Depressariidae. It was described by Philipp Christoph Zeller in 1854. It is found in Brazil (Amazonas) and Suriname.

The wingspan is 24–25 mm. The forewings are white, the dorsal half suffused with whitish-fuscous. There are two suffused transverse dark fuscous blotches on the dorsum in the middle and towards the tornus, reaching nearly half across the wing, the apex of the second giving rise to a short inwardly oblique streak of faint fuscous suffusion. A faint curved inwardly oblique fuscous shade from the tornus is more or less indicated for about half the breadth of the wing, in males continued by two or throe faint dots directed towards three-fourths of the costa. Two or three fuscous marginal dots are found around the apex. The hindwings in males are whitish tinged with grey on the posterior half, in females light grey or whitish. The costal margin in males is somewhat expanded to beyond the middle, with moderate projection of hairscales suffused with grey beneath, and a long whitish subcostal hairpencil lying beneath the forewings.
