= Antaeotricha argocorys =

Scientific classification
- Kingdom: Animalia
- Phylum: Arthropoda
- Clade: Pancrustacea
- Class: Insecta
- Order: Lepidoptera
- Family: Depressariidae
- Genus: Antaeotricha
- Species: A. argocorys

Binomial name
- Antaeotricha argocorys (Meyrick, 1931)

Synonyms
- Stenoma argocorys Meyrick, 1931

Species of moth in genus Antaeotricha

Antaeotricha argocorys is a moth in the family Depressariidae. It was described by Edward Meyrick in 1931. It is found in Brazil.
