= Microcolona transennata =

Scientific classification
- Domain: Eukaryota
- Kingdom: Animalia
- Phylum: Arthropoda
- Class: Insecta
- Order: Lepidoptera
- Family: Elachistidae
- Genus: Microcolona
- Species: M. transennata

Binomial name
- Microcolona transennata Meyrick, 1922

Species of moth

Microcolona transennata is a moth in the family Elachistidae. It is found in Brazil (Para) and Peru.

The wingspan is 7–8 mm. The forewings are dark purple-fuscous, the bases of the scales ochreous-whitish. There is an ochreous-yellowish elongate spot in the disc at one-fourth, preceded by a blackish tuft. The stigmata is represented by blackish tufts. The plical is placed obliquely before the first discal and is partially edged with ochreous-yellowish. A transverse tuft extends from the second discal to the tornus and there is an ochreous-yellow streak from the costa before the middle just beneath the costa at two-thirds, followed by an oblique wedge-shaped ochreous-yellow mark from the costa. There is an ochreous-yellow line along the posterior part of the fold and an ochreous-yellow dot towards the apex and two or three variable dots or marks in the apical area. The hindwings are dark grey.
