= Stenoma melanixa =

Scientific classification
- Kingdom: Animalia
- Phylum: Arthropoda
- Class: Insecta
- Order: Lepidoptera
- Family: Depressariidae
- Genus: Stenoma
- Species: S. melanixa

Binomial name
- Stenoma melanixa Meyrick, 1912

Synonyms
- Stenoma acrosticta Walsingham, 1913

Species of moth

Stenoma melanixa is a moth of the family Depressariidae. It is found in Colombia, Guatemala and Brazil (Amazonas).

The wingspan is about 26 mm. The forewings are fuscous, paler in the disc, the costa suffused with ferruginous brown, darkest on the edge, the lower edge with faint projections at one-third and two-thirds. The second discal stigma is indicated by a minute linear-transverse mark of several dark fuscous scales and there is a slender streak of blackish suffusion along the dorsum from one-fourth to near the tornus, as well as an indistinct conical projection of dark fuscous irroration reaching from the dorsum at three-fourths half across the wing. There is also a narrow whitish-grey terminal fascia, preceded on the costa by a small black spot. The hindwings are rather dark fuscous.
