= Antaeotricha neurographa =

Scientific classification
- Kingdom: Animalia
- Phylum: Arthropoda
- Class: Insecta
- Order: Lepidoptera
- Family: Depressariidae
- Genus: Antaeotricha
- Species: A. neurographa

Binomial name
- Antaeotricha neurographa Meyrick, 1922

Species of moth

Antaeotricha neurographa is a moth in the family Depressariidae. It was described by Edward Meyrick in 1922. It is found in Brazil.

The wingspan is about 25 mm. The forewings are whitish-ochreous, obscurely infuscated between the veins, especially beneath the middle of the disc and beyond the cell, all veins marked with fine fuscous lines. There are cloudy dark fuscous dots at the origin of veins 11 and 10, and at the angles of the cell, as well as a marginal series of dark fuscous dots around the posterior part of the costa and termen, on the costa rather elongate. The hindwings are ochreous-whitish-grey.
