= Stenoma bryocosma =

Scientific classification
- Kingdom: Animalia
- Phylum: Arthropoda
- Clade: Pancrustacea
- Class: Insecta
- Order: Lepidoptera
- Family: Depressariidae
- Genus: Stenoma
- Species: S. bryocosma

Binomial name
- Stenoma bryocosma Meyrick, 1916

Species of moth

Stenoma bryocosma is a moth of the family Depressariidae. It is found in French Guiana and Brazil.

The wingspan is about 35 mm. The forewings are pale whitish fuscous, the costal edge whitish, suffused with greenish towards the base, as well as a green dot beneath the costa at one-fourth. There is a suffused yellow-greenish streak mixed irregularly with dark grey green from the base beneath the costa to beyond the middle, where it is enlarged into a costal spot, edged with blackish on the costa, then continued obliquely downwards to a dark spot in the disc beyond the cell. A similar streak is found from one-fourth of the dorsum converging to the same costal spot. The second discal stigma is dark green, transverse-linear, with an indistinct line of dark grey irroration running from this directly to the dorsum. There is a strongly curved row of grey-green dots from two-thirds of the costa to the dorsum before the tornus and there are three small black marks on the costa posteriorly. There is also a terminal series of grey dots. The hindwings are whitish grey.
