= Basanasca =

Scientific classification
- Kingdom: Animalia
- Phylum: Arthropoda
- Clade: Pancrustacea
- Class: Insecta
- Order: Lepidoptera
- Family: Tineidae
- Genus: Basanasca; Meyrick, 1922
- Species: B. parcens

Binomial name
- Basanasca parcens Meyrick, 1922

Genus of moths

Basanasca is a genus of moths belonging to the family Tineidae. It contains only one species, Basanasca parcens, which is found in Brazil.
