= Colpocrita =

Scientific classification
- Kingdom: Animalia
- Phylum: Arthropoda
- Clade: Pancrustacea
- Class: Insecta
- Order: Lepidoptera
- Family: Tineidae
- Genus: Colpocrita; Meyrick, 1930
- Species: C. diptila

Binomial name
- Colpocrita diptila Meyrick, 1930

Genus of moths

Colpocrita is a genus of moths belonging to the family Tineidae. It contains only one species, Colpocrita diptila, which is found in Brazil.
