= Compsolechia incurva =

Scientific classification
- Kingdom: Animalia
- Phylum: Arthropoda
- Clade: Pancrustacea
- Class: Insecta
- Order: Lepidoptera
- Family: Gelechiidae
- Genus: Compsolechia
- Species: C. incurva

Binomial name
- Compsolechia incurva (Meyrick, 1914)

Synonyms
- Anacampsis incurva Meyrick, 1914

Species of moth

Compsolechia incurva is a moth of the family Gelechiidae. It was described by Edward Meyrick in 1914. It is found in Guyana, Brazil and Peru.

The wingspan is 17–19 mm. The forewings are brown anteriorly, or more or less wholly suffused with dark grey and with a narrow dark brown fascia at about one-fifth, angulated above the middle. The second discal stigma is obscurely dark fuscous and there are undefined patches of dark brown or dark fuscous suffusion on the costa and dorsum from the middle to the subterminal line. A fine white subterminal line is found from four-fifths of the costa to the tornus, curved inwards on the upper half and slightly outwards on the lower. There is a small black spot suffused with deep brown near the costa before the apex, and a short black dash near the termen beneath the apex. The hindwings are blackish grey.
