= Compsolechia mniocosma =

Scientific classification
- Kingdom: Animalia
- Phylum: Arthropoda
- Clade: Pancrustacea
- Class: Insecta
- Order: Lepidoptera
- Family: Gelechiidae
- Genus: Compsolechia
- Species: C. mniocosma

Binomial name
- Compsolechia mniocosma Meyrick, 1922

Species of moth

Compsolechia mniocosma is a moth of the family Gelechiidae. It was described by Edward Meyrick in 1922. It is found in Peru.

The wingspan is about 15 mm. The forewings are moss green, whitish tinged towards the base, more bluish tinged towards the dorsum and termen and with a deep green dot near the base in the middle. There is a deep green rather oblique fasciate streak from the dorsum towards the base reaching more than half way across the wing, the posterior edge forming a triangular prominence on the fold, edged with white and continued as a suffused white line along the fold. The stigmata are obscurely deeper, with the discal approximated and the plical before the first discal. There is a fine white very oblique strigula from the costa at three-fourths and a streak of irregular white suffusion from the disc at three-fourths to the costa before the apex, beneath this an oval black spot almost at the apex. There are five white pre-terminal dots, between the second and third a fine black dash. The hindwings are dark fuscous, with a light grey expansible hair-pencil lying in the submedian groove.
