= Compsolechia metadupa =

Scientific classification
- Kingdom: Animalia
- Phylum: Arthropoda
- Clade: Pancrustacea
- Class: Insecta
- Order: Lepidoptera
- Family: Gelechiidae
- Genus: Compsolechia
- Species: C. metadupa

Binomial name
- Compsolechia metadupa (Walsingham, 1910)

Synonyms
- Anacampsis metadupa Walsingham, 1910

Species of moth

Compsolechia metadupa is a moth of the family Gelechiidae. It was described by Thomas de Grey, 6th Baron Walsingham, in 1910. It is found in Mexico (Tabasco).

The wingspan is 11–12 mm. There are olivaceous greenish and bronzy brownish reflections on the forewings and a broad plumbeous band near the base, running obliquely outward from the dorsum to the costa, is narrowly reduplicated beyond. From the middle of the dorsum arises a similar plumbeous band, which, attaining the costa obliquely before the cilia, is margined on its inner side by a somewhat triangular brownish fuscous costal spot, and on its outer side by a dorsal shade of the same colour. A triangular patch enclosing the apex and termen, with a dark line running through the middle of the cinereous terminal cilia, is also dark brownish fuscous, and is margined on its inner side by a pale cinereous line. The hindwings are dark chocolate-brown.
