= Compsolechia inusta =

Scientific classification
- Kingdom: Animalia
- Phylum: Arthropoda
- Clade: Pancrustacea
- Class: Insecta
- Order: Lepidoptera
- Family: Gelechiidae
- Genus: Compsolechia
- Species: C. inusta

Binomial name
- Compsolechia inusta (Meyrick, 1914)

Synonyms
- Anacampsis inusta Meyrick, 1914

Moth of the family Gelechiidae

Compsolechia inusta is a moth of the family Gelechiidae. It was described by Edward Meyrick in 1914. It is found in Guyana.

The wingspan is about 10 mgm. The forewings are dark grey, slightly sprinkled with whitish, the costal edge blackish from the base to the middle, where it is terminated by an oblique spot. There is a very oblique thick blackish streak from one-sixth of the dorsum to two-fifths of the disc. The discal stigmata are obscurely indicated with a very fine hardly incurved subterminal line from four-fifths of the costa to the tornus, slightly edged anteriorly with dark fuscous, on the costa by a patch of dark fuscous suffusion only separated from the median spot by a few whitish specks. There is a costal patch of fine whitish irroration (speckles) beyond this. There are also two fine black longitudinal strigulae, touching the costa towards the apex, and two others touching the termen towards the middle. The hindwings are dark fuscous.
