= Compsolechia anthracura =

Scientific classification
- Kingdom: Animalia
- Phylum: Arthropoda
- Clade: Pancrustacea
- Class: Insecta
- Order: Lepidoptera
- Family: Gelechiidae
- Genus: Compsolechia
- Species: C. anthracura

Binomial name
- Compsolechia anthracura (Meyrick, 1914)

Synonyms
- Anacampsis anthracura Meyrick, 1914

Species of moth

Compsolechia anthracura is a moth of the family Gelechiidae. It was described by Edward Meyrick in 1914. It is found in Guyana and Brazil.

The wingspan is 14–17 mm. The forewings are ochreous brown, from near the base to two-thirds irrorated (sprinkled) with blackish and sometimes partially tinged with whitish. There is an elongate suffused black patch along the posterior fourth of the dorsum to the tornus and a fine subterminal line of more or less scattered white scales, moderately curved outwards. A black dash is found towards the costa above the apex and there are two black dashes towards the termen in the middle, more or less edged with white suffusion, often forming a transverse white pre-terminal blotch. The hindwings are blackish with the submedian fold in males furnished with long hairs towards the base.
