= Compsolechia phaeotoxa =

Scientific classification
- Kingdom: Animalia
- Phylum: Arthropoda
- Clade: Pancrustacea
- Class: Insecta
- Order: Lepidoptera
- Family: Gelechiidae
- Genus: Compsolechia
- Species: C. phaeotoxa

Binomial name
- Compsolechia phaeotoxa Meyrick, 1922

Species of moth

Compsolechia phaeotoxa is a moth of the family Gelechiidae. It was described by Edward Meyrick in 1922. It is found in Amazonas, Brazil.

The wingspan is about 13 mm. The forewings are leaden grey, with the stigmata in one example perceptible, cloudy and darker grey, the discal approximated, the plical rather before the first discal, but usually these stigmata are wholly obsolete. There is a dark fuscous, slightly incurved fascia from five-sixths of the costa to the tornus, anteriorly suffused, posteriorly well defined. Two or three cloudy dark fuscous dots are found on the upper part of the termen. The hindwings are dark fuscous.
