= Compsolechia stelliferella =

Scientific classification
- Kingdom: Animalia
- Phylum: Arthropoda
- Clade: Pancrustacea
- Class: Insecta
- Order: Lepidoptera
- Family: Gelechiidae
- Genus: Compsolechia
- Species: C. stelliferella

Binomial name
- Compsolechia stelliferella (Walker, 1864)

Synonyms
- Gelechia stelliferella Walker, 1864; Gelechia speciosella Walker, 1864

Species of moth

Compsolechia stelliferella is a moth of the family Gelechiidae. It was described by Francis Walker in 1864. It is found in Guatemala, Peru and Amazonas, Brazil.

The wingspan is 12–13 mm. The forewings are rich dark brown, with a metallic bluish spot at the extreme base of the costa, and five snow-white spots, one costal, at two-thirds of the wing length, one dorsal, at three-fourths, one on the disc, before the middle, one at the lower angle of the cell and one below the fold, nearer to the base. The hindwings are dark brownish fuscous.
