= Compsolechia sporozona =

Scientific classification
- Kingdom: Animalia
- Phylum: Arthropoda
- Clade: Pancrustacea
- Class: Insecta
- Order: Lepidoptera
- Family: Gelechiidae
- Genus: Compsolechia
- Species: C. sporozona

Binomial name
- Compsolechia sporozona (Meyrick, 1914)

Synonyms
- Anacampsis sporozona Meyrick, 1914

Species of moth

Compsolechia sporozona is a moth of the family Gelechiidae. It was described by Edward Meyrick in 1914. It is found in Guyana, Brazil and Peru.

The wingspan is 13–16 mm. The forewings are blackish, the markings formed of white irroration (sprinkles). There is a narrow basal fascia, widest on the dorsum, as well as a broad oblique antemedian fascia, sometimes connected on the dorsum with the basal, marked with a more or less distinct blackish spot representing the plical stigma. There is a broad postmedian direct fascia, not reaching the dorsum, marked with a round blackish spot representing the second discal stigma. There is also a slightly curved subterminal shade and a slender streak along the termen. The basal third of the hindwings is grey, around the apex sometimes whitish tinged towards the tips.
