= Compsolechia dryocrossa =

Scientific classification
- Kingdom: Animalia
- Phylum: Arthropoda
- Clade: Pancrustacea
- Class: Insecta
- Order: Lepidoptera
- Family: Gelechiidae
- Genus: Compsolechia
- Species: C. dryocrossa

Binomial name
- Compsolechia dryocrossa Meyrick, 1922

Species of moth

Compsolechia dryocrossa is a moth of the family Gelechiidae. It was described by Edward Meyrick in 1922. It is found in the Brazilian states of Amazonas and Pará.

The wingspan is 16–17 mm. The forewings are ochreous fuscous, irrorated (sprinkled) with ochreous whitish, with the costal edge fuscous from the base to three-fourths and with indistinct fuscous dots above the fold near the base and at one-fifth. The stigmata are very indistinct, cloudy and fuscous, with the discal approximated, the plical slightly before the first discal. There is a very faint paler shade, hardly traceable, from four-fifths of the costa to the tornus, indented above the middle. The hindwings are dark grey.
