= Compsolechia accinctella =

Scientific classification
- Kingdom: Animalia
- Phylum: Arthropoda
- Clade: Pancrustacea
- Class: Insecta
- Order: Lepidoptera
- Family: Gelechiidae
- Genus: Compsolechia
- Species: C. accinctella

Binomial name
- Compsolechia accinctella (Walker, 1864)

Synonyms
- Gelechia accinctella Walker, 1864

Species of moth

Compsolechia accinctella is a moth of the family Gelechiidae. It was described by Francis Walker in 1864. It is found in Amazonas in Brazil and in Peru.

Adults are dark cupreous brown, with the forewings thinly and minutely cinereous (ash gray) speckled and with a ferruginous band near the base, as well as a white transverse bi-denticulate line at five-sixths of the length, with three deep black streaks between it and the whitish marginal line.
