= Compsolechia succincta =

Scientific classification
- Kingdom: Animalia
- Phylum: Arthropoda
- Clade: Pancrustacea
- Class: Insecta
- Order: Lepidoptera
- Family: Gelechiidae
- Genus: Compsolechia
- Species: C. succincta

Binomial name
- Compsolechia succincta (Walsingham, 1910)

Synonyms
- Anacampsis succincta Walsingham, 1910

Species of moth

Compsolechia succincta is a moth of the family Gelechiidae. It was described by Thomas de Grey, 6th Baron Walsingham, in 1910. It is found in Mexico (Tabasco) and Jamaica.

The wingspan is about 8.5 mm. The forewings are pale brownish grey, indistinctly spotted with brownish fuscous, of which there is a slender streak along the base of the costa, an elongate spot on the middle of the cell, another in the fold preceding it, and one at the base of the dorsum. On the outer third of the wing a transverse brownish fuscous shade, especially conspicuous on the costa, follows the outline of a narrow whitish cinereous fascia, sharply angulated outward at its middle. Beyond this, the terminal area is pale cinereous, outlined with darker shading, most conspicuous on the costa before, and on the termen below the apex. The hindwings are brownish grey.
