= Compsolechia orthophracta =

Scientific classification
- Kingdom: Animalia
- Phylum: Arthropoda
- Clade: Pancrustacea
- Class: Insecta
- Order: Lepidoptera
- Family: Gelechiidae
- Genus: Compsolechia
- Species: C. orthophracta

Binomial name
- Compsolechia orthophracta (Meyrick, 1914)

Synonyms
- Anacampsis orthophracta Meyrick, 1914

Species of moth

Compsolechia orthophracta is a moth of the family Gelechiidae. It was described by Edward Meyrick in 1914. It is found in Guyana.

The wingspan is about 12 mm. The forewings are dark fuscous with four dark blue-leaden direct transverse fasciae, the first narrow and basal, sometimes connected with the second on the dorsum, the second at one-third is broad, the third postmedian and broad, the fourth from four-fifths of the costa to the tornus is narrow. There is a slender blue-leaden streak along the termen. The hindwings are dark fuscous.
