= Compsolechia chelidonia =

Scientific classification
- Kingdom: Animalia
- Phylum: Arthropoda
- Clade: Pancrustacea
- Class: Insecta
- Order: Lepidoptera
- Family: Gelechiidae
- Genus: Compsolechia
- Species: C. chelidonia

Binomial name
- Compsolechia chelidonia Meyrick, 1922

Species of moth

Compsolechia chelidonia is a moth of the family Gelechiidae. It was described by Edward Meyrick in 1922. It is found in Amazonas, Brazil.

The wingspan is about 17 mm. The forewings are dark purple fuscous, irregularly irrorated (sprinkled) with whitish and with a triangular blackish blotch extending on the costa from one-third to three-fifths, the apex reaching the fold. There is a thick blackish streak from the disc beyond the middle to the apex, above suffused and with two slender interneural streaks, beneath on the posterior half edged with ochreous-whitish suffusion extending to the termen and produced slenderly along the lower part of the termen, the area between the anterior half and the dorsum free from whitish irroration. The hindwings are dark fuscous with a long dark grey erectile hair-pencil lying in the sub median fold.
