= Compsolechia monochromella =

Scientific classification
- Kingdom: Animalia
- Phylum: Arthropoda
- Clade: Pancrustacea
- Class: Insecta
- Order: Lepidoptera
- Family: Gelechiidae
- Genus: Compsolechia
- Species: C. monochromella

Binomial name
- Compsolechia monochromella (Walker, 1864)

Synonyms
- Gelechia monochromella Walker, 1864; Gelechia displicitella Walker, 1864

Species of moth

Compsolechia monochromella is a moth of the family Gelechiidae. It was described by Francis Walker in 1864. It is found in Amazonas in Brazil and in Peru.

Adults are cinereous (ash gray) brown, more cinereous and tinged with aeneous (bronze) beneath and the forewings with very indistinct darker speckles and three indistinct blackish marks in a line near the costa. The space towards the exterior border is rather paler and the marginal points are blackish and very minute. The hindwings have a cupreous tinge, a little darker than the forewings.
