= Compsolechia leucorrhapta =

Scientific classification
- Kingdom: Animalia
- Phylum: Arthropoda
- Clade: Pancrustacea
- Class: Insecta
- Order: Lepidoptera
- Family: Gelechiidae
- Genus: Compsolechia
- Species: C. leucorrhapta

Binomial name
- Compsolechia leucorrhapta (Meyrick, 1914)

Synonyms
- Anacampsis leucorrhapta Meyrick, 1914

Species of moth

Compsolechia leucorrhapta is a moth of the family Gelechiidae. It was described by Edward Meyrick in 1914. It is found in Guyana.

The wingspan is about 14 mm. The forewings are dark fuscous, sometimes slightly sprinkled with whitish and with a black dot near the base in the middle. There is a suffused black spot on the fold at one-fifth. The stigmata are faintly indicated and there is a fine slightly interrupted white subterminal line from three-fourths of the costa to the tornus, angulated in the middle. An oval black spot is found near the costa before the apex, and a short black dash above it. There is also a clear white dash towards the apex, with several indistinct short whitish marks between this and the tornus more or less indicated, and a black dash before the termen in the middle. The hindwings are dark fuscous.
