= Compsolechia scutella =

Scientific classification
- Kingdom: Animalia
- Phylum: Arthropoda
- Clade: Pancrustacea
- Class: Insecta
- Order: Lepidoptera
- Family: Gelechiidae
- Genus: Compsolechia
- Species: C. scutella

Binomial name
- Compsolechia scutella (Zeller, 1877)

Synonyms
- Gelechia (Ceratophora) scutella Zeller, 1877

Species of moth

Compsolechia scutella is a moth of the family Gelechiidae. It was described by Philipp Christoph Zeller in 1877. It is found in the Neotropical realm.
