= Compsolechia crescentifasciella =

Scientific classification
- Kingdom: Animalia
- Phylum: Arthropoda
- Clade: Pancrustacea
- Class: Insecta
- Order: Lepidoptera
- Family: Gelechiidae
- Genus: Compsolechia
- Species: C. crescentifasciella

Binomial name
- Compsolechia crescentifasciella (Chambers, 1874)

Synonyms
- Gelechia crescentifasciella Chambers, 1874

Species of moth

Compsolechia crescentifasciella is a moth of the family Gelechiidae. It was described by Vactor Tousey Chambers in 1874. It is found in North America, where it has been recorded from Texas.

Adults are ash gray, microscopically dusted with brown. There is a crescentic, very indistinct pale fascia at the beginning of the cilia, very concave towards the base of the wing. There are also one or two minute dark spots on the disc, and one at its apex.
