= Compsolechia loxogramma =

Scientific classification
- Kingdom: Animalia
- Phylum: Arthropoda
- Clade: Pancrustacea
- Class: Insecta
- Order: Lepidoptera
- Family: Gelechiidae
- Genus: Compsolechia
- Species: C. loxogramma

Binomial name
- Compsolechia loxogramma Meyrick, 1922

Species of moth

Compsolechia loxogramma is a moth of the family Gelechiidae. It was described by Edward Meyrick in 1922. It is found in Amazonas, Brazil.

The wingspan is 12–13 mm. The forewings are leaden grey with a blackish dot on the base of the costa and a blackish rather oblique streak from the base of the dorsum not reaching the costa. There is an angulated transverse blackish streak at one-fifth sometimes variably interrupted. An ochreous subcostal streak is found from near the base to the middle interrupted by this. There is a blackish fascia from the middle of the costa to before the middle of the dorsum, narrowed in the disc and preceded by ochreous suffusion, broader towards the dorsum and followed on the dorsum by a suffused white spot, sometimes nearly obsolete. Beyond this is a short dark fuscous mark in the disc and one on the fold. There is also a triangular blotch of blackish suffusion on the dorsum at about three-fourths and a slightly irregular oblique whitish line from the costa at three-fourths to the tornus, space between this and the preceding forming a fascia of pale yellow- ochreous suffusion. The apical area beyond this line is wholly suffused blackish. The hindwings are dark fuscous.
