= Compsolechia petromorpha =

Scientific classification
- Kingdom: Animalia
- Phylum: Arthropoda
- Clade: Pancrustacea
- Class: Insecta
- Order: Lepidoptera
- Family: Gelechiidae
- Genus: Compsolechia
- Species: C. petromorpha

Binomial name
- Compsolechia petromorpha Meyrick, 1922

Species of moth

Compsolechia petromorpha is a moth of the family Gelechiidae. It was described by Edward Meyrick in 1922. It is found in Peru and Amazonas, Brazil.

The wingspan is about 12 mm for males and 14 mm for females. The forewings are uniform rather dark violet grey. The hindwings are dark grey, in males with a long light violet-grey hair-pencil lying in the median fold and reaching the end of the cell, and a shorter but denser light grey hair-pencil in the submedian fold.
