= Compsolechia mesodelta =

Scientific classification
- Kingdom: Animalia
- Phylum: Arthropoda
- Clade: Pancrustacea
- Class: Insecta
- Order: Lepidoptera
- Family: Gelechiidae
- Genus: Compsolechia
- Species: C. mesodelta

Binomial name
- Compsolechia mesodelta Meyrick, 1922

Species of moth

Compsolechia mesodelta is a moth of the family Gelechiidae. It was described by Edward Meyrick in 1922. It is found in Amazonas, Brazil.

The wingspan is 10–11 mm. The forewings are grey with a faint greenish tinge, sometimes sprinkled with whitish. There is a triangular blackish blotch on the middle of the costa reaching half way across the wing and a faint pale somewhat irregular line from four-fifths of the costa to the tornus, the costal and terminal area beyond this suffused with blackish, in the whitish-sprinkled example a terminal line of whitish irroration. The hindwings are dark fuscous.
