= Compsolechia tardella =

Scientific classification
- Kingdom: Animalia
- Phylum: Arthropoda
- Clade: Pancrustacea
- Class: Insecta
- Order: Lepidoptera
- Family: Gelechiidae
- Genus: Compsolechia
- Species: C. tardella

Binomial name
- Compsolechia tardella (Walker, 1864)

Synonyms
- Gelechia tardella Walker, 1864; Gelechia sublatella Walker, 1864; Gelechia collocatella Walker, 1864

Species of moth

Compsolechia tardella is a moth of the family Gelechiidae. It was described by Francis Walker in 1864. It is found in Peru and Amazonas, Brazil.

Adults are blackish brown, the forewings irregularly cinereous (ash-gray) speckled, with two or three black occasionally obsolete spots in the disc and a few white and deep black submarginal streaks. The hindwings are dark cupreous brown.
