= Compsolechia picticornis =

Scientific classification
- Kingdom: Animalia
- Phylum: Arthropoda
- Clade: Pancrustacea
- Class: Insecta
- Order: Lepidoptera
- Family: Gelechiidae
- Genus: Compsolechia
- Species: C. picticornis

Binomial name
- Compsolechia picticornis (Walsingham, 1897)

Synonyms
- Aristotelia picticornis Walsingham, 1897

Species of moth

Compsolechia picticornis is a moth of the family Gelechiidae. It was described by Thomas de Grey, 6th Baron Walsingham, in 1897. It is found in the West Indies, where it has been recorded from St. Croix and Puerto Rico.

The wingspan is about 10 mm. The forewings are brownish fuscous, evenly speckled and mottled with ashy grey throughout and with a faint indication of a dark spot beyond the middle of the fold and groups of ashy-grey scales around the termen at the base of the ashy-grey cilia, through which run a slender dark dividing line beyond their middle. The hindwings are pale chestnut-grey.
