= Compsolechia eurygypsa =

Scientific classification
- Kingdom: Animalia
- Phylum: Arthropoda
- Clade: Pancrustacea
- Class: Insecta
- Order: Lepidoptera
- Family: Gelechiidae
- Genus: Compsolechia
- Species: C. eurygypsa

Binomial name
- Compsolechia eurygypsa Meyrick, 1922

Species of moth

Compsolechia eurygypsa is a moth of the family Gelechiidae. It was described by Edward Meyrick in 1922. It is found in Peru.

The wingspan is 8–9 mm. The forewings are grey with a blackish dot towards the costa at the base and a rounded blackish spot on the fold at one-fourth. The stigmata are cloudy and obscurely darker, sometimes with one or two adjacent lateral whitish scales, the plical beneath first discal. There is a strong irregular white line from four-fifths of the costa to the tornus, preceded by a broad fascia of dark fuscous suffusion, in two specimens the line is less developed and interrupted beneath the costa. Beyond this is a dark fuscous streak or irregular patch along the costa, and three rather large white pre-terminal dots, sometimes absorbed in ochreous-whitish suffusion occupying the apical area except the margins. The hindwings are dark fuscous.
