= Compsolechia sesamodes =

Scientific classification
- Kingdom: Animalia
- Phylum: Arthropoda
- Clade: Pancrustacea
- Class: Insecta
- Order: Lepidoptera
- Family: Gelechiidae
- Genus: Compsolechia
- Species: C. sesamodes

Binomial name
- Compsolechia sesamodes Meyrick, 1922

Species of moth

Compsolechia sesamodes is a moth of the family Gelechiidae. It was described by Edward Meyrick in 1922. It is found in Brazil and Peru.

The wingspan is about 15 mm. The forewings are dark grey with a blackish spot towards the costa near the base and a transverse blackish fascia from the dorsum at one-fifth not reaching the costa, the outer edge angulated on the fold. The plical and first discal stigmata are indicated by elongate blackish spots, both followed by spots of white irroration (sprinkles), some white irroration towards the costa above these. There is a fascia of blackish suffusion preceding the subterminal line. A fine transverse white mark is found from the costa beyond three-fourths, and small groups of two or three white scales forming a series from this to the dorsum before the tornus, angulated in the middle of the wing, rather incurved on the lower half. The apical area is suffused with dark brown, with an oval black spot beneath the costa near the apex, an indistinct blackish pre-terminal dot beneath the apex, two linear white pre-terminal dots above this and four minute ones below it. The hindwings are dark fuscous with a long pale greyish expansible hair-pencil lying in the submedian fold.
