= Compsolechia desectella =

Scientific classification
- Kingdom: Animalia
- Phylum: Arthropoda
- Clade: Pancrustacea
- Class: Insecta
- Order: Lepidoptera
- Family: Gelechiidae
- Genus: Compsolechia
- Species: C. desectella

Binomial name
- Compsolechia desectella (Zeller, 1877)

Synonyms
- Gelechia (Tachyptilia) desectella Zeller, 1877

Species of moth

Compsolechia desectella is a moth of the family Gelechiidae. It was described by Philipp Christoph Zeller in 1877. It is found in Cuba.
