= Compsolechia transjectella =

Scientific classification
- Kingdom: Animalia
- Phylum: Arthropoda
- Clade: Pancrustacea
- Class: Insecta
- Order: Lepidoptera
- Family: Gelechiidae
- Genus: Compsolechia
- Species: C. transjectella

Binomial name
- Compsolechia transjectella (Walker, 1864)

Synonyms
- Gelechia transjectella Walker, 1864

Species of moth

Compsolechia transjectella is a moth of the family Gelechiidae. It was described by Francis Walker in 1864. It is found in Peru and Amazonas, Brazil.

Adults are blackish, the forewings with minute cinereous (ash-gray) speckles and a few slight cinereous streaklets, as well as a transverse denticulated cinereous line at four-fifths of the length. The submarginal points are deep black, marked with white. There is a ferruginous marginal line and the costa is oblique towards the tip. The hindwings are dark brown.
