= Compsolechia pentastra =

Scientific classification
- Kingdom: Animalia
- Phylum: Arthropoda
- Clade: Pancrustacea
- Class: Insecta
- Order: Lepidoptera
- Family: Gelechiidae
- Genus: Compsolechia
- Species: C. pentastra

Binomial name
- Compsolechia pentastra Meyrick, 1922

Species of moth

Compsolechia pentastra is a moth of the family Gelechiidae. It was described by Edward Meyrick in 1922. It is found in Peru and the Brazilian states of Amazonas and Pará.

The wingspan is 12–14 mm. The forewings are bronzy blackish with a small dark metallic-blue spot at the base and a white dot on the fold at one-fourth of the wing, one beneath the costa before the middle, one in the disc beyond the middle and short opposite transverse marks from the costa and the dorsum near beyond this. The hindwings are dark bronzy fuscous.
