= Compsolechia molybdina =

Scientific classification
- Kingdom: Animalia
- Phylum: Arthropoda
- Clade: Pancrustacea
- Class: Insecta
- Order: Lepidoptera
- Family: Gelechiidae
- Genus: Compsolechia
- Species: C. molybdina

Binomial name
- Compsolechia molybdina (Walsingham, 1910)

Synonyms
- Anacampsis molybdina Walsingham, 1910

Species of insect

Compsolechia molybdina is a moth of the family Gelechiidae. It was described by Thomas de Grey, 6th Baron Walsingham, in 1910. It is found in Mexico (Guerrero).

== Description ==
The wingspan is about 14 mm. The forewings are shining, purplish-grey, with an inwardly diffused transverse fascia on the outer third, angulated outward about its middle and bounded along its outer edge by an indistinct narrow pale line, beyond which, after a slight purplish shade, the remainder of the wing to the apex is slaty grey, rather paler than the basal part. Around the termen and around the depressed obtusely angulated apex runs a blackish line at the base of the pale slaty grey cilia. The hindwings are brown.

== Attributes ==
Compsolechia molybdina has the following traits:

- Refracting superposition eyes
- Wing morphology
- Behavioral circadian rhythm
