= Compsolechia abruptella =

Scientific classification
- Kingdom: Animalia
- Phylum: Arthropoda
- Clade: Pancrustacea
- Class: Insecta
- Order: Lepidoptera
- Family: Gelechiidae
- Genus: Compsolechia
- Species: C. abruptella

Binomial name
- Compsolechia abruptella (Walker, 1864)

Synonyms
- Gelechia abruptella Walker, 1864; Gelechia sectella Walker, 1864

Species of moth

Compsolechia abruptella is a moth of the family Gelechiidae. It was described by Francis Walker in 1864. It is found in Amazonas in Brazil and in Peru.

Adults are cinereous (ash gray) brown, the forewings with a black basal point and a black spot in the disc near the base and a white line extending obliquely outward from two-thirds of the length of the costa, and forming a very acute angle, contiguous on the inner side with two longitudinal black streaks. The space between this line and the exterior border has a slaty tinge, and contains some minute white streaks and one minute black streak, which seems to be a continuation of the hinder end of the black streaks. There is also a broad black streak along the apical part of the costa and the marginal line is cinereous. The hindwings are cupreous brown.
