= Compsolechia niphocentra =

Scientific classification
- Kingdom: Animalia
- Phylum: Arthropoda
- Clade: Pancrustacea
- Class: Insecta
- Order: Lepidoptera
- Family: Gelechiidae
- Genus: Compsolechia
- Species: C. niphocentra

Binomial name
- Compsolechia niphocentra Meyrick, 1922

Species of moth

Compsolechia niphocentra is a moth of the family Gelechiidae. It was described by Edward Meyrick in 1922. It is found in Peru and Amazonas, Brazil.

The wingspan is 12–14 mm. The forewings are dark grey, slightly whitish speckled and with a small black spot towards the costa at the base. There is a round black spot on the fold at one-fifth. The stigmata are indicated by whitish dots, sometimes little apparent, the plical beneath the first discal. An oblique white strigula is found from the costa at three-fourths, where a fine incomplete line of white scales runs to the dorsum before the tornus, acutely angulated in the middle, often little marked above this, rather incurved on the lower half. There is a roundish blackish spot near the costa before the apex, usually edged white above, and four white elongate dots before the upper part of the termen, between the second and third a slight usually indistinct blackish mark towards the termen. The hindwings are dark fuscous, in males with a slender ochreous-whitish hair-pencil in the subdorsal groove.
