= Compsolechia suspectella =

Scientific classification
- Kingdom: Animalia
- Phylum: Arthropoda
- Clade: Pancrustacea
- Class: Insecta
- Order: Lepidoptera
- Family: Gelechiidae
- Genus: Compsolechia
- Species: C. suspectella

Binomial name
- Compsolechia suspectella (Walker, 1864)

Synonyms
- Gelechia suspectella Walker, 1864

Species of moth

Compsolechia suspectella is a moth of the family Gelechiidae. It was described by Francis Walker in 1864. It is found in Amazonas, Brazil.

Adults are dark cupreous brown, the forewings tinged with metallic green and with a few black points in the disc near the base. The exterior white line is obsolete, with the exception of a white streak, which extends obliquely from the costa. There are a few small white and deep black longitudinal streaks nearer the exterior border, which is convex and slightly oblique. The marginal line is cinereous (ash gray).
