= Compsolechia plumbeolata =

Scientific classification
- Kingdom: Animalia
- Phylum: Arthropoda
- Clade: Pancrustacea
- Class: Insecta
- Order: Lepidoptera
- Family: Gelechiidae
- Genus: Compsolechia
- Species: C. plumbeolata

Binomial name
- Compsolechia plumbeolata (Walsingham, 1897)

Synonyms
- Anacampsis plumbeolata Walsingham, 1897

Species of moth

Compsolechia plumbeolata is a moth of the family Gelechiidae. It was described by Thomas de Grey, 6th Baron Walsingham, in 1897. It is found in the West Indies, where it has been recorded from St. Croix and Puerto Rico.

The wingspan is about 10.5 mm. The forewings are shining, leaden grey, with five blackish spots, one on each side of the fold near its base, one resting on the middle of the fold, with another immediately above and slightly beyond it, the fifth at the end of the cell. A scarcely perceptible outwardly angulated paler band crosses the wing at one-fourth from the apex, terminating in a white spot at the commencement of the costal cilia, where a row of blackish spots extends around the apex and termen. The hindwings are brownish grey.
