= Compsolechia blepharopa =

Scientific classification
- Kingdom: Animalia
- Phylum: Arthropoda
- Clade: Pancrustacea
- Class: Insecta
- Order: Lepidoptera
- Family: Gelechiidae
- Genus: Compsolechia
- Species: C. blepharopa

Binomial name
- Compsolechia blepharopa (Meyrick, 1914)

Synonyms
- Anacampsis blepharopa Meyrick, 1914

Species of moth

Compsolechia blepharopa is a moth of the family Gelechiidae. It was described by Edward Meyrick in 1914. It is found in Guyana.

The wingspan is 12–14 mm. The forewings are blackish with lilac-grey markings, sometimes slightly whitish sprinkled, more or less marked with white on the costa. There is a narrow oblique subbasal fascia and moderate antemedian and postmedian fasciae converging towards the dorsum and confluent on the lower third, the second marked with a rather large round blackish spot outlined with white representing the second discal stigma. A patch of white irroration or suffusion is found on the apical portion of the costa and there is a separate semicircular patch of whitish irroration on the termen, which is more or less indicated, sometimes nearly obsolete. The hindwings are dark fuscous.
