= Compsolechia quadrifascia =

Scientific classification
- Kingdom: Animalia
- Phylum: Arthropoda
- Clade: Pancrustacea
- Class: Insecta
- Order: Lepidoptera
- Family: Gelechiidae
- Genus: Compsolechia
- Species: C. quadrifascia

Binomial name
- Compsolechia quadrifascia (Walker, 1864)

Synonyms
- Gelechia quadrifascia Walker, 1864; Gelechia superella Walker, 1864

Species of moth

Compsolechia quadrifascia is a moth of the family Gelechiidae. It was described by Francis Walker in 1864. It is found in Amazonas, Brazil.

Adults are dark cupreous, with a glaucous (green with bluish grey) tinge and the forewings with four oblique bands of the ground colour. The third band broader than the first and than the second. The fourth is slender and marginal.
