= Compsolechia sciomima =

Scientific classification
- Kingdom: Animalia
- Phylum: Arthropoda
- Clade: Pancrustacea
- Class: Insecta
- Order: Lepidoptera
- Family: Gelechiidae
- Genus: Compsolechia
- Species: C. sciomima

Binomial name
- Compsolechia sciomima Meyrick, 1922

Species of moth

Compsolechia sciomima is a moth of the family Gelechiidae. It was described by Edward Meyrick in 1922. It is found in Peru and Amazonas, Brazil.

The wingspan is 12–13 mm. The forewings are glossy dark violet-slaty grey with an obscure subterminal fascia of dark fuscous suffusion, broader in females and extending suffusedly to the termen. The hindwings are dark fuscous.
