= Compsolechia scopulata =

Scientific classification
- Kingdom: Animalia
- Phylum: Arthropoda
- Clade: Pancrustacea
- Class: Insecta
- Order: Lepidoptera
- Family: Gelechiidae
- Genus: Compsolechia
- Species: C. scopulata

Binomial name
- Compsolechia scopulata (Meyrick, 1914)

Synonyms
- Anacampsis scopulata Meyrick, 1914

Species of moth

Compsolechia scopulata is a moth of the family Gelechiidae. It was described by Edward Meyrick in 1914. It is found in Guyana and Brazil.

The wingspan is 12–13 mm (0.47–0.51 in). The forewings are pale greyish ochreous suffusedly mixed with grey and white, the costa suffused with white anteriorly. There is a large dark grey blotch extending along the dorsum from the base to two-thirds and reaching two-thirds across the wing, its edge irregularly projecting and margined with white, rounded off posteriorly. There is an oblique white strigula from the costa at two-thirds, followed by a triangular dark grey patch. Beyond this is a white costal spot, edged beneath by a black mark, from which a slightly curved narrow silvery-whitish-grey pre-marginal fascia runs to the tornus, cut by two black dashes towards the middle. The hindwings are dark fuscous, becoming blackish posteriorly.
