= Compsolechia recta =

Scientific classification
- Kingdom: Animalia
- Phylum: Arthropoda
- Clade: Pancrustacea
- Class: Insecta
- Order: Lepidoptera
- Family: Gelechiidae
- Genus: Compsolechia
- Species: C. recta

Binomial name
- Compsolechia recta Meyrick, 1922

Species of moth

Compsolechia recta is a moth of the family Gelechiidae. It was described by Edward Meyrick in 1922. It is found in Amazonas, Brazil.

The wingspan is about 10 mm. The forewings are fuscous, with the tips of the scales whitish, forming a very fine transverse striation. There are dark brown dots towards the costa near the base and at one-sixth and an oblique spot crossing the fold at one-fourth. The stigmata are dark brown, the discal approximated, the plical obliquely before the first discal. There is an indistinct dark brown streak from beneath and before the middle to the first discal. A gradually broader streak of blackish-brown suffusion is found along the costa from before the middle to the subterminal line, cut by an oblique white strigula from the costa beyond the middle and a fine almost straight whitish line is found from four-fifths of the costa to the tornus. There are also two short dark fuscous pre-marginal dashes above and below the apex. The hindwings are dark fuscous.
