= Compsolechia =

Scientific classification
- Kingdom: Animalia
- Phylum: Arthropoda
- Clade: Pancrustacea
- Class: Insecta
- Order: Lepidoptera
- Family: Gelechiidae
- Tribe: Anacampsini
- Genus: Compsolechia; Meyrick, 1918

Genus of moths

Compsolechia is a genus of moths in the family Gelechiidae.

== Species ==
- Compsolechia abolitella (Walker, 1864)
- Compsolechia abruptella (Walker, 1864)
- Compsolechia accinctella (Walker, 1864)
- Compsolechia acosmeta (Walsingham, 1910)
- Compsolechia aequilibris Meyrick, 1931
- Compsolechia amaurota (Meyrick, 1914)
- Compsolechia amazonica Meyrick, 1918
- Compsolechia ambusta (Walsingham, 1910)
- Compsolechia anthracura (Meyrick, 1914)
- Compsolechia antiplaca Meyrick, 1922
- Compsolechia argyracma Meyrick, 1922
- Compsolechia atmastra Meyrick, 1929
- Compsolechia balia (Walsingham, 1910)
- Compsolechia binotatella (Walker, 1864)
- Compsolechia blepharopa (Meyrick, 1914)
- Compsolechia camilotus Adamski, 2009
- Compsolechia campalea (Walsingham, 1910)
- Compsolechia canofusella (Walker, 1864)
- Compsolechia caryoterma Meyrick, 1922
- Compsolechia cassidata (Meyrick, 1914)
- Compsolechia chelidonia Meyrick, 1922
- Compsolechia chrysoplaca (Meyrick, 1912)
- Compsolechia cognatella (Walker, 1864)
- Compsolechia corymbas Meyrick, 1918
- Compsolechia crescentifasciella (Chambers, 1874)
- Compsolechia crocodilopa Meyrick, 1922
- Compsolechia desectella (Zeller, 1877)
- Compsolechia diazeucta Meyrick, 1918
- Compsolechia dicax (Meyrick, 1914)
- Compsolechia diplolychna Meyrick, 1922
- Compsolechia drachmaea Meyrick, 1922
- Compsolechia dryocrossa Meyrick, 1922
- Compsolechia elephas (Walsingham, 1910)
- Compsolechia epibola (Walsingham, 1910)
- Compsolechia erebodelta Meyrick, 1922
- Compsolechia eupecta (Meyrick, 1914)
- Compsolechia eurygypsa Meyrick, 1922
- Compsolechia fasciella (Felder & Rogenhofer, 1875)
- Compsolechia ferreata (Meyrick, 1914)
- Compsolechia glaphyra (Walsingham, 1910)
- Compsolechia halmyra (Meyrick, 1914)
- Compsolechia hemileucas Meyrick, 1922
- Compsolechia incurva (Meyrick, 1914)
- Compsolechia inusta (Meyrick, 1914)
- Compsolechia ischnoptera Meyrick, 1922
- Compsolechia leucorrhapta (Meyrick, 1914)
- Compsolechia lingulata Meyrick, 1918
- Compsolechia lithomorpha (Meyrick, 1914)
- Compsolechia loxogramma Meyrick, 1922
- Compsolechia mangelivora (Walsingham, 1897)
- Compsolechia melanophaea (Forbes, 1931)
- Compsolechia mesodelta Meyrick, 1922
- Compsolechia metadupa (Walsingham, 1910)
- Compsolechia mniocosma Meyrick, 1922
- Compsolechia molybdina (Walsingham, 1910)
- Compsolechia monochromella (Walker, 1864)
- Compsolechia neurophora Meyrick, 1922
- Compsolechia niobella (Felder & Rogenhofer, 1875)
- Compsolechia niphocentra Meyrick, 1922
- Compsolechia nuptella (Felder & Rogenhofer, 1875)
- Compsolechia ocelligera (Butler, 1883)
- Compsolechia orthophracta (Meyrick, 1914)
- Compsolechia parmata Meyrick, 1918
- Compsolechia peculella (Busck, 1914)
- Compsolechia pentastra Meyrick, 1922
- Compsolechia percnospila (Meyrick, 1914)
- Compsolechia perlatella (Walker, 1864)
- Compsolechia petromorpha Meyrick, 1922
- Compsolechia phaeotoxa Meyrick, 1922
- Compsolechia phepsalitis Meyrick, 1922
- Compsolechia picticornis (Walsingham, 1897)
- Compsolechia platiastis Meyrick, 1922
- Compsolechia plumbeolata (Walsingham, 1897)
- Compsolechia praenivea (Meyrick, 1914)
- Compsolechia ptochogramma Meyrick, 1922
- Compsolechia pungens Meyrick, 1922
- Compsolechia quadrifascia (Walker, 1864)
- Compsolechia recta Meyrick, 1922
- Compsolechia repandella (Walker, 1864)
- Compsolechia refracta (Meyrick, 1914)
- Compsolechia religata Meyrick, 1922
- Compsolechia rhombica Meyrick, 1922
- Compsolechia salebrosa Meyrick, 1918
- Compsolechia sciomima Meyrick, 1922
- Compsolechia scitella (Walker, 1864)
- Compsolechia scopulata (Meyrick, 1914)
- Compsolechia scutella (Zeller, 1877)
- Compsolechia secretella (Walker, 1864)
- Compsolechia seductella (Walker, 1864)
- Compsolechia sesamodes Meyrick, 1922
- Compsolechia siderophaea (Walsingham, 1910)
- Compsolechia solidella Walker, 1864
- Compsolechia sporozona (Meyrick, 1914)
- Compsolechia stasigastra Meyrick, 1922
- Compsolechia stelliferella (Walker, 1864)
- Compsolechia stillata Meyrick, 1922
- Compsolechia subapicalis (Walker, 1864)
- Compsolechia succincta (Walsingham, 1910)
- Compsolechia suffectella (Walker, 1864)
- Compsolechia superfusella (Walker, 1864)
- Compsolechia suspectella Walker, 1864
- Compsolechia tardella (Walker, 1864)
- Compsolechia terrenella (Busck, 1914)
- Compsolechia tetrortha Meyrick, 1922
- Compsolechia thysanora (Meyrick, 1914)
- Compsolechia titanota (Walsingham, 1910)
- Compsolechia trachycnemis Meyrick, 1922
- Compsolechia transjectella (Walker, 1864)
- Compsolechia trapezias Meyrick, 1922
- Compsolechia trochilea (Walsingham, 1910)
- Compsolechia versatella (Walker, 1864)
- Compsolechia vittatiella Adamski, 2009
- Compsolechia volubilis Meyrick, 1922
- Compsolechia zebrina (Walsingham, 1910)

== Status unclear ==
- Compsolechia apatelia (Durrant), described as Anacampsis apatelia [unavailable name]
- Compsolechia mutabilis (Walsingham), described as Anacampsis mutabilis [unavailable name]
