= Compsolechia terrenella =

Scientific classification
- Kingdom: Animalia
- Phylum: Arthropoda
- Clade: Pancrustacea
- Class: Insecta
- Order: Lepidoptera
- Family: Gelechiidae
- Genus: Compsolechia
- Species: C. terrenella

Binomial name
- Compsolechia terrenella (Busck, 1914)

Synonyms
- Anacampsis terrenella Busck, 1914

Species of moth

Compsolechia terrenella is a moth of the family Gelechiidae. It was described by August Busck in 1914. It is found in Panama.

The wingspan is about 16 mm. The forewings are light reddish brown with a violet sheen and sparsely dusted with black atoms. The extreme base of the costa, a small spot on the middle of the costa, and another at the apical third are black and there are two ill-defined small black dots on the middle of the cell and a similar one at the end of the cell. The entire tip and terminal cilia are black, while the dorsal cilia is ochreous. The hindwings are dark fuscous.
