= Compsolechia acosmeta =

Scientific classification
- Kingdom: Animalia
- Phylum: Arthropoda
- Clade: Pancrustacea
- Class: Insecta
- Order: Lepidoptera
- Family: Gelechiidae
- Genus: Compsolechia
- Species: C. acosmeta

Binomial name
- Compsolechia acosmeta (Walsingham, 1910)

Synonyms
- Anacampsis acosmeta Walsingham, 1910

Species of moth

Compsolechia acosmeta is a moth of the family Gelechiidae. It was described by Thomas de Grey, 6th Baron Walsingham, in 1910. It is found in Mexico (Sonora).

The wingspan is about 11 mm. The forewings are pale stone grey with minute sprinkling of tawny fuscous, especially across the apical fourth of the wing, at the commencement of which is a minute ochreous costal spot and another opposite to it on the dorsum, the latter encircled above by tawny fuscous scales. Along the termen are two or three minute groups of black scales. The hindwings are pale stone grey.
