= Compsolechia zebrina =

Scientific classification
- Kingdom: Animalia
- Phylum: Arthropoda
- Clade: Pancrustacea
- Class: Insecta
- Order: Lepidoptera
- Family: Gelechiidae
- Genus: Compsolechia
- Species: C. zebrina

Binomial name
- Compsolechia zebrina (Walsingham, 1910)

Synonyms
- Anacampsis zebrina Walsingham, 1910

Species of moth

Compsolechia zebrina is a moth of the family Gelechiidae. It was described by Walsingham in 1910. It is found in Mexico (Tabasco).

The wingspan is about 13 mm. The forewings are fuscous nearly to the middle, whitish ochreous blending into fawn-brown beyond. The basal portion is largely reticulated with whitish ochreous lines forming three larger and some smaller dark patches and on the outer third of the wing is a fuscous costal patch followed by an inwardly oblique whitish line, traceable to the dorsum, in an angulated series of whitish scales. An elongate whitish patch at the end of the cell between this and the apex. Above the patch is an elongate fuscous streak, and below it two fuscous lines following the nervules. Around the apex and termen a whitish ochreous line is followed throughout its course by a dark fuscous line at the base of the fawn-brown cilia. The hindwings are brownish fuscous.
