= Compsolechia diplolychna =

Scientific classification
- Kingdom: Animalia
- Phylum: Arthropoda
- Clade: Pancrustacea
- Class: Insecta
- Order: Lepidoptera
- Family: Gelechiidae
- Genus: Compsolechia
- Species: C. diplolychna

Binomial name
- Compsolechia diplolychna Meyrick, 1922

Species of moth

Compsolechia diplolychna is a moth of the family Gelechiidae. It was described by Edward Meyrick in 1922. It is found in Pará, Brazil.

The wingspan is about 16 mm. The forewings are purple blackish with a broad deep orange fascia at about two-thirds, leaving the costal edge dark fuscous. There are deep metallic-blue pointed streaks from its posterior edge near the extremities rather converging and not reaching the anterior edge. The hindwings are blackish, with a thinly scaled white blotch in the disc before the middle.
