= Compsolechia antiplaca =

Scientific classification
- Kingdom: Animalia
- Phylum: Arthropoda
- Clade: Pancrustacea
- Class: Insecta
- Order: Lepidoptera
- Family: Gelechiidae
- Genus: Compsolechia
- Species: C. antiplaca

Binomial name
- Compsolechia antiplaca Meyrick, 1922

Species of moth

Compsolechia antiplaca is a moth of the family Gelechiidae. It was described by Edward Meyrick in 1922. It is found in Peru and Amazonas, Brazil.

The wingspan is 12–14 mm. The forewings are dark grey, slightly whitish speckled and with two small blackish spots beneath the costa towards the base and one above the fold at one-fourth, often obsolete. There is a black spot beneath the fold at one-fifth, always present but variable in size. The stigmata are sometimes blackish, often obsolete, with the discal approximated, the plical rather before the first discal. Some dark fuscous suffusion is found on the costa before the subterminal line and there is a white line from three-fourths of the costa to the dorsum before the tornus, very obtusely angulated above the middle and somewhat interrupted above this, beyond the interruption a black oblong spot reaching the costa near the apex, the adjoining line immediately beneath this consists of an ochreous-white blotch not reaching the termen, crossed by two black dashes, rarely a third indicated above these. The hindwings are dark fuscous, in males with a slender greyish hair-pencil in the submedian fold.
