= Compsolechia ambusta =

Scientific classification
- Kingdom: Animalia
- Phylum: Arthropoda
- Clade: Pancrustacea
- Class: Insecta
- Order: Lepidoptera
- Family: Gelechiidae
- Genus: Compsolechia
- Species: C. ambusta

Binomial name
- Compsolechia ambusta (Walsingham, 1910)

Synonyms
- Anacampsis ambusta Walsingham, 1910; Anacampsis brochospila Meyrick, 1914

Species of moth

Compsolechia ambusta is a moth of the family Gelechiidae. It was described by Thomas de Grey, 6th Baron Walsingham, in 1910. It is found in Mexico, Brazil, Colombia and Peru.

The wingspan is about 10 mm. The forewings are dark brown, the basal portion much mottled with hoary white, forming a patch on the costa reaching to one-fourth. A white spot lies at the end of the cell and the dark brown ground-colour is somewhat abruptly terminated in a straight line across the wing from the commencement of the costal cilia, the apical portion being thence equally sprinkled with dark brown and hoary white, the latter forming a streak in the costal cilia. The apical and terminal cilia are reddish brown at their base, dark brown along their middle, and brownish cinereous at their outer ends. The hindwings are dark greyish brown, the cilia somewhat paler.
