= Compsolechia campalea =

Scientific classification
- Kingdom: Animalia
- Phylum: Arthropoda
- Clade: Pancrustacea
- Class: Insecta
- Order: Lepidoptera
- Family: Gelechiidae
- Genus: Compsolechia
- Species: C. campalea

Binomial name
- Compsolechia campalea (Walsingham, 1910)

Synonyms
- Anacampsis campalea Walsingham, 1910

Species of moth

Compsolechia campalea is a moth of the family Gelechiidae. It was described by Thomas de Grey, 6th Baron Walsingham, in 1910. It is found in Mexico (Guerrero).

The wingspan is about 15 mm. The forewings are stone-grey, with an upright, slightly oblique, dark chocolate dorsal patch near the base, preceded by two small spots of the same at the base, one costal, the other median. On the cell is a slight brownish spot at about half the wing-length, followed by a minute reduplicated spot at the end of the cell. A dark chocolate-brown patch at the apex is preceded by an oblique stone-white costal streak, traceable to the dorsum, but outwardly angulated on the middle where it sends out two slender branchlines towards the termen, ending in small brown spots. The hindwings are greyish brown.
