= Compsolechia lingulata =

Scientific classification
- Kingdom: Animalia
- Phylum: Arthropoda
- Clade: Pancrustacea
- Class: Insecta
- Order: Lepidoptera
- Family: Gelechiidae
- Genus: Compsolechia
- Species: C. lingulata

Binomial name
- Compsolechia lingulata Meyrick, 1918

Species of moth

Compsolechia lingulata is a moth of the family Gelechiidae. It was described by Edward Meyrick in 1918. It is found in Colombia and Guyana.

The wingspan is 9–10 mm (0.35–0.39 in). The forewings are light grey, towards the costa anteriorly suffused whitish and with a dark fuscous linear mark on the fold before the middle, and one in the disc beyond the middle, sometimes connected by dark grey suffusion. There is a suffused white longitudinal streak from the second to the termen just beneath the apex, near its anterior extremity expanded and including an oblique dark fuscous mark. A fine oblique white streak is found from the costa at two-thirds, reaching about halfway across the wing, edged by fine wedge-shaped blackish costal marks. The apical third of the wing is suffused with light ochreous brownish and there is a bent grey-whitish fascia irrorated (sprinkled) with black, the upper portion near the costal edge, the lower terminal. The hindwings are dark grey.
