= Compsolechia platiastis =

Scientific classification
- Kingdom: Animalia
- Phylum: Arthropoda
- Clade: Pancrustacea
- Class: Insecta
- Order: Lepidoptera
- Family: Gelechiidae
- Genus: Compsolechia
- Species: C. platiastis

Binomial name
- Compsolechia platiastis Meyrick, 1922

Species of moth

Compsolechia platiastis is a moth of the family Gelechiidae. It was described by Edward Meyrick in 1922. It is found in Amazonas, Brazil.

The wingspan is about 14 mm. The forewings are dark ashy grey. The plical and first discal stigma are indistinct, cloudy and dark fuscous, the plical rather anterior. There is a slender irregular grey line from four-fifths of the costa to the dorsum before the tornus, margined anteriorly by a broad dark fuscous fascia extending from the dorsum three-fourths across the wing, and posteriorly by a narrow entire fascia. There are two or three cloudy dark fuscous dots on the upper part of the termen. The hindwings are dark fuscous.
