= Compsolechia stasigastra =

Scientific classification
- Kingdom: Animalia
- Phylum: Arthropoda
- Clade: Pancrustacea
- Class: Insecta
- Order: Lepidoptera
- Family: Gelechiidae
- Genus: Compsolechia
- Species: C. stasigastra

Binomial name
- Compsolechia stasigastra Meyrick, 1922

Species of moth

Compsolechia stasigastra is a moth of the family Gelechiidae. It was described by Edward Meyrick in 1922. It is found in Amazonas, Brazil.

The wingspan is about 12 mm for males and 14 mm for females. The forewings are greyish ochreous or light fuscous, with veins 8-11 obscurely darker streaked and with small dark fuscous almost basal dots in the middle and on the dorsum, as well as a very oblique dark fuscous fasciate blotch from the dorsum at one-third reaching more than half way across the wing. There is an ill-defined blotch of fuscous suffusion occupying the dorsal half from near beyond this to the tornus, darkest posteriorly. A very faint small spot of whitish-ochreous suffusion is found on the costa at four-fifths and there are very indistinct small marginal dots of dark fuscous suffusion around the apex and termen. The hindwings of the males are grey, while those of the females are dark grey.
