= Compsolechia trochilea =

Scientific classification
- Kingdom: Animalia
- Phylum: Arthropoda
- Clade: Pancrustacea
- Class: Insecta
- Order: Lepidoptera
- Family: Gelechiidae
- Genus: Compsolechia
- Species: C. trochilea

Binomial name
- Compsolechia trochilea (Walsingham, 1910)

Synonyms
- Anacampsis trochilea Walsingham, 1910

Species of moth

Compsolechia trochilea is a moth of the family Gelechiidae. It was described by Thomas de Grey, 6th Baron Walsingham, in 1910. It is found in Mexico (Tabasco).

The wingspan is about 12 mm (0.47 in). The forewings are dark brownish fuscous, with a broad outwardly curved blue-green metallic band near the base, a slightly oblique stone-grey fascia across the middle, somewhat produced inwards on the dorsum, a triangular costal spot of the same colour between this and the metallic band, the termen, apex and cilia also stone-grey. The hindwings are brownish fuscous, with a dark fuscous spot at the flexus.
