= Compsolechia balia =

Scientific classification
- Kingdom: Animalia
- Phylum: Arthropoda
- Clade: Pancrustacea
- Class: Insecta
- Order: Lepidoptera
- Family: Gelechiidae
- Genus: Compsolechia
- Species: C. balia

Binomial name
- Compsolechia balia (Walsingham, 1910)

Synonyms
- Anacampsis balia Walsingham, 1910

Species of moth

Compsolechia balia is a moth of the family Gelechiidae. It was described by Thomas de Grey, 6th Baron Walsingham, in 1910. It is found in Mexico (Guerrero, Morelos).

The wingspan is about 17 mm. The forewings are leaden brownish, thickly and profusely sprinkled with pale cinereous scales leaving a very ill-defined and scarcely perceptible darker medio-costal spot, and a tornal shade diffused outward and upward, and a small spot above the middle of the termen. The hindwings are pale chocolate-brown.
