= Compsolechia titanota =

Scientific classification
- Kingdom: Animalia
- Phylum: Arthropoda
- Clade: Pancrustacea
- Class: Insecta
- Order: Lepidoptera
- Family: Gelechiidae
- Genus: Compsolechia
- Species: C. titanota

Binomial name
- Compsolechia titanota (Walsingham, 1910)

Synonyms
- Anacampsis titanota Walsingham, 1910

Species of moth

Compsolechia titanota is a moth of the family Gelechiidae. It was described by Thomas de Grey, 6th Baron Walsingham, in 1910. It is found in Guatemala.

The wingspan is about 13 mm. The forewings are ivory-white, the pale ground-colour fully exposed only along the costa from the base to two-thirds, and in a broad median band on which black shading and sprinkling of scales more or less encroaches from the base, and brownish fuscous shading, which covers the apical fourth, tends to encroach on its outer side. A small black dot at the extreme base of the costa is followed by two larger ones in the whitish space below the costa. Resting on the upper edge of the black suffusion an indistinct ocelloid spot lies at the end of the cell, and beyond it a slender whitish line passes somewhat obliquely through the brownish terminal suffusion from the costa to the tornus, with two or three small whitish length-streaks, combined with some black scales, running outward beyond it toward the termen and apex. There is a slender blackish line along the base of the tawny brown cilia. The hindwings are dark tawny brown.
