= Compsolechia superfusella =

Scientific classification
- Kingdom: Animalia
- Phylum: Arthropoda
- Clade: Pancrustacea
- Class: Insecta
- Order: Lepidoptera
- Family: Gelechiidae
- Genus: Compsolechia
- Species: C. superfusella

Binomial name
- Compsolechia superfusella (Walker, 1864)

Synonyms
- Gelechia superfusella Walker, 1864

Species of moth

Compsolechia superfusella is a moth of the family Gelechiidae. It was described by Francis Walker in 1864. It is found in Peru and Amazonas, Brazil.

Adults are fawn coloured, seen as a light yellow, tan hue. The forewings have a black stripe, which occupies half the breadth from the costa and more than half the length from the base, and is contiguous to two elongated white points in the disc. There is a curved submarginal white line composed of an oblique streak, which joins the costa, and of a few short longitudinal streaks, accompanied by two black points and by a glaucous (green with bluish grey) tinge. The marginal line is brown. The hindwings are dark cupreous brown.
