= Compsolechia binotatella =

Scientific classification
- Kingdom: Animalia
- Phylum: Arthropoda
- Clade: Pancrustacea
- Class: Insecta
- Order: Lepidoptera
- Family: Gelechiidae
- Genus: Compsolechia
- Species: C. binotatella

Binomial name
- Compsolechia binotatella (Walker, 1864)

Synonyms
- Gelechia binotatella Walker, 1864

Species of moth

Compsolechia binotatella is a moth of the family Gelechiidae. It was described by Francis Walker in 1864. It is found in Amazonas, Brazil.

Adults are cupreous brown, the forewings with two black points at the base and with a black spot in the disc near the base and a white transverse line at five-sixths of the length, traversed by an interrupted black streak, and forming an acute exterior angle, which emits a streak towards the border. There are a few slight white longitudinal submarginal streaks and a broad black streak along the tip of the costa.
