= Compsolechia dicax =

Scientific classification
- Kingdom: Animalia
- Phylum: Arthropoda
- Clade: Pancrustacea
- Class: Insecta
- Order: Lepidoptera
- Family: Gelechiidae
- Genus: Compsolechia
- Species: C. dicax

Binomial name
- Compsolechia dicax (Meyrick, 1914)

Synonyms
- Anacampsis dicax Meyrick, 1914

Species of moth

Compsolechia dicax is a moth of the family Gelechiidae. It was described by Edward Meyrick in 1914. It is found in Guyana and Peru.

The wingspan is about 15 mm. The forewings are light brownish with black subbasal dots on the costa and in the middle, as well as a flattened-triangular black blotch on the middle of the costa, reaching one-third of the way across the wing. The stigmata are hardly indicated. There is a small cloudy fuscous spot on the costa at three-fourths and a row of almost marginal dark fuscous dots around the posterior part of the costa and termen, as well as a row of fuscous marginal dots between these. The hindwings are dark fuscous.
