= Compsolechia amazonica =

Scientific classification
- Kingdom: Animalia
- Phylum: Arthropoda
- Clade: Pancrustacea
- Class: Insecta
- Order: Lepidoptera
- Family: Gelechiidae
- Genus: Compsolechia
- Species: C. amazonica

Binomial name
- Compsolechia amazonica Meyrick, 1918

Synonyms
- Gelechia suffusella Walker, 1864 (preocc.)

Species of moth

Compsolechia amazonica is a moth of the family Gelechiidae. It was described by Edward Meyrick in 1918. It is found in Amazonas, Brazil.
