= Compsolechia hemileucas =

Scientific classification
- Kingdom: Animalia
- Phylum: Arthropoda
- Clade: Pancrustacea
- Class: Insecta
- Order: Lepidoptera
- Family: Gelechiidae
- Genus: Compsolechia
- Species: C. hemileucas

Binomial name
- Compsolechia hemileucas Meyrick, 1922

Species of moth

Compsolechia hemileucas is a moth of the family Gelechiidae. It was described by Edward Meyrick in 1922. It is found in Amazonas, Brazil.

The wingspan is 14–15 mm. The forewings are dark violet grey with the markings suffused and blackish. There is a narrow basal fascia and a somewhat curved fascia at one-fifth, as well as a rather curved fascia from three-fifths of the costa to the middle of the dorsum, indistinct towards the margins. A broad streak is found from the disc at three-fifths to the termen beneath the apex. The hindwings are dark fuscous, in males with the basal half white, the edge suffused and irregular.
