= Compsolechia phepsalitis =

Scientific classification
- Kingdom: Animalia
- Phylum: Arthropoda
- Clade: Pancrustacea
- Class: Insecta
- Order: Lepidoptera
- Family: Gelechiidae
- Genus: Compsolechia
- Species: C. phepsalitis

Binomial name
- Compsolechia phepsalitis Meyrick, 1922

Species of moth

Compsolechia phepsalitis is a moth of the family Gelechiidae. It was described by Edward Meyrick in 1922. It is found in Amazonas, Brazil.

The wingspan is about 10 mm. The forewings are dark purplish grey, suffused with chestnut brown in the disc posteriorly and a dark fuscous median streak from near the base to two-fifths, expanded downwards into a blotch at one-fifth. The stigmata are cloudy and dark fuscous, the plical rather before the first discal, the second discal centred chestnut brown. There is an oblique white strigula from the costa at four-fifths, and two minute white dots above the tornus, as well as a roundish blackish spot resting on the costa near the apex, adjacent beneath this a moderate white dot and then a minute one. The hindwings are dark fuscous.
