= Compsolechia eupecta =

Scientific classification
- Kingdom: Animalia
- Phylum: Arthropoda
- Clade: Pancrustacea
- Class: Insecta
- Order: Lepidoptera
- Family: Gelechiidae
- Genus: Compsolechia
- Species: C. eupecta

Binomial name
- Compsolechia eupecta (Meyrick, 1914)

Synonyms
- Anacampsis eupecta Meyrick, 1914

Species of moth

Compsolechia eupecta is a moth of the family Gelechiidae. It was described by Edward Meyrick in 1914. It is found in Guyana and Brazil.

Compsolechia eupecta's wingspan is 12–13 mm. The forewings are grey with an indistinct dark fuscous dot in the disc at one-fourth. The moth's stigmata are small, indistinct and dark fuscous, the plical obliquely before the first discal. There is a grey-whitish slightly incurved subterminal line from four-fifths of the costa to the tornus, edged anteriorly by a narrow fascia of dark fuscous suffusion. There is also a series of blackish dots around the apical portion of the costa and termen. The hindwings are dark fuscous.
