= Compsolechia ischnoptera =

Scientific classification
- Kingdom: Animalia
- Phylum: Arthropoda
- Clade: Pancrustacea
- Class: Insecta
- Order: Lepidoptera
- Family: Gelechiidae
- Genus: Compsolechia
- Species: C. ischnoptera

Binomial name
- Compsolechia ischnoptera Meyrick, 1922

Species of moth

Compsolechia ischnoptera is a moth of the family Gelechiidae. It was described by Edward Meyrick in 1922. It is found in Pará, Brazil.

The wingspan is 9–10 mm. The forewings are dark violet grey with a whitish-ochreous apical patch, its edge running from five-sixths of the costa to the tornus, almost straight, enclosing five irregular dark grey pre-marginal dots. The hindwings are dark fuscous.
