= Compsolechia suffectella =

Scientific classification
- Kingdom: Animalia
- Phylum: Arthropoda
- Clade: Pancrustacea
- Class: Insecta
- Order: Lepidoptera
- Family: Gelechiidae
- Genus: Compsolechia
- Species: C. suffectella

Binomial name
- Compsolechia suffectella (Walker, 1864)

Synonyms
- Gelechia suffectella Walker, 1864

Species of moth

Compsolechia suffectella is a moth of the family Gelechiidae. It was described by Francis Walker in 1864. It is found in Mexico, Panama, Colombia and the Brazilian states of Amazonas and Espírito Santo.

The wingspan is 9–10 mm. The forewings are bright orange, with a short basal patch, a costal triangle, before the middle, reaching to the fold, and a large apical patch, all of these dark tawny fuscous, margined, except on the costa, by broken smaller patches of bright, shining steel-blue. A conspicuous patch of the same shining steel blue, edged with dark fuscous, lies in the centre of the triangular orange area, between the dark costal and apical patches. The hindwings are brownish fuscous.
