= Compsolechia tetrortha =

Scientific classification
- Kingdom: Animalia
- Phylum: Arthropoda
- Clade: Pancrustacea
- Class: Insecta
- Order: Lepidoptera
- Family: Gelechiidae
- Genus: Compsolechia
- Species: C. tetrortha

Binomial name
- Compsolechia tetrortha Meyrick, 1922

Species of moth

Compsolechia tetrortha is a moth of the family Gelechiidae. It was described by Edward Meyrick in 1922. It is found in Peru and Amazonas, Brazil.

The wingspan is about 12 mm. The forewings are grey, sometimes irregularly sprinkled with whitish and with cloudy blackish dots beneath the costa near the base and at one-fifth. There is an oblique blackish streak from near the dorsum at one-sixth crossing the fold. The stigmata are obscure, cloudy and blackish grey, the discal approximated, the plical rather before the first discal. There is a nearly straight fine whitish line from four-fifths of the costa to the tornus, preceded by a fascia of brownish suffusion (with slight pinkish tinge) expanded and becoming dark fuscous towards the costa. Between this and the termen, the ground colour is more or less ochreous or brownish, with four well-marked black dashes, the uppermost thickest, between and sometimes around these more or less whitish suffusion. The hindwings are dark fuscous and the submedian fold in males is filled with long grey hairs.
