= Compsolechia fasciella =

Scientific classification
- Kingdom: Animalia
- Phylum: Arthropoda
- Clade: Pancrustacea
- Class: Insecta
- Order: Lepidoptera
- Family: Gelechiidae
- Genus: Compsolechia
- Species: C. fasciella

Binomial name
- Compsolechia fasciella (C. Felder, R. Felder & Rogenhofer, 1875)

Synonyms
- Gelechia fasciella Felder & Rogenhofer, 1875

Species of moth

Compsolechia fasciella is a moth of the family Gelechiidae. It was described by Cajetan Felder, Rudolf Felder and Alois Friedrich Rogenhofer in 1875. It is found in Amazonas, Brazil.
