= Compsolechia neurophora =

Scientific classification
- Kingdom: Animalia
- Phylum: Arthropoda
- Clade: Pancrustacea
- Class: Insecta
- Order: Lepidoptera
- Family: Gelechiidae
- Genus: Compsolechia
- Species: C. neurophora

Binomial name
- Compsolechia neurophora Meyrick, 1922

Species of moth

Compsolechia neurophora is a moth of the family Gelechiidae. It was described by Edward Meyrick in 1922. It is found in Amazonas, Brazil.

The wingspan is 18–19 mm. The forewings are deep purple, more or less sprinkled with grey whitish, on the posterior fourth of the wing veins 3-7 are marked with light greyish streaks, while 2 and 8 are slightly indicated. The hindwings are dark fuscous.
