= Compsolechia erebodelta =

Scientific classification
- Kingdom: Animalia
- Phylum: Arthropoda
- Clade: Pancrustacea
- Class: Insecta
- Order: Lepidoptera
- Family: Gelechiidae
- Genus: Compsolechia
- Species: C. erebodelta

Binomial name
- Compsolechia erebodelta Meyrick, 1922

Species of moth

Compsolechia erebodelta is a moth of the family Gelechiidae. It was described by Edward Meyrick in 1922. It is found in Peru.

The wingspan is about 17 mm. The forewings are brownish, slightly speckled with whitish and with a blackish dot on the base of the costa and a rather irregular thick blackish transverse streak from the dorsum at one-fifth reaching two-thirds of the way across the wing. The costa is suffused with dark brown from the middle to three-fourths. There is a fine indistinct ochreous-whitish line from three-fourths of the costa to the dorsum before the tornus, angulated in the middle, both halves incurved. A subtriangular black spot is found on the costa before the apex and there are two small black dots before the upper part of the termen, connected with the subterminal line by very fine ochreous-whitish dashes. The hindwings are dark grey.
