= Compsolechia atmastra =

Scientific classification
- Kingdom: Animalia
- Phylum: Arthropoda
- Clade: Pancrustacea
- Class: Insecta
- Order: Lepidoptera
- Family: Gelechiidae
- Genus: Compsolechia
- Species: C. atmastra

Binomial name
- Compsolechia atmastra Meyrick, 1929

Species of moth

Compsolechia atmastra is a moth of the family Gelechiidae. It was described by Edward Meyrick in 1929. It is found in Peru.

The wingspan is about 15 mm.
