= Compsolechia caryoterma =

Scientific classification
- Kingdom: Animalia
- Phylum: Arthropoda
- Clade: Pancrustacea
- Class: Insecta
- Order: Lepidoptera
- Family: Gelechiidae
- Genus: Compsolechia
- Species: C. caryoterma

Binomial name
- Compsolechia caryoterma Meyrick, 1922

Species of moth

Compsolechia caryoterma is a moth of the family Gelechiidae. It was described by Edward Meyrick in 1922. It is found in Amazonas, Brazil.

The wingspan is about 12 mm. The forewings are dark violet grey, irregularly sprinkled with whitish and with a black subcostal streak from the base to one-fourth, terminated by a white costal spot and the costal area above it suffused white. There is an obscure streak of dark fuscous suffusion from the base of the dorsum to the disc at one-third, as well as a broad irregular dark fuscous fascia from before the middle of the costa to two-thirds of the dorsum, in males partially suffused brown in the disc. In males, the veins on the posterior half are purplish, and the costa is brown from the middle to three-fourths. There is an irregular variably interrupted white line from three-fourths of the costa to the tornus and a brown marginal streak around the posterior part of the costa and termen, tending to be toothed on the veins, and preceded by some whitish interneural dots, which are more developed in males. The hindwings are dark fuscous.
