= Compsolechia chrysoplaca =

Scientific classification
- Kingdom: Animalia
- Phylum: Arthropoda
- Clade: Pancrustacea
- Class: Insecta
- Order: Lepidoptera
- Family: Gelechiidae
- Genus: Compsolechia
- Species: C. chrysoplaca

Binomial name
- Compsolechia chrysoplaca (Meyrick, 1912)

Synonyms
- Anacampsis chrysoplaca Meyrick, 1912

Species of moth

Compsolechia chrysoplaca is a moth of the family Gelechiidae. It was described by Edward Meyrick in 1912. It is found in Venezuela.

The wingspan is about 18 mm. The forewings are dark fuscous irrorated (sprinkled) with ochreous whitish and with a round orange apical patch with a projection along the termen, edged with blackish except on a small whitish spot on the costa, and enclosing an elongate golden-metallic spot. The hindwings are dark fuscous.
