= Compsolechia trachycnemis =

Scientific classification
- Kingdom: Animalia
- Phylum: Arthropoda
- Clade: Pancrustacea
- Class: Insecta
- Order: Lepidoptera
- Family: Gelechiidae
- Genus: Compsolechia
- Species: C. trachycnemis

Binomial name
- Compsolechia trachycnemis Meyrick, 1922

Species of moth

Compsolechia trachycnemis is a moth of the family Gelechiidae. It was described by Edward Meyrick in 1922. It is found in Peru.

The wingspan is 14–16 mm. The forewings are ochreous grey, at the dorsal two-fifths, a median streak to the termen beneath the apex with a branch to the dorsum before the tornus, a streak beneath the costa from the middle to the apex, and sometimes the dorsal area, suffused ochreous whitish. There is an irregular blackish mark from the costa at the base and a transverse blackish fascia from the dorsum at one-fifth not reaching the costa. An almost blackish pre-marginal dot is found above the apex and two below the apex, preceded by whitish linear marks. The hindwings are dark fuscous, in males with an expansible greyish hair-pencil lying in the anterior half of the submedian groove.
