= Compsolechia cognatella =

Scientific classification
- Kingdom: Animalia
- Phylum: Arthropoda
- Clade: Pancrustacea
- Class: Insecta
- Order: Lepidoptera
- Family: Gelechiidae
- Genus: Compsolechia
- Species: C. cognatella

Binomial name
- Compsolechia cognatella (Walker, 1864)

Synonyms
- Gelechia cognatella Walker, 1864

Species of moth

Compsolechia cognatella is a moth of the family Gelechiidae. It was described by Francis Walker in 1864. It is found in Amazonas, Brazil.

Adults are silvery white, the forewings dark cinereous (ash gray) beneath, except the fringe, which is slightly tipped with ochraceous. The hindwings are cinereous beneath along the costa and at the tips.
