= Compsolechia abolitella =

Scientific classification
- Kingdom: Animalia
- Phylum: Arthropoda
- Clade: Pancrustacea
- Class: Insecta
- Order: Lepidoptera
- Family: Gelechiidae
- Genus: Compsolechia
- Species: C. abolitella

Binomial name
- Compsolechia abolitella (Walker, 1864)

Synonyms
- Gelechia abolitella Walker, 1864

Species of moth

Compsolechia abolitella is a moth of the family Gelechiidae. It was described by Francis Walker in 1864. It was described from Australia.

Adults are dark cupreous, cinereous (ash grey) beneath, with cinereous hindwings.
