= Compsolechia refracta =

Scientific classification
- Kingdom: Animalia
- Phylum: Arthropoda
- Clade: Pancrustacea
- Class: Insecta
- Order: Lepidoptera
- Family: Gelechiidae
- Genus: Compsolechia
- Species: C. refracta

Binomial name
- Compsolechia refracta (Meyrick, 1914)

Synonyms
- Anacampsis refracta Meyrick, 1914

Species of moth

Compsolechia refracta is a moth of the family Gelechiidae. It was described by Edward Meyrick in 1914. It is found in Guyana, Peru and Brazil.

The wingspan is 12–13 mm. The forewings are dark brown with four very obscure violet-fuscous direct transverse fasciae, the first moderate and subbasal, the second broad and antemedian, the third very broad and postmedian and the fourth from four-fifths of the costa to the tornus, sometimes slightly incurved, narrow and posteriorly suffused. There is a small obscure spot of ground colour in the third representing the second discal stigma. The hindwings are dark fuscous.
