= Compsolechia solidella =

Scientific classification
- Kingdom: Animalia
- Phylum: Arthropoda
- Clade: Pancrustacea
- Class: Insecta
- Order: Lepidoptera
- Family: Gelechiidae
- Genus: Compsolechia
- Species: C. solidella

Binomial name
- Compsolechia solidella (Walker, 1864)

Synonyms
- Gelechia solidella Walker, 1864

Species of moth

Compsolechia solidella is a moth of the family Gelechiidae. It was described by Francis Walker in 1864. It is found in Amazonas, Brazil.

Adults are cupreous ferruginous, silvery cinereous (ash gray) beneath, the forewings with a diffuse silvery-cinereous subcostal streak, and with a transverse submarginal patch of the same hue. This patch is bordered on the outer side by a denticulated white line, beyond which the wing is rather paler, and contains a deep black subapical dot and some deep black elongate white-marked submarginal points. The marginal line is dark ferruginous. The hindwings are dark brown.
