= Compsolechia trapezias =

Scientific classification
- Kingdom: Animalia
- Phylum: Arthropoda
- Clade: Pancrustacea
- Class: Insecta
- Order: Lepidoptera
- Family: Gelechiidae
- Genus: Compsolechia
- Species: C. trapezias

Binomial name
- Compsolechia trapezias Meyrick, 1922

Species of moth

Compsolechia trapezias is a moth of the family Gelechiidae. It was described by Edward Meyrick in 1922. It is found in Brazil.

The wingspan is about 14 mm (0.55 in). The forewings are brownish ochreous with a faint pinkish tinge, whitish sprinkled in the disc, around the subterminal line more rosy ochreous. There is a black median dot at the base and an oblique blackish fasciate streak from the dorsum at one-fifth, the apex curved over posteriorly and pointed. The costal edge is blackish just before the subterminal line and there is a very oblique white mark on the costa at three-fifths and an interrupted angulated line on the lower three-fifths of the wing to the dorsum before the tornus, cut by a strong black dash in the middle running to near the termen. Immediately beyond this is a rhomboidal black costal blotch extending to near the apex. There are also some white pre-terminal scales on the edges of the black dash, a minute white dot above and another below it. The hindwings are dark fuscous.
