= Compsolechia corymbas =

Scientific classification
- Kingdom: Animalia
- Phylum: Arthropoda
- Clade: Pancrustacea
- Class: Insecta
- Order: Lepidoptera
- Family: Gelechiidae
- Genus: Compsolechia
- Species: C. corymbas

Binomial name
- Compsolechia corymbas Meyrick, 1918

Species of moth

Compsolechia corymbas is a moth of the family Gelechiidae. It was described by Edward Meyrick in 1918. It is found in Guyana.

The wingspan is about 12 mm. The forewings are rather dark grey with the markings dark bronzy fuscous suffused with black. There is an irregular-oval patch extending over the dorsum from the base to near the middle, and nearly reaching the costa near the base, edged above with a whitish line continued to connect with the anterior angle of the median blotch. Suffused elongate spots are found on the costa before the middle and at two-thirds, the latter followed by an inwardly oblique whitish mark. There is an irregular blotch in the middle of the disc and a small elongate spot indicating the second discal stigma. A small whitish mark is found on the dorsum just before the tornus, preceded by dark suffusion and a suffused dark blotch occupies the apical area. The hindwings are dark grey, whitish and thinly scaled in the disc towards the base.
