= Compsolechia aequilibris =

Scientific classification
- Kingdom: Animalia
- Phylum: Arthropoda
- Clade: Pancrustacea
- Class: Insecta
- Order: Lepidoptera
- Family: Gelechiidae
- Genus: Compsolechia
- Species: C. aequilibris

Binomial name
- Compsolechia aequilibris Meyrick, 1931

Species of moth

Compsolechia aequilibris is a moth of the family Gelechiidae. It was described by Edward Meyrick in 1931. It is found in Brazil.

The wingspan is about 17 mm. The hindwings are dark grey.
