= Compsolechia seductella =

Scientific classification
- Kingdom: Animalia
- Phylum: Arthropoda
- Clade: Pancrustacea
- Class: Insecta
- Order: Lepidoptera
- Family: Gelechiidae
- Genus: Compsolechia
- Species: C. seductella

Binomial name
- Compsolechia seductella (Walker, 1864)

Synonyms
- Gelechia seductella Walker, 1864

Species of moth

Compsolechia seductella is a moth in the family Gelechiidae. It was first described by Francis Walker in 1864. It is found in Amazonas, Brazil.

Adults are fawn-colored. The forewings feature a few elongated black spots near the base and several black streaks of varying sizes across the disc. A curved white exterior line, composed of small points, runs along the wing, except near the costa, where it becomes continuous and retracted. There are also a few exterior white streaks, accompanied by three deep black streaks. The marginal line is pale fawn-colored. The hindwings are copper-brown.

Hostplants: This species feeds on Miconia sp. and Clidemia sp., including Clidemia hirta.
