= Compsolechia percnospila =

Scientific classification
- Kingdom: Animalia
- Phylum: Arthropoda
- Clade: Pancrustacea
- Class: Insecta
- Order: Lepidoptera
- Family: Gelechiidae
- Genus: Compsolechia
- Species: C. percnospila

Binomial name
- Compsolechia percnospila (Meyrick, 1914)

Synonyms
- Anacampsis percnospila Meyrick, 1914

Species of moth

Compsolechia percnospila is a moth of the family Gelechiidae. It was described by Edward Meyrick in 1914. It is found in Guyana.

The wingspan is about 17 mm. The forewings are pale brownish, with scattered blackish scales tending to form strigulae and with the costal edge whitish ochreous, with black spots at the base, the middle, and three-fourths, and the anterior half dotted with black. The stigmata are blackish, with the discal approximated, the plical somewhat before the first discal. There is a moderate blackish terminal fascia, its edge convex, irregular, terminating in the tornus. The hindwings are dark grey.
