= Compsolechia nuptella =

Scientific classification
- Kingdom: Animalia
- Phylum: Arthropoda
- Clade: Pancrustacea
- Class: Insecta
- Order: Lepidoptera
- Family: Gelechiidae
- Genus: Compsolechia
- Species: C. nuptella

Binomial name
- Compsolechia nuptella (C. Felder, R. Felder & Rogenhofer, 1875)

Synonyms
- Gelechia nuptella Felder & Rogenhofer, 1875; Compsolechia scholias Meyrick, 1922

Species of moth

Compsolechia nuptella is a moth of the family Gelechiidae. It was described by Cajetan Felder, Rudolf Felder and Alois Friedrich Rogenhofer in 1875. It is found in Peru and Amazonas, Brazil.

The wingspan is about 14 mm. The forewings are dark grey, posteriorly purple tinged and with a black subcostal streak from the base to one-fourth, terminated by a suffused white spot. There is an indistinct dark fuscous streak from the dorsum near the base to the disc at one-third, some whitish suffusion about the fold beyond this. A blackish elongate blotch is found on the middle of the costa, where an oblique blackish streak runs to and surrounds a white mark in the disc at three-fifths. There is also a blackish streak along the posterior half of the fold, preceded by a small spot of white suffusion, at the tornus meeting a suberect dark fuscous spot. An irregular white line is found from three-fourths of the costa to the tornus, stronger on the costa, somewhat interrupted in the middle and there are several small whitish pre-marginal dots around the apex. The hindwings are dark fuscous.
