= Compsolechia halmyra =

Scientific classification
- Kingdom: Animalia
- Phylum: Arthropoda
- Clade: Pancrustacea
- Class: Insecta
- Order: Lepidoptera
- Family: Gelechiidae
- Genus: Compsolechia
- Species: C. halmyra

Binomial name
- Compsolechia halmyra (Meyrick, 1914)

Synonyms
- Anacampsis halmyra Meyrick, 1914

Species of moth

Compsolechia halmyra is a moth of the family Gelechiidae. It was described by Edward Meyrick in 1914. It is found in Guyana and Brazil.

The wingspan is 12–13 mm. The forewings are dark grey, more or less variably sprinkled or mixed with white on the anterior half and with small black subcostal and subdorsal spots at the base and a thick oblique black streak from one-fifth of the dorsum to the disc, the apex sometimes expanded. There are two blackish dots towards the costa above this. The stigmata are moderate and blackish, the discal approximated, the plical rather before the first discal. There is a fine white slightly interrupted subterminal line from four-fifths of the costa to the tornus, slightly sinuate inwards towards the costa, preceded by a dark fuscous fascia. A black wedge-shaped longitudinal mark rests on the costa near the apex, and two black dashes are found towards the upper part of the termen, between these markings are some indistinct suffused whitish dashes. The hindwings are dark fuscous with the submedian fold in males filled with long hairs.
