= Compsolechia praenivea =

Scientific classification
- Kingdom: Animalia
- Phylum: Arthropoda
- Clade: Pancrustacea
- Class: Insecta
- Order: Lepidoptera
- Family: Gelechiidae
- Genus: Compsolechia
- Species: C. praenivea

Binomial name
- Compsolechia praenivea (Meyrick, 1914)

Synonyms
- Anacampsis praenivea Meyrick, 1914

Species of moth

Compsolechia praenivea is a moth of the family Gelechiidae. It was described by Edward Meyrick in 1914. It is found in Guyana.

The wingspan is 12–13 mm. The forewings are blackish with a little-marked narrow oblique subbasal fascia, indicated by some white scales or greyish suffusion. There are undefined broad antemedian and postmedian fasciae of white irroration (sprinkles), converging towards the dorsum and confluent on the lower portion, the first more strongly suffused with white anteriorly on the costal half, the plical and second discal stigmata represented on these by obscure small blackish spots. There is a well-marked white transverse line at five-sixths parallel to the termen, sinuate inwards towards the costa and dorsum, curved outwards on the median portion. The terminal area beyond this is sprinkled with white. The hindwings are dark fuscous.
