= Compsolechia ptochogramma =

Scientific classification
- Kingdom: Animalia
- Phylum: Arthropoda
- Clade: Pancrustacea
- Class: Insecta
- Order: Lepidoptera
- Family: Gelechiidae
- Genus: Compsolechia
- Species: C. ptochogramma

Binomial name
- Compsolechia ptochogramma Meyrick, 1922

Species of moth

Compsolechia ptochogramma is a moth of the family Gelechiidae. It was described by Edward Meyrick in 1922. It is found in Pará, Brazil.

The wingspan is about 10 mm. The forewings are grey, more or less irrorated (sprinkled) with whitish on an oblique area from the middle of the costa to the tornus. There are black dots towards the costa at the base and one-sixth and a thick very oblique black streak from the dorsum at one-sixth crossing more than half the wing. The stigmata are small, indistinct and dark fuscous, the discal approximated, the plical obliquely before the first discal. There is a patch of dark fuscous suffusion on the costa preceding the subterminal line, this is represented by a white dot on the costa at three-fourths, and a transverse series of several minute whitish dots beyond it on the lower half of the wing. Immediately beyond this is a triangular blackish costal blotch, adjoining which beneath is a white blotch not reaching the margin crossed by two black dashes. The hindwings are dark fuscous with a short slender grey hair-pencil in the submedian fold.
