= Compsolechia elephas =

Scientific classification
- Kingdom: Animalia
- Phylum: Arthropoda
- Clade: Pancrustacea
- Class: Insecta
- Order: Lepidoptera
- Family: Gelechiidae
- Genus: Compsolechia
- Species: C. elephas

Binomial name
- Compsolechia elephas (Walsingham, 1910)

Synonyms
- Anacampsis elephas Walsingham, 1910

Species of moth

Compsolechia elephas is a moth of the family Gelechiidae. It was described by Thomas de Grey, 6th Baron Walsingham, in 1910. It is found in Mexico (Guerrero) and Guatemala.

The wingspan is about 15 mm. The forewings are leaden grey, with a black dot at the extreme base of the costa and a brownish fuscous shade-band crossing the wing at two-thirds, its inner edge somewhat produced along the costa, its outer margin marked by an angular whitish line, bent inward below the costa, outward to the middle of the wing, and thence obliquely inward to the dorsum where it terminates in a small buff-brown spot, a few brownish scales are scattered along its outer edge. Around the apex and termen is a series of somewhat diffused brownish fuscous spots. The hindwings are pale greyish brown.
