= Compsolechia subapicalis =

Scientific classification
- Kingdom: Animalia
- Phylum: Arthropoda
- Clade: Pancrustacea
- Class: Insecta
- Order: Lepidoptera
- Family: Gelechiidae
- Genus: Compsolechia
- Species: C. subapicalis

Binomial name
- Compsolechia subapicalis (Walker, 1864)

Synonyms
- Gelechia subapicalis Walker, 1864

Species of moth

Compsolechia subapicalis is a moth of the family Gelechiidae. It was described by Francis Walker in 1864. It is found in Peru and Amazonas, Brazil.

Adults are dark cupreous brown, white beneath, the forewings have a light cupreous marginal space, in which there are two transverse lines of elongated white points. These lines are approximate hindward, the points of the second are much larger than those of the first, and are accompanied by three deep black streaks.
