= Compsolechia niobella =

Scientific classification
- Kingdom: Animalia
- Phylum: Arthropoda
- Clade: Pancrustacea
- Class: Insecta
- Order: Lepidoptera
- Family: Gelechiidae
- Genus: Compsolechia
- Species: C. niobella

Binomial name
- Compsolechia niobella (C. Felder, R. Felder & Rogenhofer, 1875)

Synonyms
- Gelechia niobella Felder & Rogenhofer, 1875; Compsolechia tornoptila Meyrick, 1922

Species of moth

Compsolechia niobella is a moth of the family Gelechiidae. It was described by Cajetan Felder, Rudolf Felder and Alois Friedrich Rogenhofer in 1875. It is found in Amazonas, Brazil.

The wingspan is about 18 mm (0.71 in). The forewings are grey with an oblique streak of brown suffusion from the dorsum towards the base reaching two-thirds across the wing. The discal and dorsal areas are suffused brownish from one-third to near the termen, a suffused dark brown streak from the disc at one-third to the termen beneath the apex, below this a paler area posteriorly, brown streaks on veins 8-11 except towards the costa. The hindwings are dark grey, paler towards the base.
