= Compsolechia versatella =

Scientific classification
- Kingdom: Animalia
- Phylum: Arthropoda
- Clade: Pancrustacea
- Class: Insecta
- Order: Lepidoptera
- Family: Gelechiidae
- Genus: Compsolechia
- Species: C. versatella

Binomial name
- Compsolechia versatella (Walker, 1864)

Synonyms
- Gelechia versatella Walker, 1864

Species of moth

Compsolechia versatella is a moth of the family Gelechiidae. It was described by Francis Walker in 1864. It is found in Peru and Amazonas, Brazil.

Adults are fawn coloured, the forewings with several various black streaks, of which one on the exterior part of the costa is larger than the others. There is a broad abbreviated transverse submarginal white line, intersected by two short slender longitudinal black lines. The hindwings are dark brown.
