= Compsolechia perlatella =

Scientific classification
- Kingdom: Animalia
- Phylum: Arthropoda
- Clade: Pancrustacea
- Class: Insecta
- Order: Lepidoptera
- Family: Gelechiidae
- Genus: Compsolechia
- Species: C. perlatella

Binomial name
- Compsolechia perlatella (Walker, 1864)

Synonyms
- Gelechia perlatella Walker, 1864; Gelechia smaragdulella Walker, 1864; Gelechia secundella Walker, 1864

Species of moth

Compsolechia perlatella is a moth of the family Gelechiidae. It was described by Francis Walker in 1864. It is found in Amazonas, Brazil.

Adults are dark cupreous, the forewings with two oblique aeneous-cinereous (bronze-ash-gray) bands, one near the base, the other in the middle.
