= Compsolechia amaurota =

Scientific classification
- Kingdom: Animalia
- Phylum: Arthropoda
- Clade: Pancrustacea
- Class: Insecta
- Order: Lepidoptera
- Family: Gelechiidae
- Genus: Compsolechia
- Species: C. amaurota

Binomial name
- Compsolechia amaurota (Meyrick, 1914)

Synonyms
- Anacampsis amaurota Meyrick, 1914

Species of moth

Compsolechia amaurota is a moth of the family Gelechiidae. It was described by Edward Meyrick in 1914. It is found in Guyana.

The wingspan is 16–17 mm. The forewings are dark fuscous, somewhat sprinkled with white on the anterior half and with black basal dots on the costa and dorsum and in the middle. There is a moderate oblique fasciaform blackish spot from one-fifth of the dorsum reaching two-thirds across the wing. The stigmata are hardly darker, the discal approximated, the plical rather obliquely before the first discal. There is some blackish-fuscous suffusion towards the costa from the middle to the subterminal line and a fine white slightly curved subterminal line from three-fourths of the costa, becoming irregular and broken in the disc and not reaching the tornus. An elongate black spot is found beneath the costa before the apex, with a very short white dash beneath this, and two black dashes towards the upper part of the termen, edged with a few white scales posteriorly. The hindwings are dark fuscous, the submedian fold in males forming a deep pale fuscous groove, its margins clothed with short hairs.
