= Compsolechia lithomorpha =

Scientific classification
- Kingdom: Animalia
- Phylum: Arthropoda
- Clade: Pancrustacea
- Class: Insecta
- Order: Lepidoptera
- Family: Gelechiidae
- Genus: Compsolechia
- Species: C. lithomorpha

Binomial name
- Compsolechia lithomorpha (Meyrick, 1914)

Synonyms
- Anacampsis lithomorpha Meyrick, 1914

Species of moth

Compsolechia lithomorpha is a moth of the family Gelechiidae. It was described by Edward Meyrick in 1914. It is found in Guyana, Brazil and Peru.

The wingspan is 13–15 mm. The forewings are glossy dark violet slaty grey. The hindwings are dark fuscous, in males sometimes thinly scaled in the disc towards the base.
