= Compsolechia crocodilopa =

Scientific classification
- Kingdom: Animalia
- Phylum: Arthropoda
- Clade: Pancrustacea
- Class: Insecta
- Order: Lepidoptera
- Family: Gelechiidae
- Genus: Compsolechia
- Species: C. crocodilopa

Binomial name
- Compsolechia crocodilopa Meyrick, 1922

Species of moth

Compsolechia crocodilopa is a moth of the family Gelechiidae. It was described by Edward Meyrick in 1922. It is found in Peru and Pará, Brazil.

The wingspan is 11–12 mm. The forewings are dark fuscous with the base narrowly suffused with yellow ochreous and with a moderate fascia of ground colour at one-fourth enclosed by two yellow-ochreous lines, the anterior edge subconcave, the posterior straight, the space between this and the base and a broad fascia beyond it shining leaden metallic. There is an 8-shaped transverse space at four-fifths mostly occupied by two shining blue-leaden-metallic spots and enclosed by two irregular transverse yellow-ochreous suffused streaks, the first bearing a dark fuscous transverse mark in the middle, the second interrupted in the middle, these tending to be connected on the costa by yellow-ochreous suffusion, sometimes cut by a projection from upper metallic spot towards the apex and there is a blue-leaden-metallic terminal streak. The hindwings are dark fuscous.
