= Compsolechia siderophaea =

Scientific classification
- Kingdom: Animalia
- Phylum: Arthropoda
- Clade: Pancrustacea
- Class: Insecta
- Order: Lepidoptera
- Family: Gelechiidae
- Genus: Compsolechia
- Species: C. siderophaea

Binomial name
- Compsolechia siderophaea (Walsingham, 1910)

Synonyms
- Anacampsis siderophaea Walsingham, 1910

Species of moth

Compsolechia siderophaea is a moth of the family Gelechiidae. It was described by Thomas de Grey, 6th Baron Walsingham, in 1910. It is found in Mexico (Vera Cruz, Tabasco).

The wingspan is 11–15 mm. The forewings are greyish cinereous, profusely sprinkled throughout with whitish cinereous scales, leaving an ill-defined triangular umber-brown costal spot beyond the middle, with a shade of the same colour on the outer portion of the fold, and a straight umber-brown terminal band including the apex, preceded on the costa by an obscure pale ochreous spot. The hindwings are dark umber-brown.
