= Compsolechia secretella =

Scientific classification
- Kingdom: Animalia
- Phylum: Arthropoda
- Clade: Pancrustacea
- Class: Insecta
- Order: Lepidoptera
- Family: Gelechiidae
- Genus: Compsolechia
- Species: C. secretella

Binomial name
- Compsolechia secretella (Walker, 1864)

Synonyms
- Gelechia secretella Walker, 1864; Gelechia plejadella Felder & Rogenhofer, 1875; Anacampsis cistulata Meyrick, 1914; Anacampsis trimolybda Meyrick, 1914

Species of moth

Compsolechia secretella is a moth of the family Gelechiidae. It was described by Francis Walker in 1864. It is found in Guyana, Peru and Amazonas, Brazil.

The wingspan is 12–14 mm. The forewings are blackish with three blue-leaden fasciae, the first moderate and basal, the second and third broad, enclosing a triangular median costal blotch and confluent on the lower half, extending on the dorsum from one-fourth to near the tornus, sometimes partially whitish sprinkled. There is a similar hardly curved shade from four-fifths of the costa to the tornus, white on the costa, almost confluent with the third fascia. A blue-leaden sometimes whitish-sprinkled streak is found along the termen. The hindwings are dark fuscous.
