= Compsolechia scitella =

Scientific classification
- Kingdom: Animalia
- Phylum: Arthropoda
- Clade: Pancrustacea
- Class: Insecta
- Order: Lepidoptera
- Family: Gelechiidae
- Genus: Compsolechia
- Species: C. scitella

Binomial name
- Compsolechia scitella (Walker, 1864)

Synonyms
- Gelechia scitella Walker, 1864

Species of moth

Compsolechia scitella is a moth of the family Gelechiidae. It was described by Francis Walker in 1864. It is found in Amazonas in Brazil and in Peru.

Adults are dark cupreous, the forewings with a broad exterior ochraceous band, which is much rounded on its outer side and contains an acutely angular black streak. A whitish transverse slightly denticulated line is found near the outer side of the band and there are a few black and white longitudinal streaks between the line and the exterior border, which is very oblique. The hindwings have a white costa along half the length from the base.
