= Compsolechia mangelivora =

Scientific classification
- Kingdom: Animalia
- Phylum: Arthropoda
- Clade: Pancrustacea
- Class: Insecta
- Order: Lepidoptera
- Family: Gelechiidae
- Genus: Compsolechia
- Species: C. mangelivora

Binomial name
- Compsolechia mangelivora (Walsingham, 1897)

Synonyms
- Anacampsis mangelivora Walsingham, 1897

Species of moth

Compsolechia mangelivora is a moth of the family Gelechiidae. It was described by Thomas de Grey, 6th Baron Walsingham, in 1897. It is found in the West Indies, where it has been recorded from St. Thomas and Puerto Rico.

The wingspan is about 14 mm. The forewings are greyish fuscous, with profuse hoary speckling and a dark fuscous elongate spot on the costa before the middle, which is preceded and followed by some hoary whitish scaling, of which there is also a slight patch at the commencement of the costal cilia. The hindwings are brownish grey.

The larvae feed on Rhizophora mangel.
