= Compsolechia ferreata =

Scientific classification
- Kingdom: Animalia
- Phylum: Arthropoda
- Clade: Pancrustacea
- Class: Insecta
- Order: Lepidoptera
- Family: Gelechiidae
- Genus: Compsolechia
- Species: C. ferreata

Binomial name
- Compsolechia ferreata (Meyrick, 1914)

Synonyms
- Anacampsis ferreata Meyrick, 1914

Species of moth

Compsolechia ferreata is a moth of the family Gelechiidae. It was described by Edward Meyrick in 1914. It is found in Guyana.

The wingspan is 14–16 mm. The forewings are dark indigo-blue leaden with a slender rather oblique suffused blackish fascia at one-fourth, sometimes almost obsolete. The stigmata are obscure and blackish, with the plical somewhat before the first discal. There is also a narrow blackish subterminal fascia nearly parallel to the termen and a blackish streak along the termen. The hindwings are dark fuscous.
