= Compsolechia peculella =

Scientific classification
- Kingdom: Animalia
- Phylum: Arthropoda
- Clade: Pancrustacea
- Class: Insecta
- Order: Lepidoptera
- Family: Gelechiidae
- Genus: Compsolechia
- Species: C. peculella

Binomial name
- Compsolechia peculella (Busck, 1914)

Synonyms
- Anacampsis peculella Busck, 1914

Species of moth

Compsolechia peculella is a moth of the family Gelechiidae. It was described by August Busck in 1914. It is found in Panama.

The wingspan is 11–12 mm. The forewings are white but so strongly and evenly overlaid with dark brown scales as to be obscured, except under magnification. Near the base is a broad, outwardly oblique, dark brown costal streak, reaching beyond the fold and on the middle of the costa is a large, triangular spot, reaching to the lower edge of the cell. There is a small, moon-shaped, dark brown spot at the end of the cell and just before the termen and parallel with it is a broad, dark brown fascia, and between it and the discal spot is a narrower, less pronounced and slightly convex, dark brown fascia. The hindwings are dark brownish fuscous.
