= Compsolechia cassidata =

Scientific classification
- Kingdom: Animalia
- Phylum: Arthropoda
- Clade: Pancrustacea
- Class: Insecta
- Order: Lepidoptera
- Family: Gelechiidae
- Genus: Compsolechia
- Species: C. cassidata

Binomial name
- Compsolechia cassidata (Meyrick, 1914)

Synonyms
- Anacampsis cassidata Meyrick, 1914

Species of moth

Compsolechia cassidata is a moth of the family Gelechiidae. It was described by Edward Meyrick in 1914. It is found in Guyana and Brazil.

The wingspan is about 16 mm. The forewings are dark violet-leaden grey with the base slenderly dark fuscous and with a dark fuscous transverse streak at one-sixth and a suffused dark fuscous streak from the fold at two-fifths of the wing slightly upcurved to the costa beyond the middle. A suffused dark fuscous streak is found from the disc beyond the middle to the costa just above the apex. The hindwings are dark fuscous.
