= Compsolechia epibola =

Scientific classification
- Kingdom: Animalia
- Phylum: Arthropoda
- Clade: Pancrustacea
- Class: Insecta
- Order: Lepidoptera
- Family: Gelechiidae
- Genus: Compsolechia
- Species: C. epibola

Binomial name
- Compsolechia epibola (Walsingham, 1910)

Synonyms
- Anacampsis epibola Walsingham, 1910

Species of moth

Compsolechia epibola is a moth of the family Gelechiidae. It was described by Thomas de Grey, 6th Baron Walsingham, in 1910. It is found in Mexico (Vera Cruz) and Panama.

The wingspan is about 18 mm. The forewings are ashy grey, with sparsely scattered greyish fuscous speckling, the usual spots are not more noticeable than other specks. An externally oblique greyish fuscous shade rises to a little above the fold towards the base of the dorsum. A slight clouding of the same colour appears at the commencement of the costal and dorsal cilia respectively, the anteterminal portion of the wing beyond it being slightly paler than the general hue. The hindwings are greyish brown.
