= Compsolechia glaphyra =

Scientific classification
- Kingdom: Animalia
- Phylum: Arthropoda
- Clade: Pancrustacea
- Class: Insecta
- Order: Lepidoptera
- Family: Gelechiidae
- Genus: Compsolechia
- Species: C. glaphyra

Binomial name
- Compsolechia glaphyra (Walsingham, 1910)

Synonyms
- Anacampsis glaphyra Walsingham, 1910

Species of moth

Compsolechia glaphyra is a moth of the family Gelechiidae. It was described by Walsingham in 1910. It is found in Mexico (Vera Cruz).

The wingspan is about 12 mm. The forewings are olivaceous leaden grey, with a fuscous dot close to the base of the cell, a slightly oblique dorsal streak at about one-sixth, extending across the fold, brownish fuscous, margined on either side with rich ferruginous scales. An obscure dot in the fold beyond its middle is followed by a discal dot above it, and another at the end of the cell. A rich ferruginous band crosses the wing at the commencement of the cilia, its upper and lower extremities shaded obliquely inward with dark brown. There is a series of small fuscous spots around the termen and apex at the base of the glaucous cilia, which are tipped with pale cinereous. The hindwings are dark brown.
