= Compsolechia religata =

Scientific classification
- Kingdom: Animalia
- Phylum: Arthropoda
- Clade: Pancrustacea
- Class: Insecta
- Order: Lepidoptera
- Family: Gelechiidae
- Genus: Compsolechia
- Species: C. religata

Binomial name
- Compsolechia religata Meyrick, 1922

Species of moth

Compsolechia religata is a moth of the family Gelechiidae. It was described by Edward Meyrick in 1922. It is found in Peru.

The wingspan is about 10 mm. The forewings are dark grey, becoming blackish grey posteriorly. There is an obscure grey-whitish shade from the costa at four-fifths to the tornus, obtusely indented above the middle. The hindwings are dark fuscous.
