= Compsolechia ocelligera =

Scientific classification
- Kingdom: Animalia
- Phylum: Arthropoda
- Clade: Pancrustacea
- Class: Insecta
- Order: Lepidoptera
- Family: Gelechiidae
- Genus: Compsolechia
- Species: C. ocelligera

Binomial name
- Compsolechia ocelligera (Butler, 1883)

Synonyms
- Gelechia ocelligera Butler, 1883

Species of moth

Compsolechia ocelligera is a moth of the family Gelechiidae. It was described by Arthur Gardiner Butler in 1883. It is found in Chile.
