= Compsolechia repandella =

Scientific classification
- Kingdom: Animalia
- Phylum: Arthropoda
- Clade: Pancrustacea
- Class: Insecta
- Order: Lepidoptera
- Family: Gelechiidae
- Genus: Compsolechia
- Species: C. repandella

Binomial name
- Compsolechia repandella (Walker, 1864)

Synonyms
- Gelechia repandella Walker, 1864; Anacampsis diortha Meyrick, 1914; Anacampsis episema Walsingham, 1910; Gelechia subsriptella Walker, 1864

Species of moth

Compsolechia repandella is a moth of the family Gelechiidae. It was described by Francis Walker in 1864. It is found in Mexico, Colombia, southern Brazil (Parana, Amazonas) and Guyana.

The wingspan is 12–14 mm. The forewings are grey, sometimes more or less sprinkled with black and white and with a black spot beneath the costa near the base. There is an oblique blackish streak from one-fifth of the dorsum reaching half across the wing. The stigmata are moderate, cloudy and blackish, the discal approximated, the plical obliquely before the first discal. There is a fine white nearly straight more or less interrupted subterminal line from four-fifths of the costa to the tornus, preceded by a deep brown fascia becoming blackish on the costa. Between this and the termen is a transverse whitish sometimes bluish-tinged blotch crossed by two black dashes and surmounted by a small elongate black spot. The hindwings are dark fuscous, the submedian fold in males filled with long hairs.
