= Compsolechia stillata =

Scientific classification
- Kingdom: Animalia
- Phylum: Arthropoda
- Clade: Pancrustacea
- Class: Insecta
- Order: Lepidoptera
- Family: Gelechiidae
- Genus: Compsolechia
- Species: C. stillata

Binomial name
- Compsolechia stillata Meyrick, 1922

Species of moth

Compsolechia stillata is a moth of the family Gelechiidae. It was described by Edward Meyrick in 1922. It is found in Peru and Amazonas, Brazil.

The wingspan is 11–12 mm. The forewings are iridescent light brownish ochreous, more or less irregularly mixed with or wholly suffused with grey except for the apical area, and sprinkled with dark fuscous. There are some irregular small spots of dark fuscous suffusion anteriorly, and the stigmata are sometimes similarly indicated, the plical somewhat before the first discal. The costal edge is more or less suffused with dark fuscous, sometimes more broadly towards the subterminal line. There is an irregular tornal blotch of dark fuscous suffusion and an obtusely angulated series of small irregular whitish dots from three-fourths of the costa to the tornus. A short pre-marginal white dash is found before the apex, with a black dash above it and two below it. The hindwings are dark fuscous, in males with a large expansible grey hair-pencil lying in the submedian groove.
