= Compsolechia volubilis =

Scientific classification
- Kingdom: Animalia
- Phylum: Arthropoda
- Clade: Pancrustacea
- Class: Insecta
- Order: Lepidoptera
- Family: Gelechiidae
- Genus: Compsolechia
- Species: C. volubilis

Binomial name
- Compsolechia volubilis Meyrick, 1922

Species of moth

Compsolechia volubilis is a moth of the family Gelechiidae. It was described by Edward Meyrick in 1922. It is found in Peru.

The wingspan is about 11 mm. The forewings are dark grey, more or less irregularly irrorated (sprinkled) with whitish and with two small black spots towards the costa near the base, and a black mark above the base of the dorsum. An oblique black blotch crosses the fold at one-fourth. The stigmata are blackish, with the discal approximated, the plical rather before the first discal. There is a well-defined whitish line from three-fourths of the costa to the dorsum before the tornus, sinuate inwards on the upper half, preceded by broad blackish suffusion on the costa and sometimes throughout, or in one specimen by a brownish tinge in the disc. The apical area is irregularly mixed whitish, towards the costa tinged brownish, a wedge-shaped black mark resting on the costa near the apex, two black dashes reaching the margin beneath the apex. The hindwings are dark fuscous, in males with a rather short expansible grey hair-pencil lying in a grey-whitish patch in the submedian groove.
