= Compsolechia canofusella =

Scientific classification
- Kingdom: Animalia
- Phylum: Arthropoda
- Clade: Pancrustacea
- Class: Insecta
- Order: Lepidoptera
- Family: Gelechiidae
- Genus: Compsolechia
- Species: C. canofusella

Binomial name
- Compsolechia canofusella (Walker, 1864)

Synonyms
- Gelechia canofusella Walker, 1864

Species of moth

Compsolechia canofusella is a moth of the family Gelechiidae. It was described by Francis Walker in 1864. It is found in Amazonas, Brazil.

Adults are black, the forewings with a submarginal band which is not chalybeous (steel blue), but includes a zigzag chalybeous line. The exterior border is almost straight and slightly oblique. The hindwings are dark cupreous.
