= Compsolechia salebrosa =

Scientific classification
- Kingdom: Animalia
- Phylum: Arthropoda
- Clade: Pancrustacea
- Class: Insecta
- Order: Lepidoptera
- Family: Gelechiidae
- Genus: Compsolechia
- Species: C. salebrosa

Binomial name
- Compsolechia salebrosa Meyrick, 1918

Species of moth

Compsolechia salebrosa is a moth in the family Gelechiidae. It was described by Edward Meyrick in 1918. It is found on the Galápagos Islands and in Colombia and Guyana.

The wingspan is 9–10 mm (0.35–0.39 in). The forewings are whitish, more or less sprinkled or irrorated with grey, especially on the dorsal two-thirds. The costal edge is blackish anteriorly, with a fine oblique black strigula at one-fourth, and an elongate black spot in the middle. There are indistinct dark fuscous dots obliquely placed above and below the fold at one-fourth. The stigmata are indistinct and dark fuscous, the plical obliquely before the first discal. There is sometimes some irregular light brownish suffusion in the disc and a transverse white line is found from four-fifths of the costa to the tornus, angularly indented outwards in the middle, edged on the costa on both sides with small blackish spots, and preceded by a slender light brownish fascia. There is a light brownish line around the posterior part of the costa and termen, marked with black on the termen. The hindwings are grey.
