= Compsolechia pungens =

Scientific classification
- Kingdom: Animalia
- Phylum: Arthropoda
- Clade: Pancrustacea
- Class: Insecta
- Order: Lepidoptera
- Family: Gelechiidae
- Genus: Compsolechia
- Species: C. pungens

Binomial name
- Compsolechia pungens Meyrick, 1922

Species of moth

Compsolechia pungens is a moth of the family Gelechiidae. It was described by Edward Meyrick in 1922. It is found in Peru.

The wingspan is 16–18 mm. The forewings are fuscous, slightly speckled with whitish with a very oblique thick streak of dark brown suffusion from the dorsum at one-fourth reaching more than half way across the wing, limiting a basal patch of ochieous-brown suffusion not reaching the costa and edged above by a small cloudy spot of dark fuscous suffusion at the base, and an indistinct slender very oblique streak from the costa near the base to its posterior extremity. A small obscurely darker spot is found in the middle of the disc and there is some brown suffusion along the median area of the costa, terminated by a suffused dark brown spot preceding the subterminal line. There is a fine whitish line from three-fourths of the costa to the dorsum before the tornus, angulated in the middle, the upper half incurved, the lower straight or slightly dentate beneath the angle, with a short dash projecting from the angle towards a short black pre-terminal dash. The apical area is light brownish, with a thick ochreous-brown marginal streak around the posterior part of the costa and termen, an oval black spot lying in this above the apex. The hindwings are dark grey.
