= Compsolechia rhombica =

Scientific classification
- Kingdom: Animalia
- Phylum: Arthropoda
- Clade: Pancrustacea
- Class: Insecta
- Order: Lepidoptera
- Family: Gelechiidae
- Genus: Compsolechia
- Species: C. rhombica

Binomial name
- Compsolechia rhombica Meyrick, 1922

Species of moth

Compsolechia rhombica is a moth of the family Gelechiidae. It was described by Edward Meyrick in 1922. It is found in Peru.

The wingspan is about 14 mm. The forewings are grey suffused with whitish, beyond a line from before the middle of the costa to three-fourths of the dorsum ochreous brown, two whitish spots obliquely placed in the disc on the division. There is a black dot on the base of the costa and a thick blackish very oblique curved streak from the dorsum near the base to the disc near the middle, with the apex pointed. The costal edge just before the subterminal line is blackish and there is a fine whitish line from three-fifths of the costa to the dorsum before the tornus, acutely angulated in the middle, both halves slightly incurved, the angle cut by a fine blackish line from beyond the middle of the disc to the termen. Immediately beyond this is a rhomboidal blackish spot on the costa extending nearly to the apex and there are also short white pre-terminal markings edging a black subapical line, another above this and two below them. The hindwings are dark fuscous.
