= Compsolechia argyracma =

Scientific classification
- Kingdom: Animalia
- Phylum: Arthropoda
- Clade: Pancrustacea
- Class: Insecta
- Order: Lepidoptera
- Family: Gelechiidae
- Genus: Compsolechia
- Species: C. argyracma

Binomial name
- Compsolechia argyracma Meyrick, 1922

Species of moth

Compsolechia argyracma is a moth of the family Gelechiidae. It was described by Edward Meyrick in 1922. It is found in Pará, Brazil.

The wingspan is about 11 mm. The forewings are dark bronzy fuscous with the base and more than the dorsal half suffused with violet blue, an irregular oblique blue streak from the costa at one-fourth running into it, the edge of the blue portion irregularly prominent beyond the middle. There is a fine angulated blue subterminal line, tinged with silvery whitish on the dorsal area and there is a shining silvery-whitish apical spot preceded by blue suffusion. The hindwings are dark grey.
