= Compsolechia parmata =

Scientific classification
- Kingdom: Animalia
- Phylum: Arthropoda
- Clade: Pancrustacea
- Class: Insecta
- Order: Lepidoptera
- Family: Gelechiidae
- Genus: Compsolechia
- Species: C. parmata

Binomial name
- Compsolechia parmata Meyrick, 1918

Species of moth

Compsolechia parmata is a moth of the family Gelechiidae. It was described by Edward Meyrick in 1918. It is found in Colombia.

The wingspan is about 17 mm. The forewings are dark ash grey with a rounded black blotch extending on the costa from one-fifth to the middle and reaching two-thirds of the way across the wing, edged with some scattered ochreous-whitish scales. There is a similarly edged subtriangular black spot in the disc at two-thirds and an ochreous-white dot on the costa at three-fourths. The hindwings are grey.
