= Compsolechia thysanora =

Scientific classification
- Kingdom: Animalia
- Phylum: Arthropoda
- Clade: Pancrustacea
- Class: Insecta
- Order: Lepidoptera
- Family: Gelechiidae
- Genus: Compsolechia
- Species: C. thysanora

Binomial name
- Compsolechia thysanora (Meyrick, 1914)

Synonyms
- Anacampsis thysanora Meyrick, 1914

Species of moth

Compsolechia thysanora is a moth of the family Gelechiidae. It was described by Edward Meyrick in 1914. It is found in Peru.

The wingspan is 17–18 mm. The forewings are glossy dark leaden grey, sometimes whitish sprinkled in the disc and with black subbasal dots in the middle and on the dorsum. There are cloudy blackish dots obliquely placed above and below the fold at one-fifth of the wing. The stigmata are obscurely darker, partially edged with some whitish scales and there is an obscure obtusely curved-angulated subterminal line of whitish irroration (sprinkles) from a white dot on the costa at four-fifths to the tornus, preceded by irregular white irroration tending to form longitudinal marks, and followed by a round suffused black spot towards the costa, and three large dots towards the termen. The terminal area is purplish tinged. The hindwings are dark fuscous with a downwards-directed fringe of long pale ochreous hairscales beneath the costa from the base to beyond the middle, more yellowish posteriorly.
