= Compsolechia drachmaea =

Scientific classification
- Kingdom: Animalia
- Phylum: Arthropoda
- Clade: Pancrustacea
- Class: Insecta
- Order: Lepidoptera
- Family: Gelechiidae
- Genus: Compsolechia
- Species: C. drachmaea

Binomial name
- Compsolechia drachmaea Meyrick, 1922

Species of moth

Compsolechia drachmaea is a moth of the family Gelechiidae. It was described by Edward Meyrick in 1922. It is found in Amazonas, Brazil.

The wingspan is 17–18 mm. The forewings are rather dark violet grey, slightly whitish speckled with the dorsal area suffused blackish from near the base to near the tornus and with a fine rather irregular hardly curved whitish line from beyond three-fourths of the costa to the dorsum before the tornus, a minute whitish dash beyond this in the middle. The apical area is dark brown, with a round black spot resting on the costa near the apex, adjoining this beneath is a large white dot, a blackish pre-terminal dot beneath the apex with small adjacent white dots above and beneath and two other white dots beneath it, but these four white dots sometimes obsolete. The hindwings are dark fuscous.
