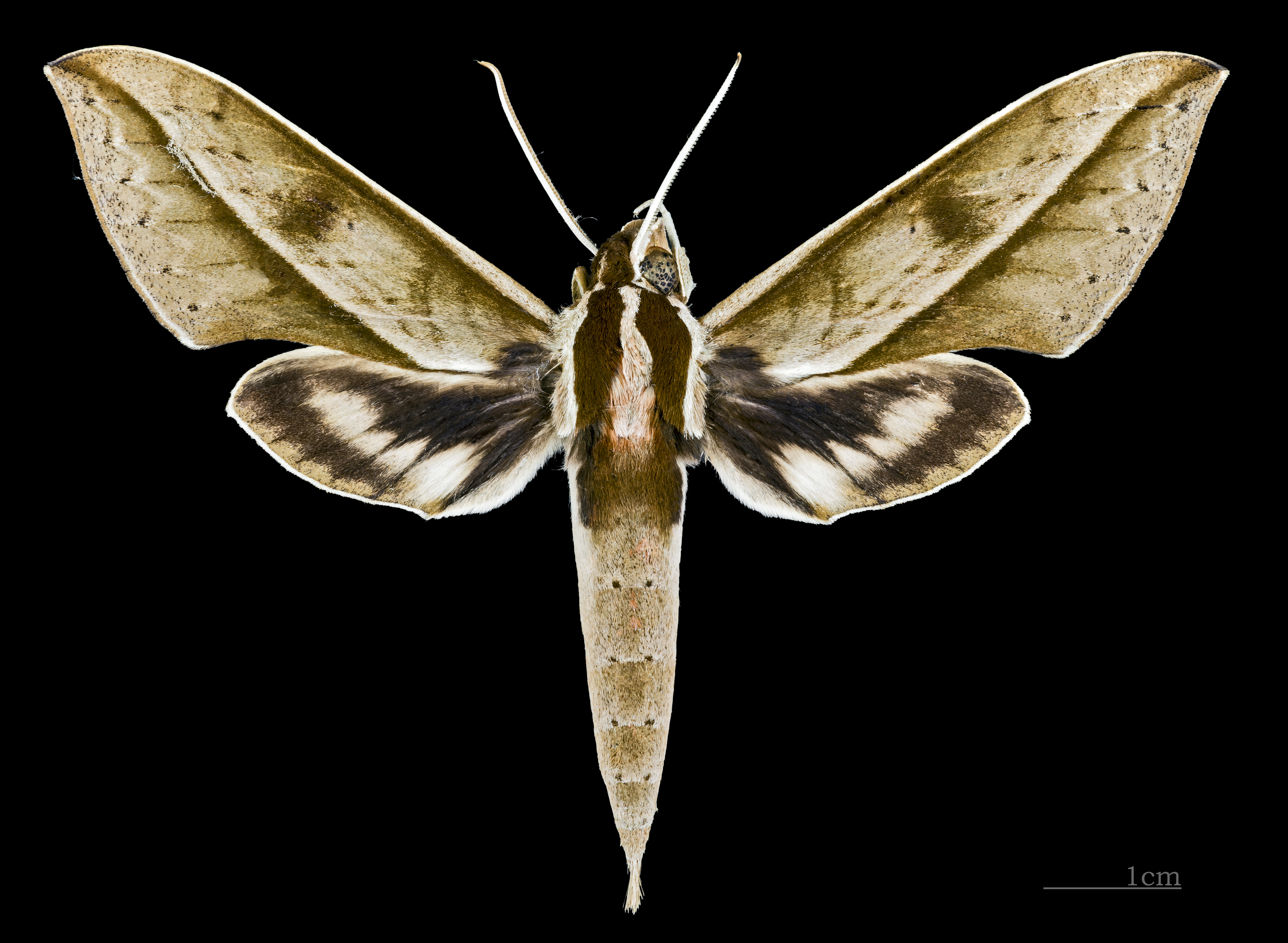
- Xylophanes meridanus - MHNT Dorsal
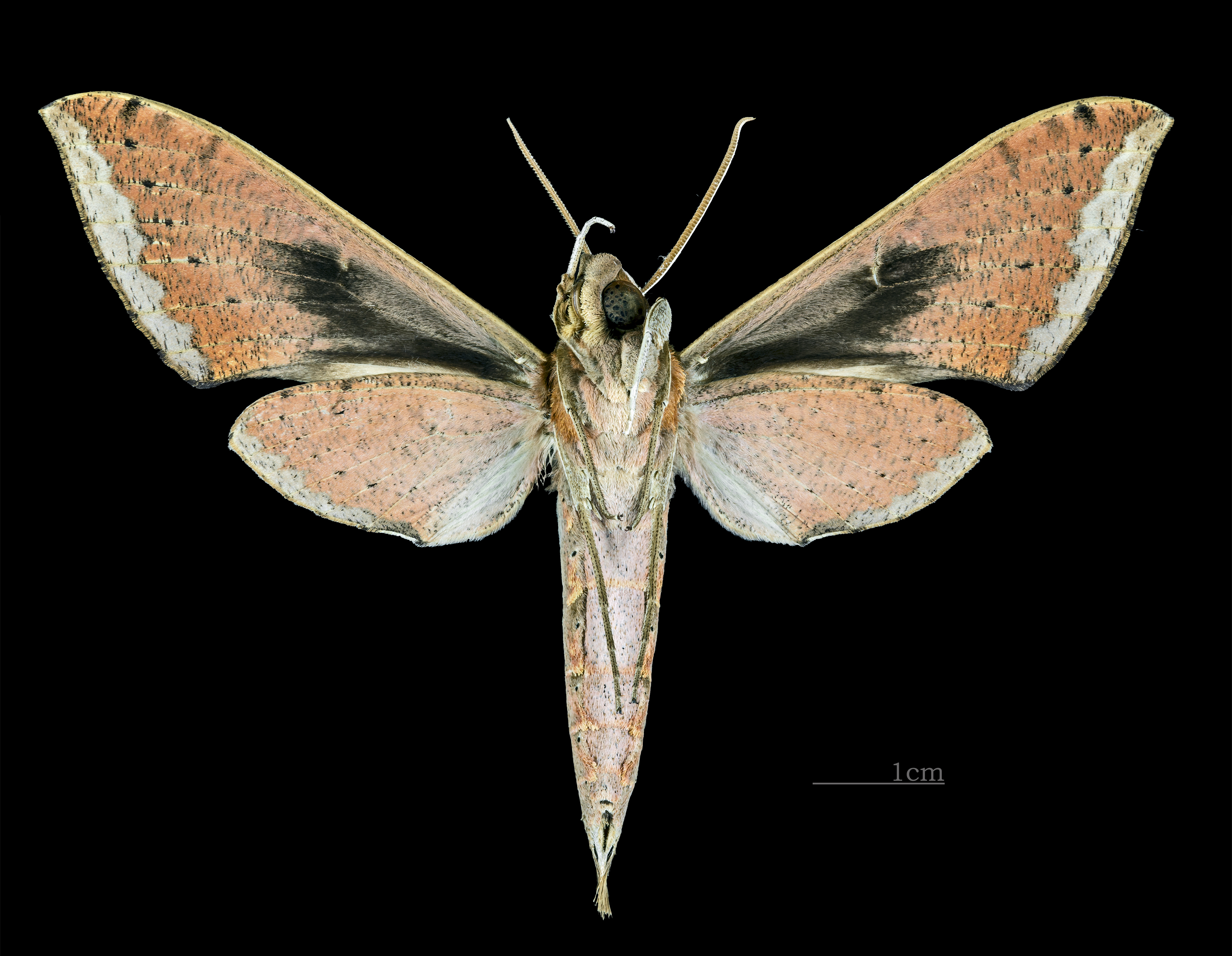
- Xylophanes meridanus - MHNT Ventral

Scientific classification
- Domain: Eukaryota
- Kingdom: Animalia
- Phylum: Arthropoda
- Class: Insecta
- Order: Lepidoptera
- Family: Sphingidae
- Genus: Xylophanes
- Species: X. meridanus

Binomial name
- Xylophanes meridanus Rothschild & Jordan, 1910

= Xylophanes meridanus =

Species of moth

Xylophanes meridanus is a moth of the family Sphingidae. It is known from Suriname.

It is similar to Xylophanes amadis, but the pale median band is always interrupted by black streaks along the veins, particularly those of the posterior part of the wing.

The larvae possibly feed on Psychotria panamensis, Psychotria nervosa and Pavonia guanacastensis.
