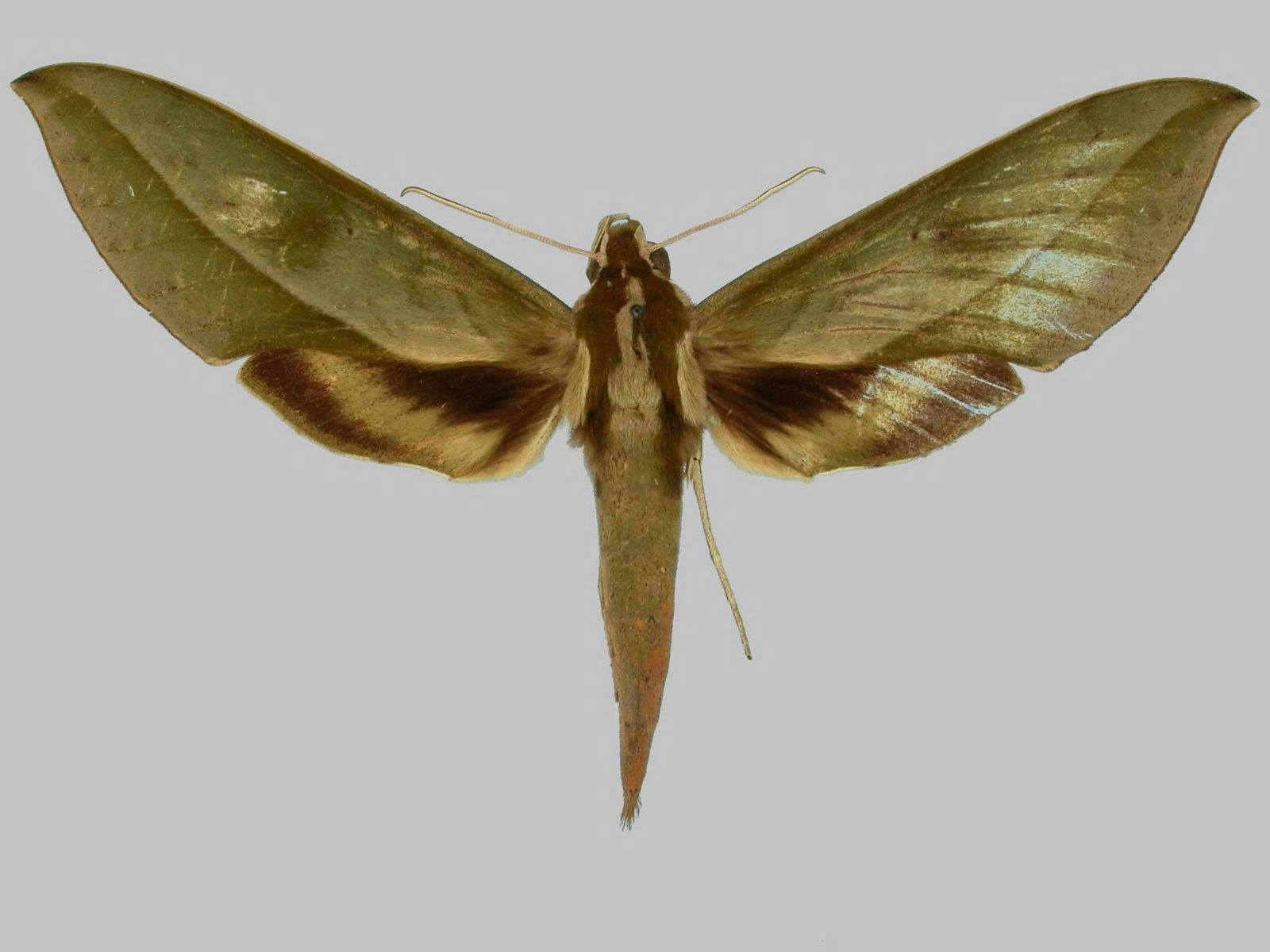
- Upper side view of a female Xylophanes staudingeri

Scientific classification
- Domain: Eukaryota
- Kingdom: Animalia
- Phylum: Arthropoda
- Class: Insecta
- Order: Lepidoptera
- Family: Sphingidae
- Genus: Xylophanes
- Species: X. staudingeri

Binomial name
- Xylophanes staudingeri (Rothschild, 1894)

Synonyms
- Theretra staudingeri Rothschild, 1894

= Xylophanes staudingeri =

Species of moth

Xylophanes staudingeri is a moth of the family Sphingidae. It is known from Panama, Guatemala and Nicaragua.

It is similar to Xylophanes cyrene but deep green.
