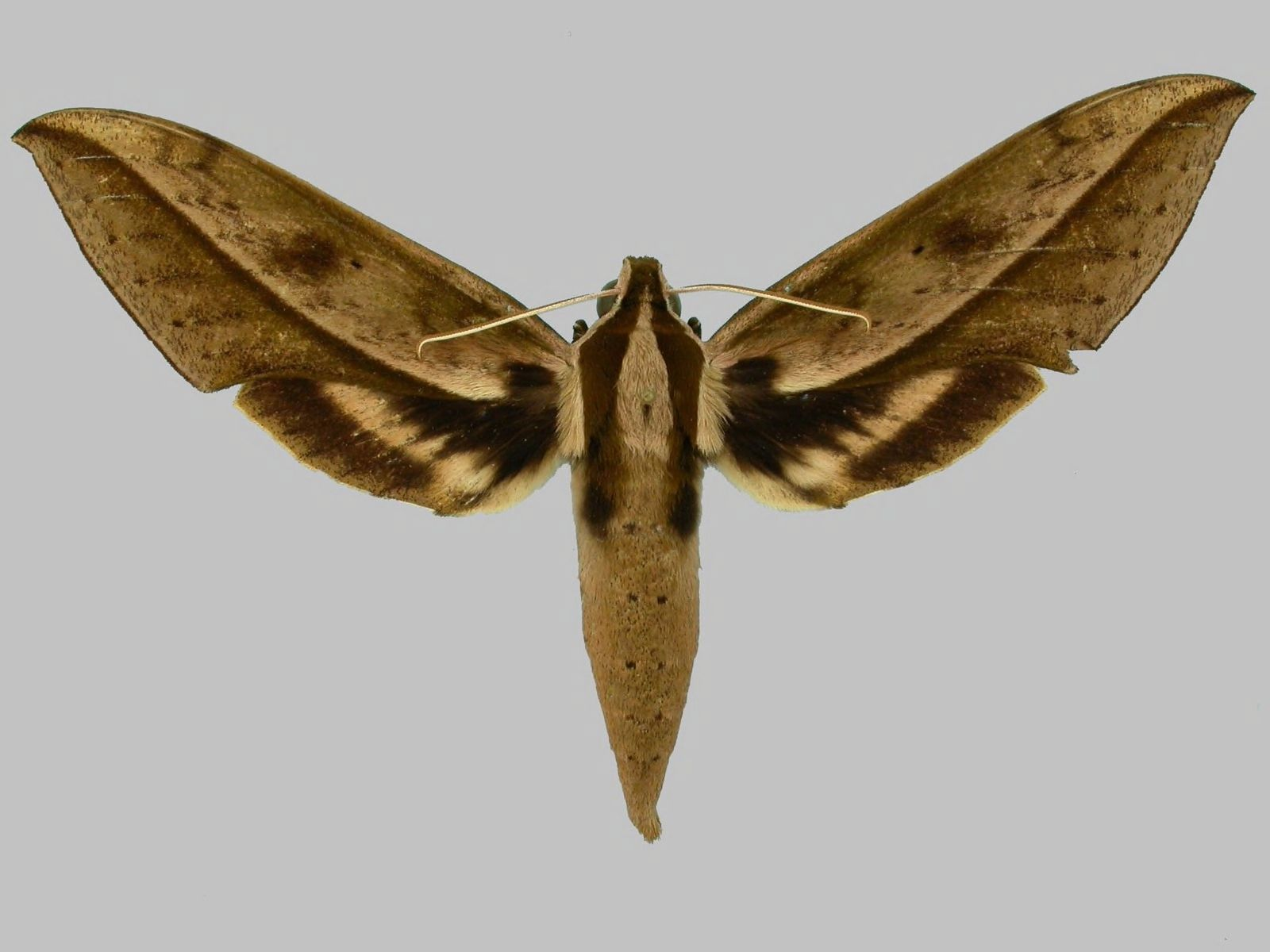

Scientific classification
- Domain: Eukaryota
- Kingdom: Animalia
- Phylum: Arthropoda
- Class: Insecta
- Order: Lepidoptera
- Family: Sphingidae
- Genus: Xylophanes
- Species: X. acrus

Binomial name
- Xylophanes acrus Rothschild & Jordan, 1910

= Xylophanes acrus =

Species of moth

Xylophanes acrus is a moth of the family Sphingidae. It is known to be present in Panama, Costa Rica and Honduras.

The wingspan is 72–83 mm, with females being larger than males. It is similar to Xylophanes cyrene but more green.

Adults are on wing year-round in Costa Rica. In Honduras, adults have been recorded in May.

Larvae have been recorded feeding on Psychotria chiriquina, Psychotria monteverdensis, Psychotria panamensis, Psychotria nervosa and Pavonia guanacastensis.
