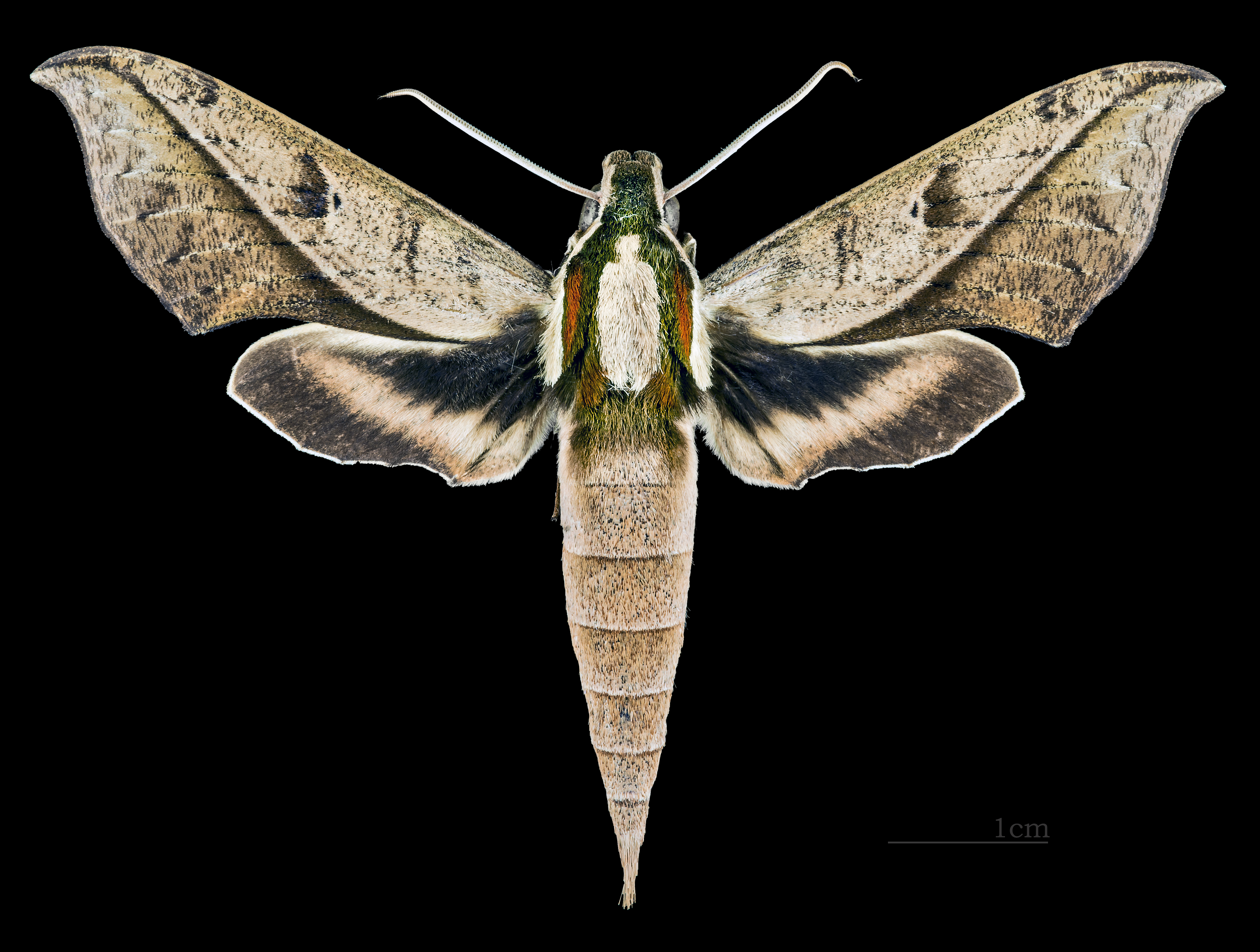
- Upperside
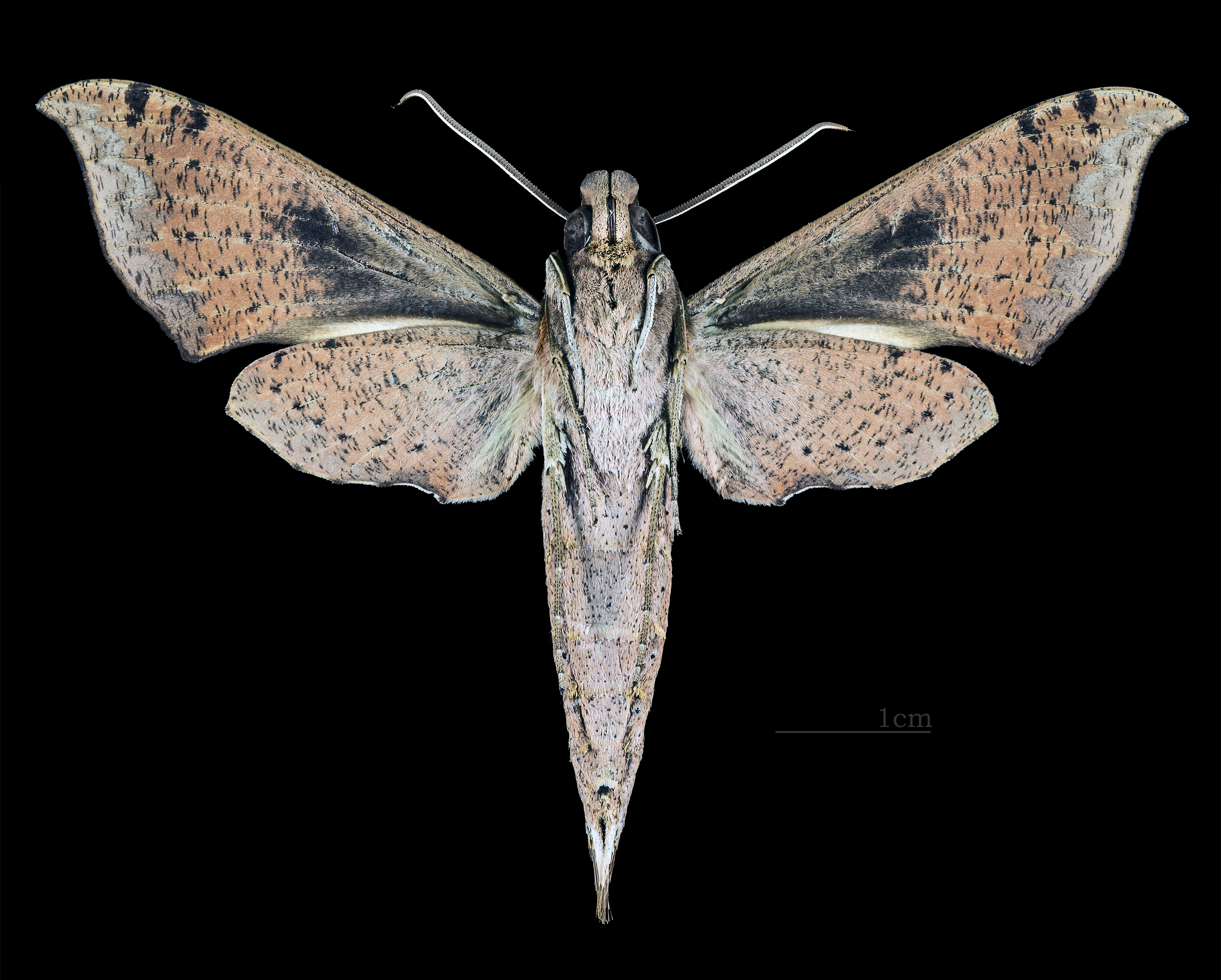
- Underside

Scientific classification
- Domain: Eukaryota
- Kingdom: Animalia
- Phylum: Arthropoda
- Class: Insecta
- Order: Lepidoptera
- Family: Sphingidae
- Genus: Xylophanes
- Species: X. epaphus

Binomial name
- Xylophanes epaphus (Boisduval, 1875)

Synonyms
- Choerocampa epaphus Boisduval, 1875; Theretra boettgeri Rothschild, 1895

= Xylophanes epaphus =

Species of moth

Xylophanes epaphus is a moth of the family Sphingidae first described by Jean Baptiste Boisduval in 1875. It is found from French Guiana possibly as far south as Argentina.

It is somewhat similar to Xylophanes obscurus but generally paler and with a pinkish tint overall. The forewings are shorter and broader and less excavate below the apex. The forewing upperside is similar to Xylophanes obscurus but paler brown, the dark patch distal to the discal spot is smaller, transverse, narrowly oval and less than half the width of that of Xylophanes obscurus. The conspicuous postmedian line is slightly concave and running to the apex.

Adults are probably on wing year round.

The larvae possibly feed on Psychotria panamensis, Psychotria nervosa and Pavonia guanacastensis.
