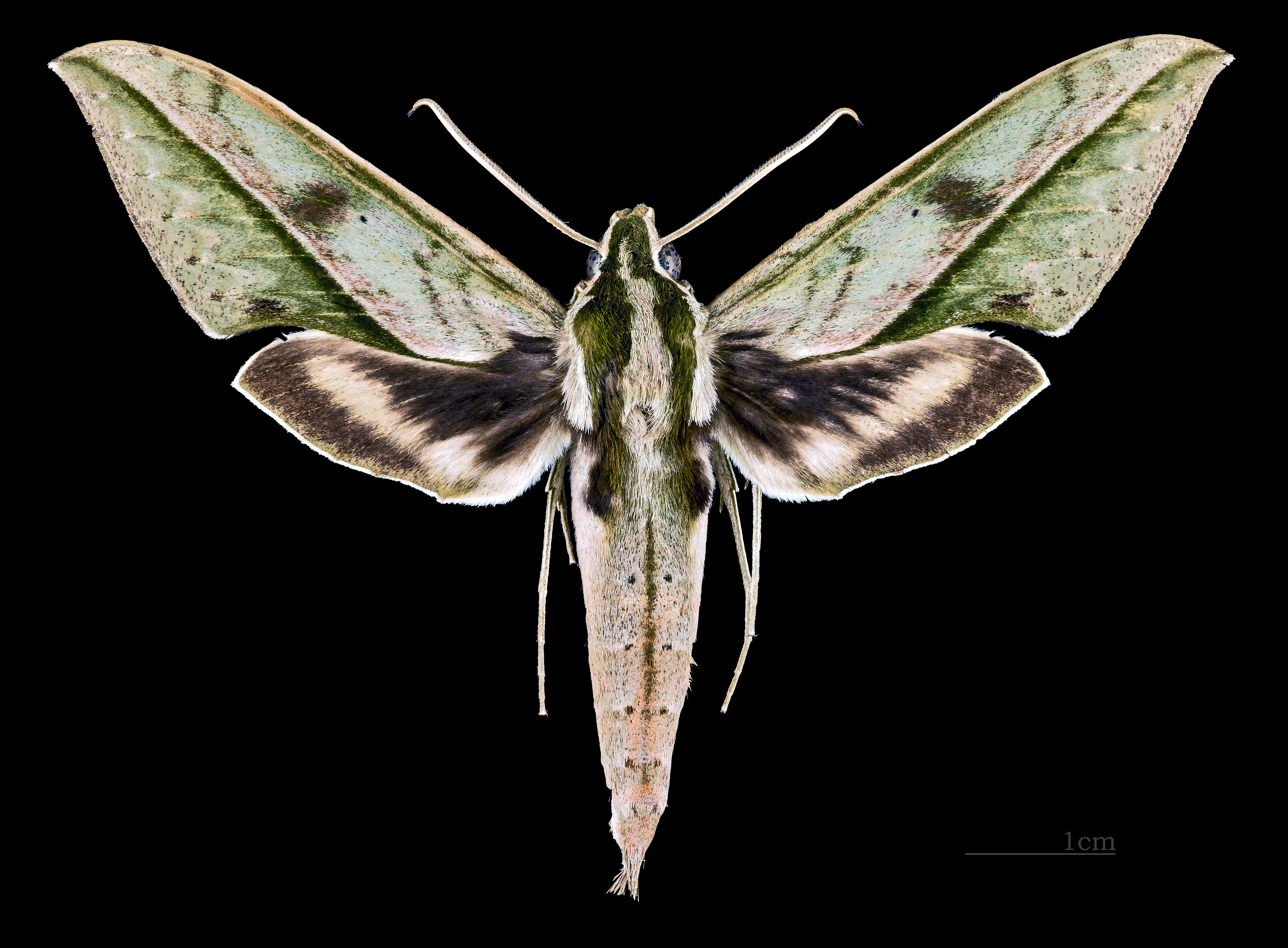
- Xylophanes docilis male dorsal MHNT
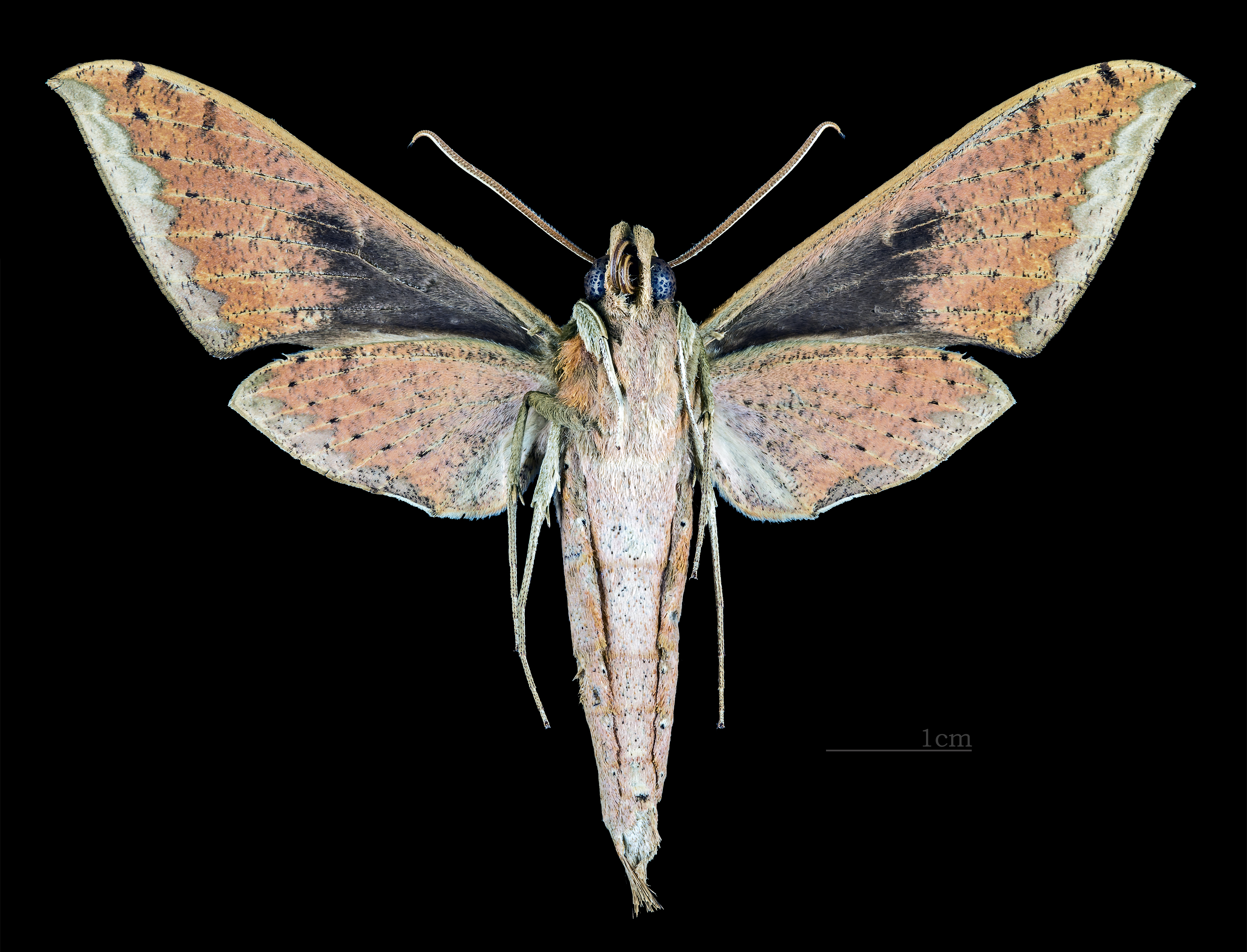
- Xylophanes docilis male ventral MHNT

Scientific classification
- Domain: Eukaryota
- Kingdom: Animalia
- Phylum: Arthropoda
- Class: Insecta
- Order: Lepidoptera
- Family: Sphingidae
- Genus: Xylophanes
- Species: X. docilis

Binomial name
- Xylophanes docilis (Butler, 1875)

Synonyms
- Chaerocampa docilis (Butler, 1875)

= Xylophanes docilis =

Species of moth

Xylophanes docilis is a moth of the family Sphingidae.

== Distribution ==
It is found throughout much of South America, including Ecuador, Bolivia, Argentina and Peru.

== Description ==
The length of the wing is 36–40 mm. It is similar to Xylophanes amadis, but the forewing outer margin is straighter. The abdomen has a distinct dorsal median line. There is a prominent dark green, almost straight postmedian line on the forewing upperside and a vestigial, dentate, submarginal line basal to the submarginal row of the vein spots.

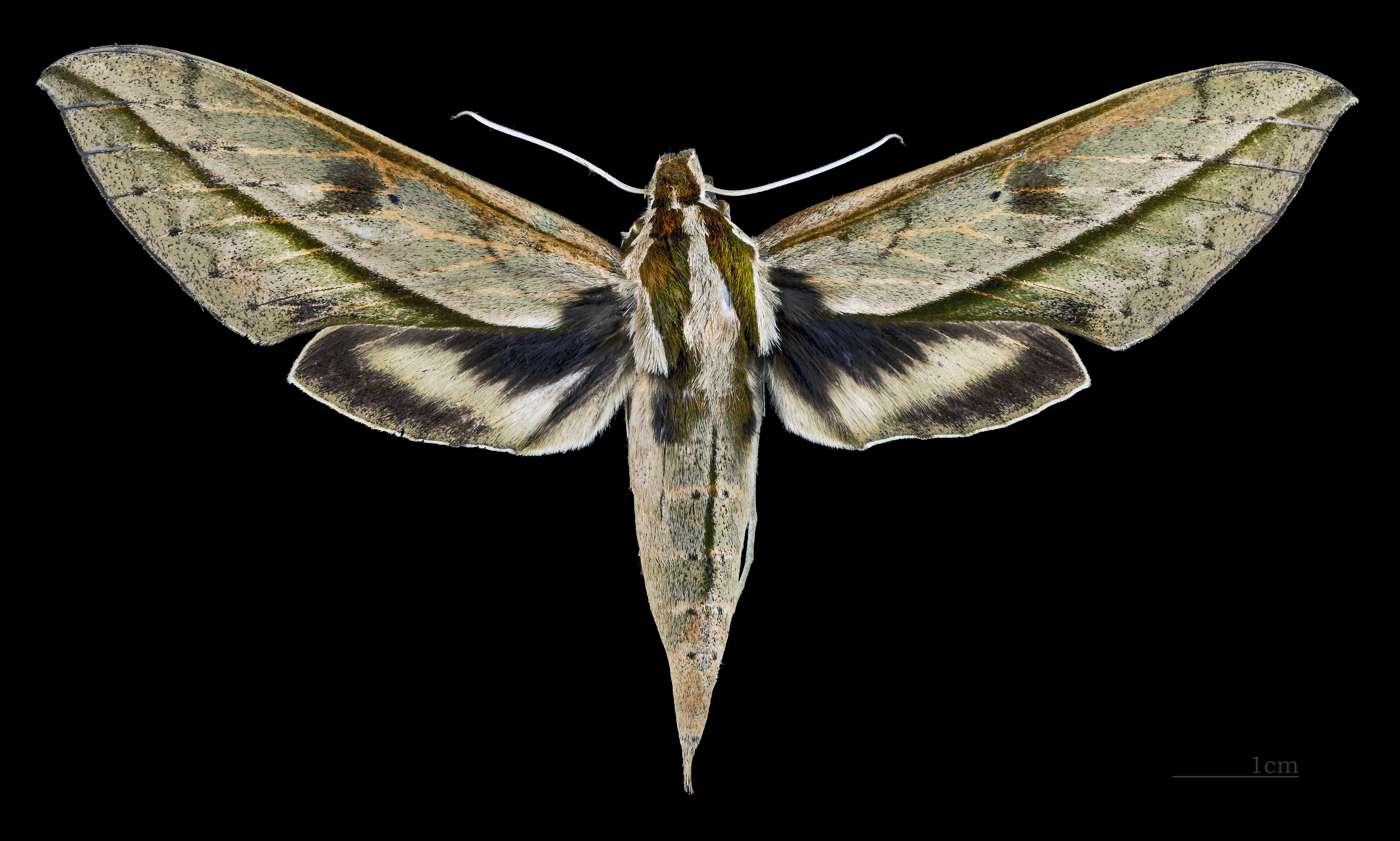
Female dorsal

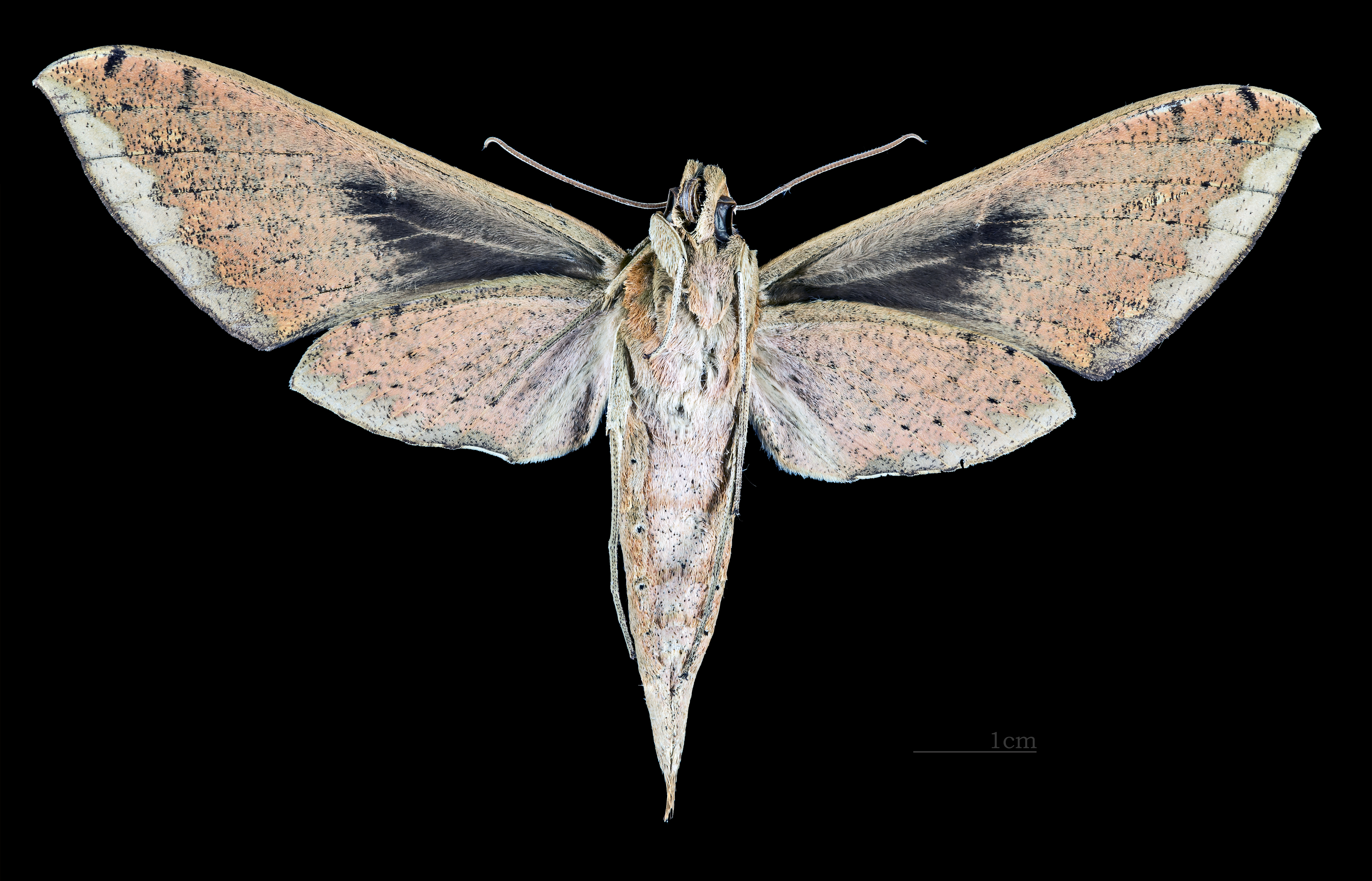
Female ventral

== Biology ==
There are at least two generations per year in Peru with adults on wing in February and again from July to August. Adults have been recorded in February and November in Argentina.

The larvae probably feed on Rubiaceae and Malvaceae species.
