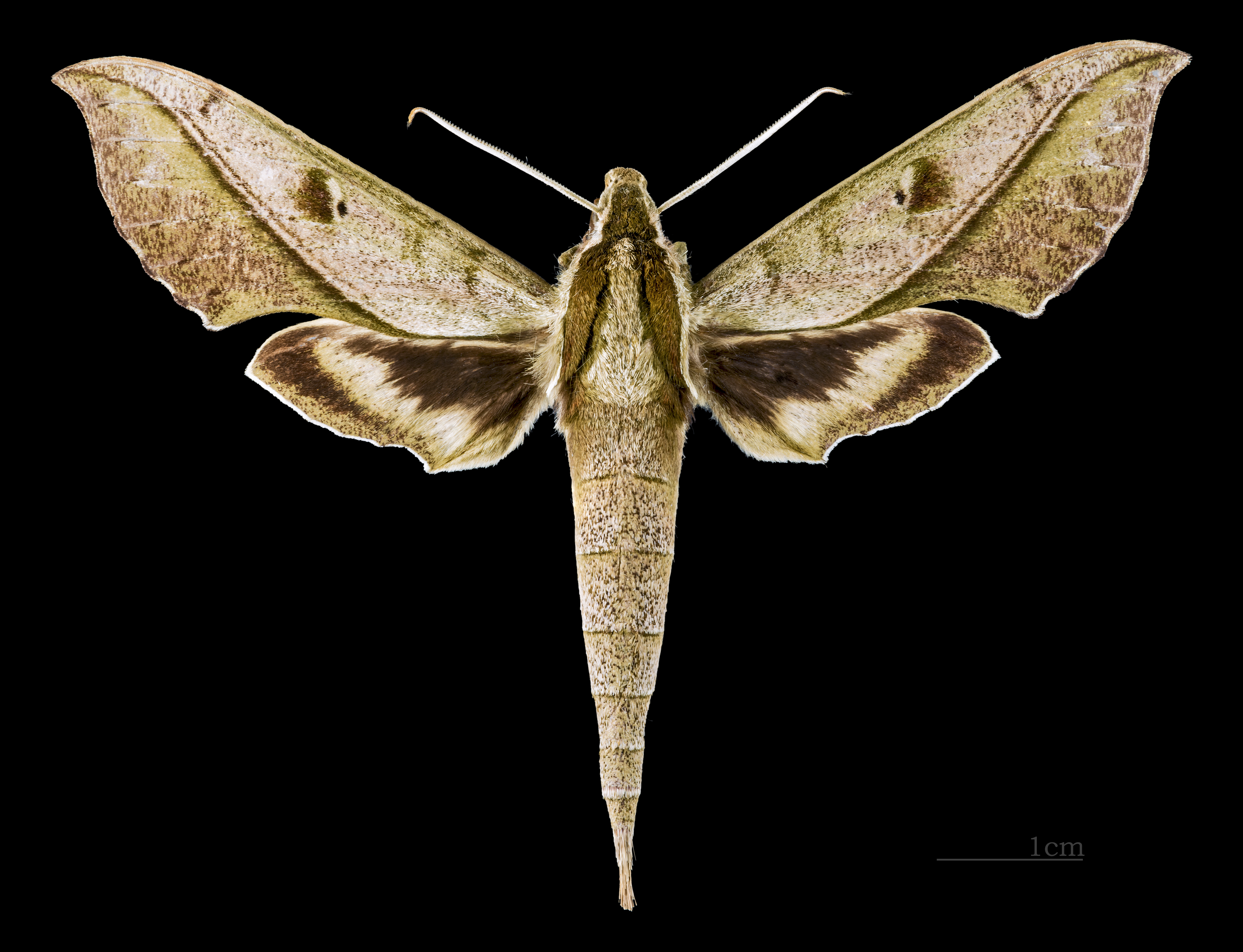
- Xylophanes cosmius Dorsal male MHNT
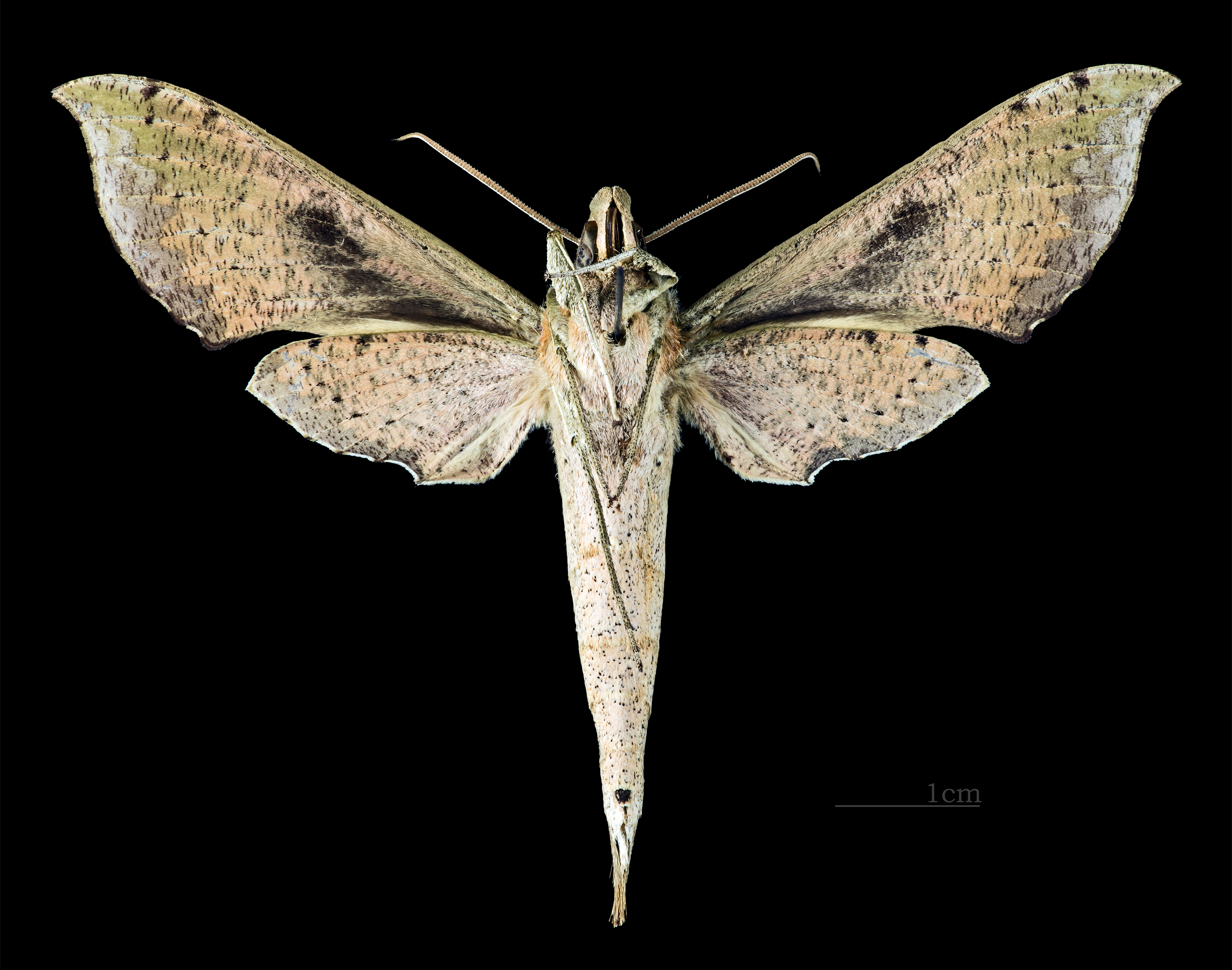
- Xylophanes cosmius Ventral male MHNT

Scientific classification
- Domain: Eukaryota
- Kingdom: Animalia
- Phylum: Arthropoda
- Class: Insecta
- Order: Lepidoptera
- Family: Sphingidae
- Genus: Xylophanes
- Species: X. cosmius

Binomial name
- Xylophanes cosmius Rothschild & Jordan, 1906

Synonyms
- Xylophanes agilis Closs, 1916

= Xylophanes cosmius =

Species of moth

Xylophanes cosmius is a moth of the family Sphingidae. It is found from Ecuador, Peru and Bolivia to western Brazil.

The wingspan is 83–90 mm. It is similar to Xylophanes amadis, but the outer margin of the forewing is scalloped and more excavate below the apex. The abdomen is lacking subdorsal lines of spots on the posterior margins of the tergites and the lateral patches at the base of the abdomen are more poorly defined. The forewing upperside has the same general pattern but the discal spot is more conspicuous since it is surrounded by a small paler area. Furthermore, the darker cloud distal to discal spot is smaller, subtriangular and more well-defined. The fringes are chequered black and white.

There are at least three generations per year in Peru with adults on wing from January to February, July and October.

The larvae probably feed on Rubiaceae and Malvaceae species.
