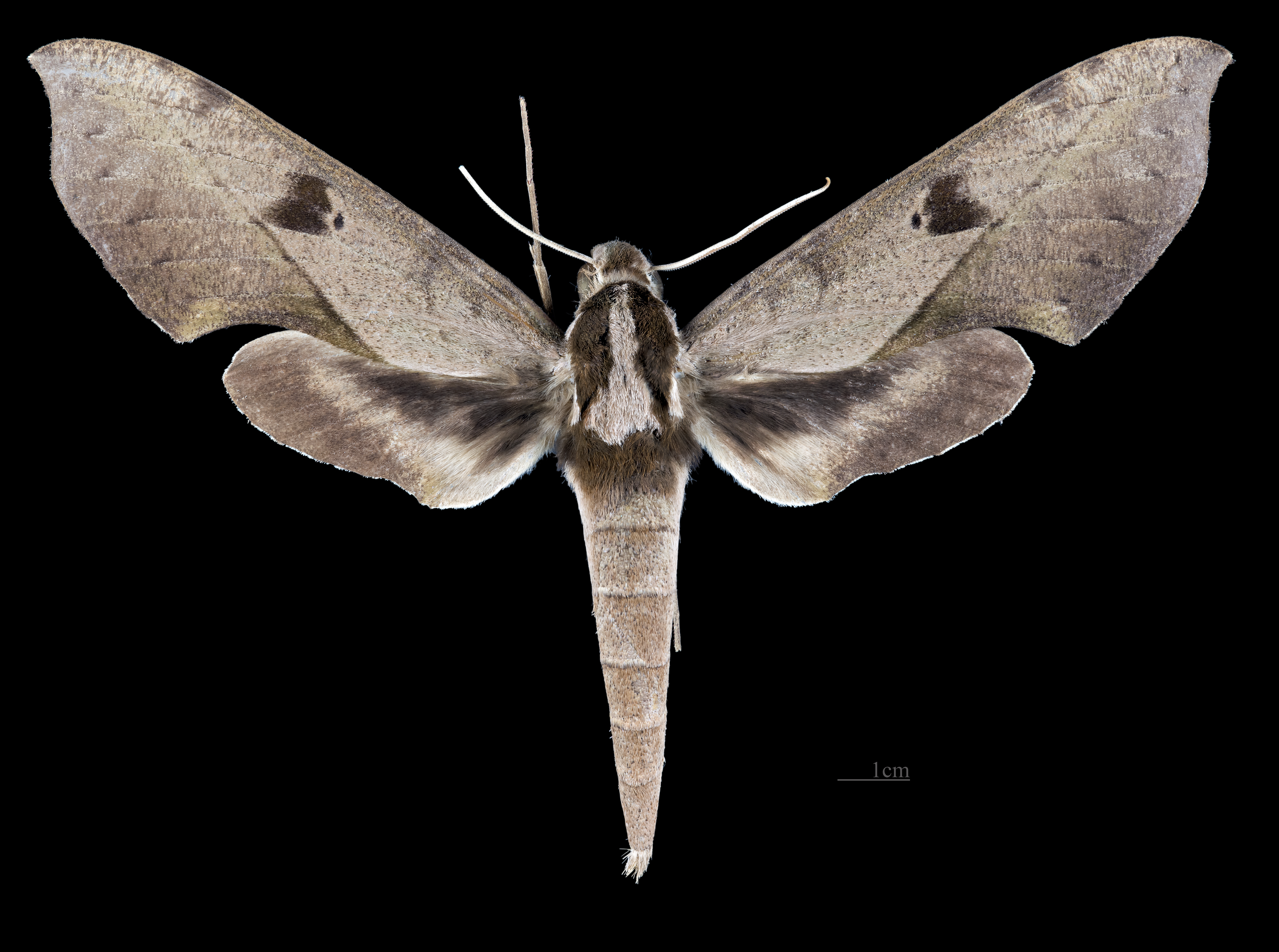
- Male dorsal
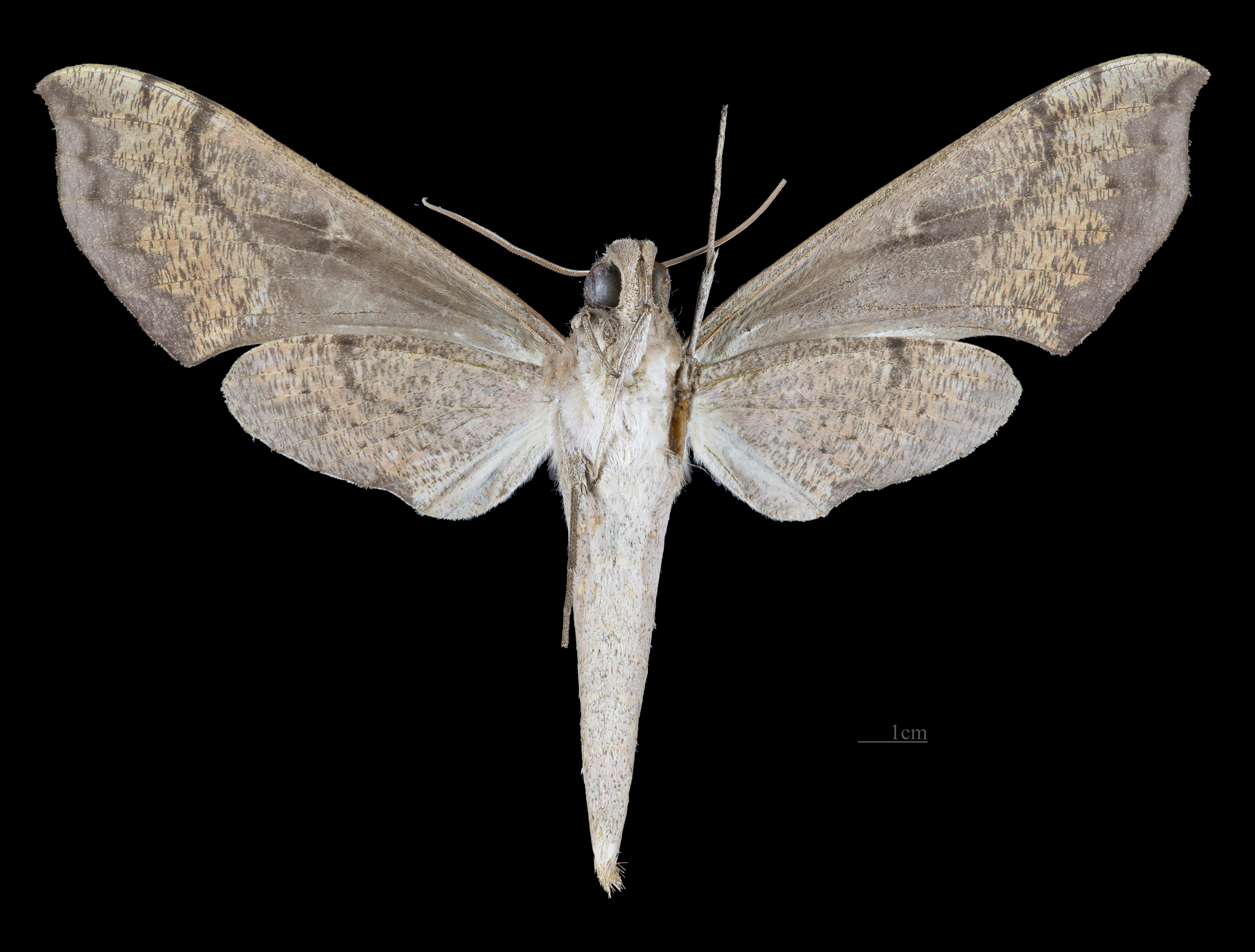
- Male ventral

Scientific classification
- Domain: Eukaryota
- Kingdom: Animalia
- Phylum: Arthropoda
- Class: Insecta
- Order: Lepidoptera
- Family: Sphingidae
- Genus: Xylophanes
- Species: X. obscurus

Binomial name
- Xylophanes obscurus Rothschild & Jordan, 1910

Synonyms
- Xylophanes pizarro Gehlen, 1928

= Xylophanes obscurus =

Species of moth

Xylophanes obscurus is a moth of the family Sphingidae.

== Distribution ==
It is known from Peru and Brazil.

== Description ==
It is similar to Xylophanes cosmius but the forewing upperside is darker, more uniform and sombre brown. Furthermore, the dark patch distal to discal spot is larger and trapezoidal. The conspicuous postmedian line is straight or slightly convex, reaching the costa before the apex. The fringes are not chequered.

== Biology ==
There are probably at least three generations per year.

The larvae probably feed on Rubiaceae and Malvaceae species.
