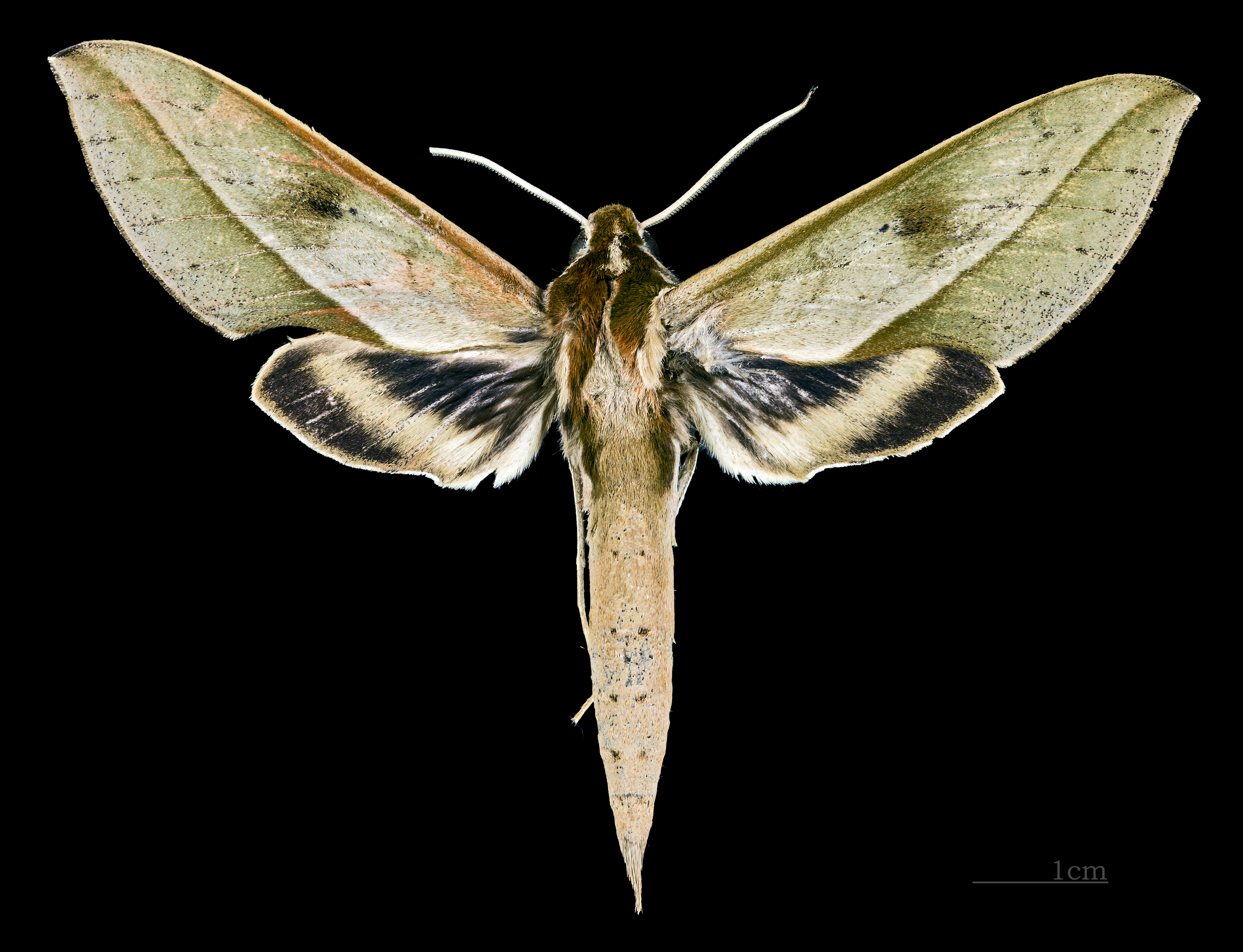
- Dorsal view

Scientific classification
- Domain: Eukaryota
- Kingdom: Animalia
- Phylum: Arthropoda
- Class: Insecta
- Order: Lepidoptera
- Family: Sphingidae
- Genus: Xylophanes
- Species: X. cyrene

Binomial name
- Xylophanes cyrene (H. Druce, 1881)

Synonyms
- Chaerocampa cyrene H. Druce, 1881; Theretra drucei Kirby, 1892

= Xylophanes cyrene =

Species of moth

Xylophanes cyrene is a moth of the family Sphingidae first described by Herbert Druce in 1881. It is found in Mexico, Panama, Costa Rica, Guatemala, Belize and south to Oxapampa in Peru.

== Description ==
The wingspan is 76–91 mm. It is similar to Xylophanes amadis but the upperside ground colour is brownish and the pale median band is always uninterrupted by black streaks along the veins.

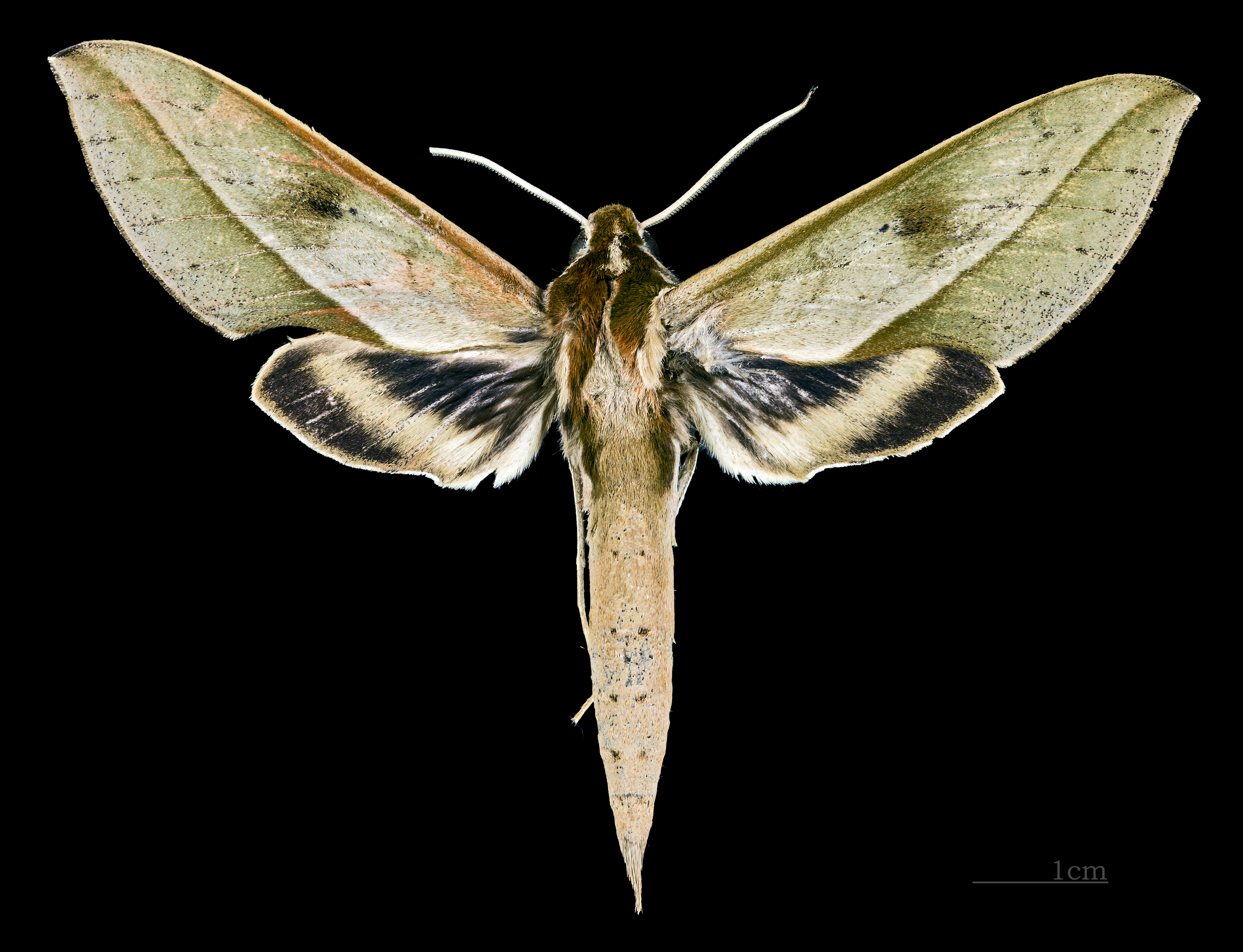
Male dorsal view

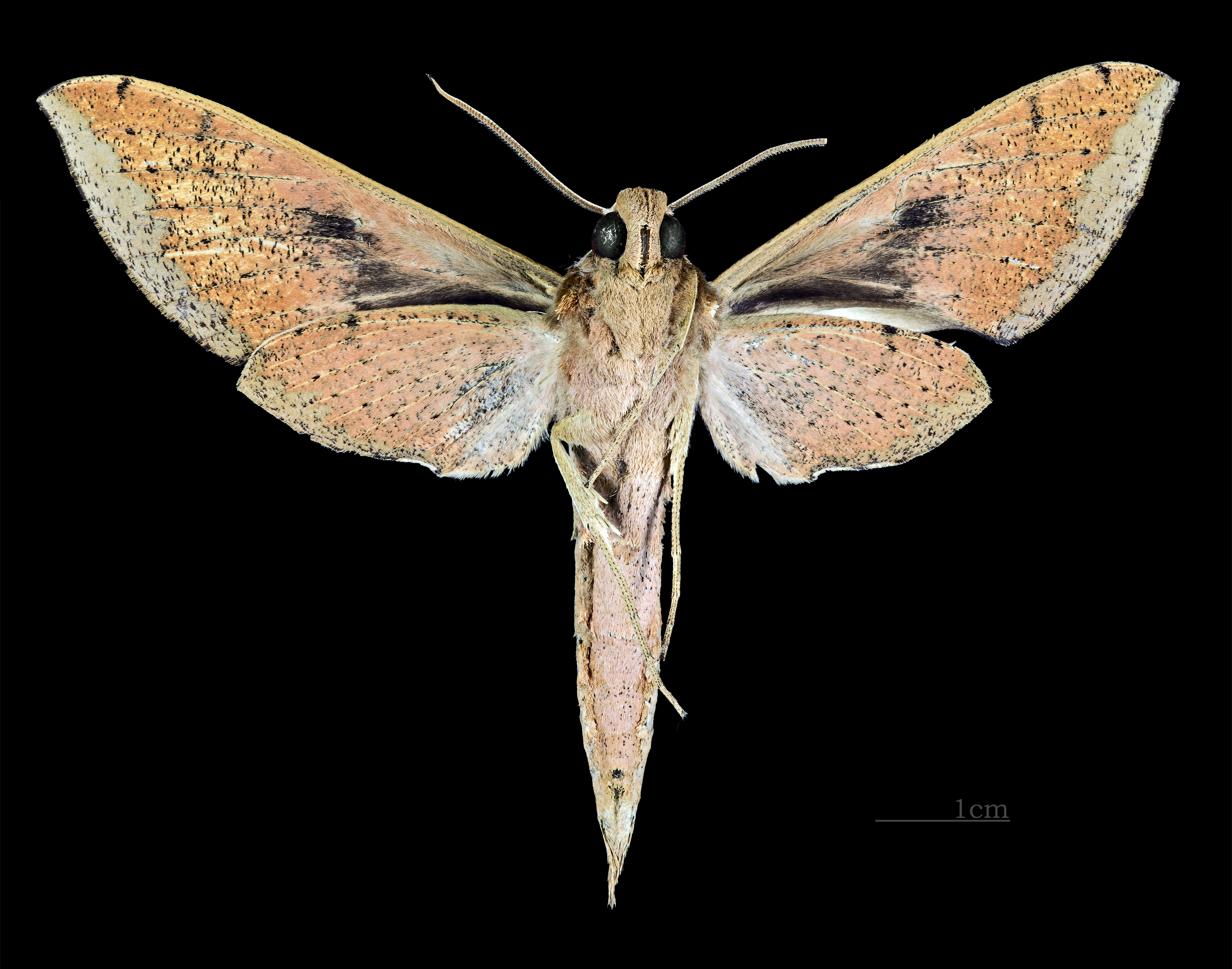
Male ventral view

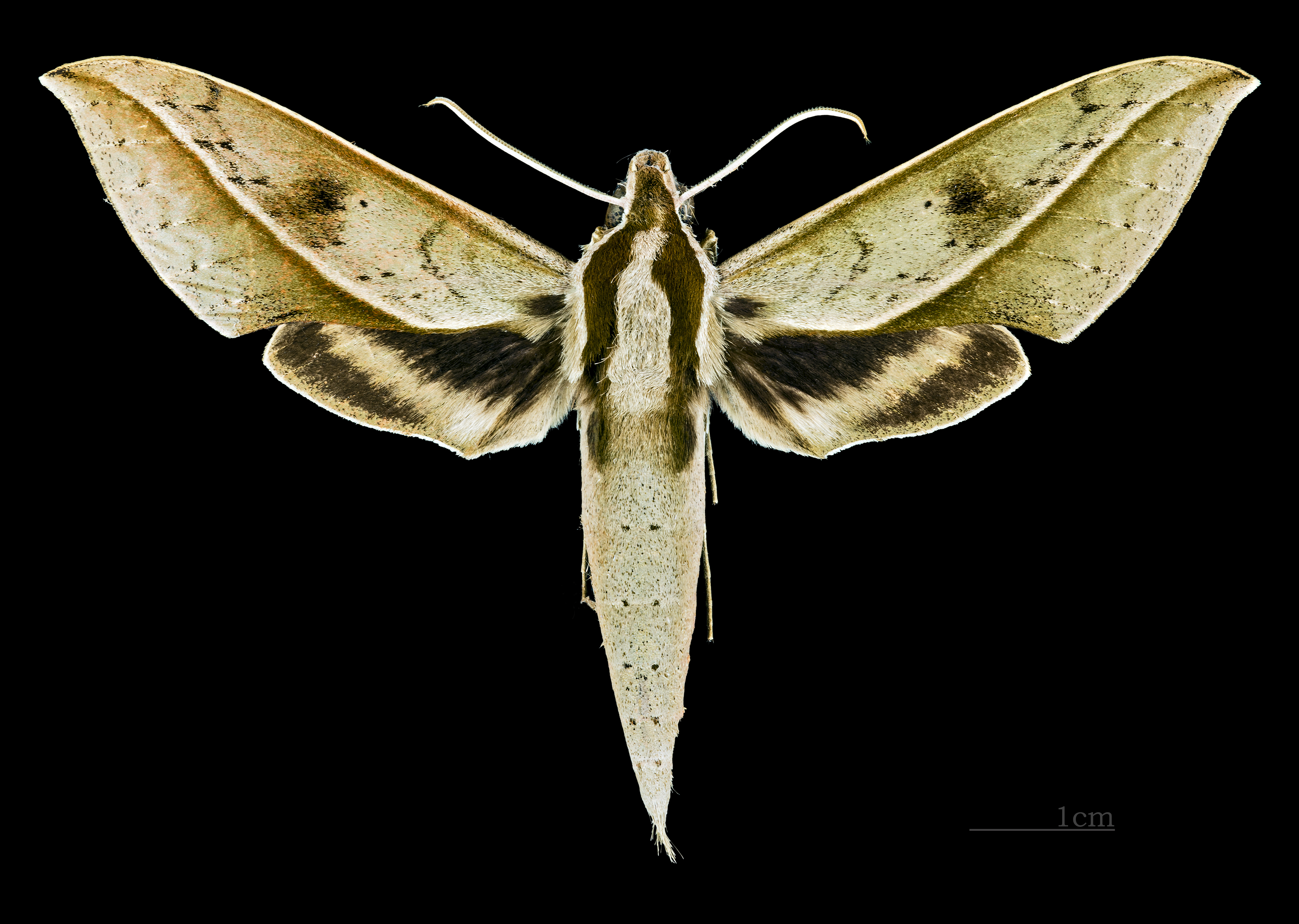
Female dorsal view

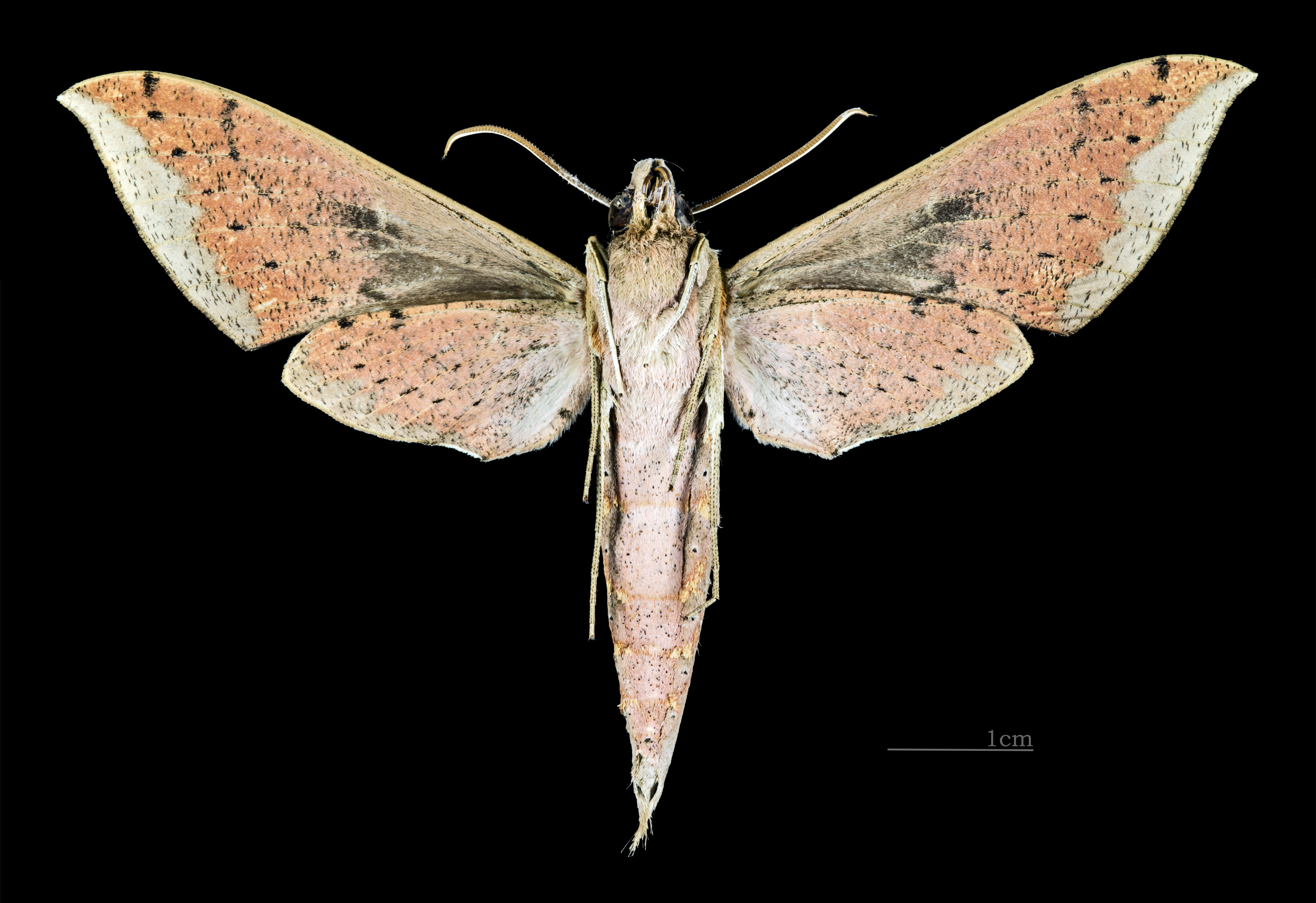
Female ventral view

== Biology ==
Adults are probably on wing year round in Costa Rica.

The larvae feed on Curatella americana, Psychotria panamensis and Psychotria grandis. Early instars are generally green, but there are green and dark colour morphs in the final instar.
