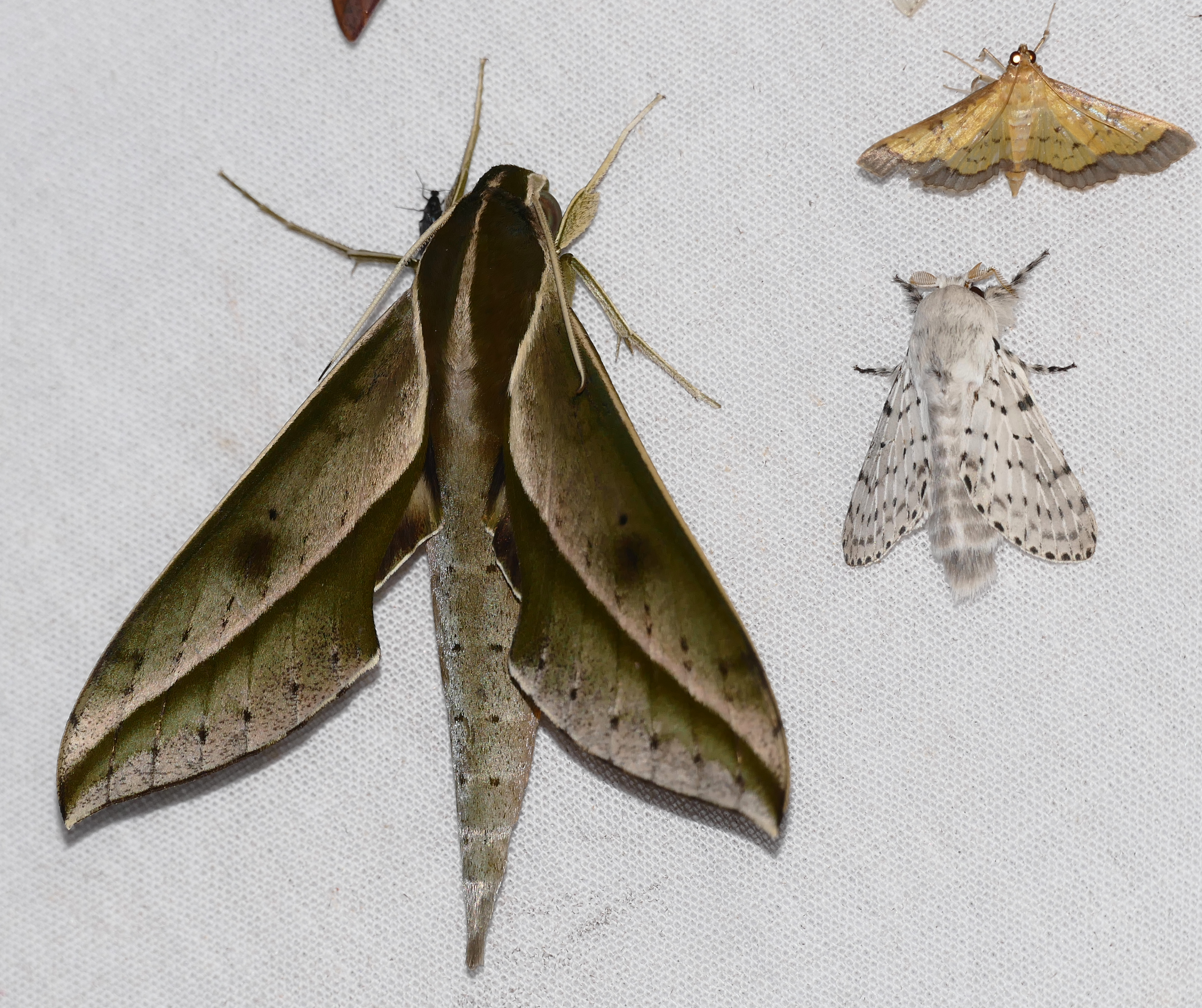

Scientific classification
- Domain: Eukaryota
- Kingdom: Animalia
- Phylum: Arthropoda
- Class: Insecta
- Order: Lepidoptera
- Family: Sphingidae
- Genus: Xylophanes
- Species: X. amadis

Binomial name
- Xylophanes amadis (Stoll, 1782)

Synonyms
- Sphinx amadis Stoll, 1782; Chaerocampa thalassina Clemens, 1859; Xylophanes stuarti Rothschild, 1894; Xylophanes amadis goeldi Rothschild & Jordan, 1903

= Xylophanes amadis =

Species of moth

Xylophanes amadis is large moth of the Family Sphingidae.

== Distribution ==
It is found in Suriname, and westward through Guyana, Venezuela and Bolivia.

== Description ==
The wingspan is about 80 mm (3.1 in). The abdomen has no dorsal median line and the subdorsal lines are represented only by small dark green spots on the posterior margins of the tergites. The forewing upperside is deep green. The basal black patch is present on the inner edge and two thin, dark green antemedian lines are present, curving from the inner margin to the costa. There is a single prominent, dark green, slightly sigmoid, postmedian line running from the inner margin to the apex, shading off distally, sharply defined basally by a pale border. Anterior to this line are the vestiges of two or three other postmedian lines, either very thin and evenly curved or represented only by vein spots. The submarginal line is also represented only by a series of vein spots. The discal spot is small, black and sharply defined.

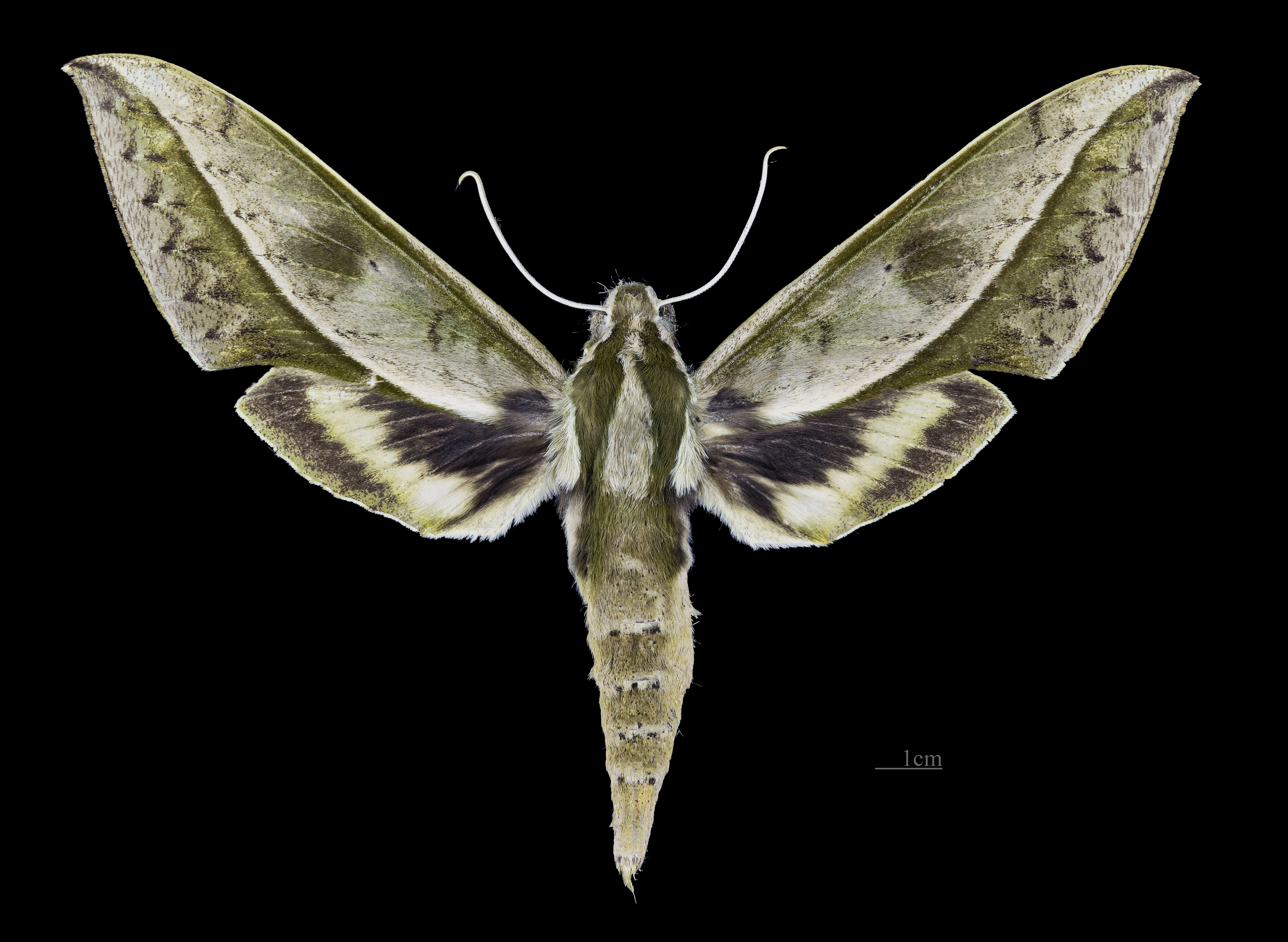
Male dorsal
(coll.MHNT)

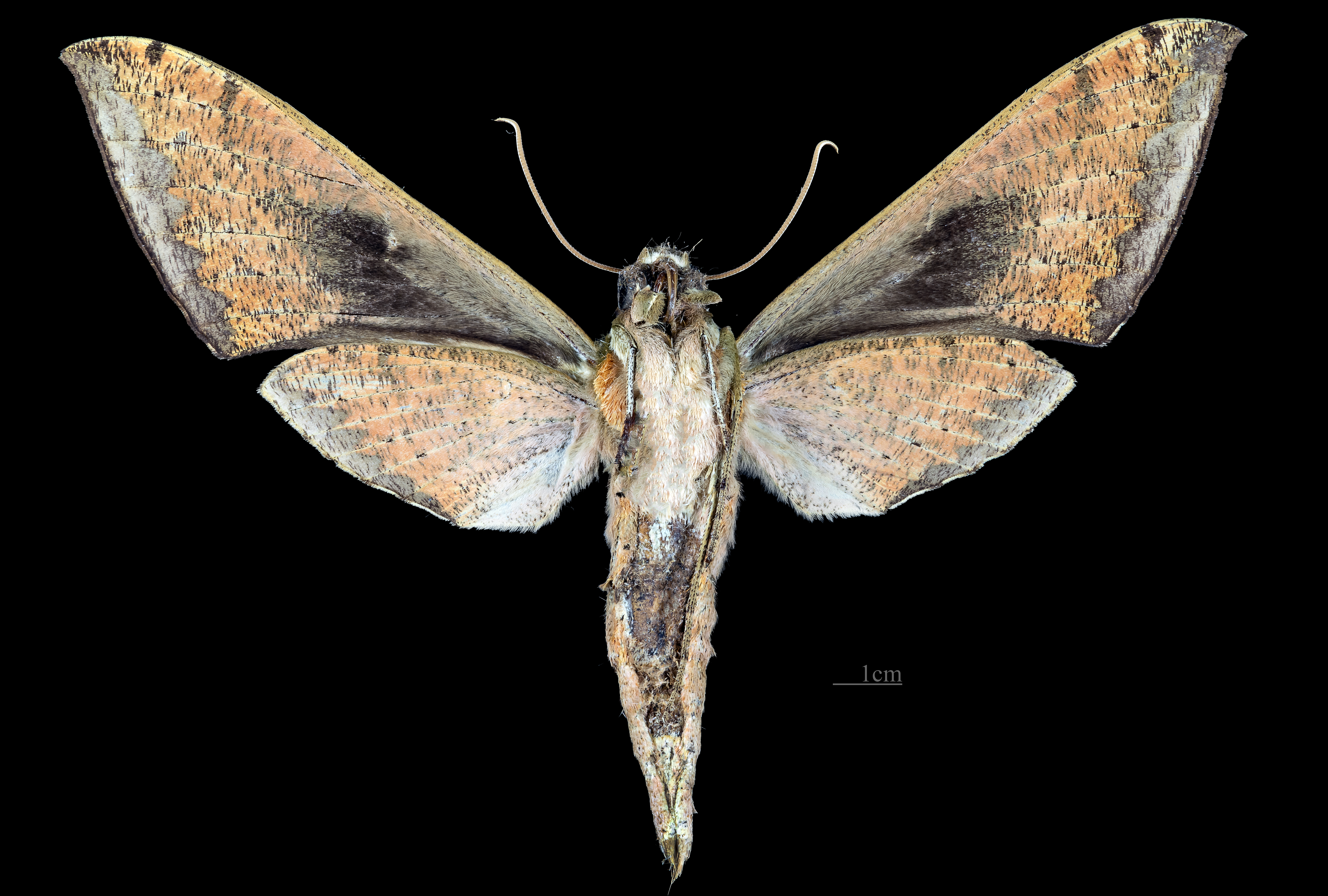
Male ventral
(coll.MHNT)

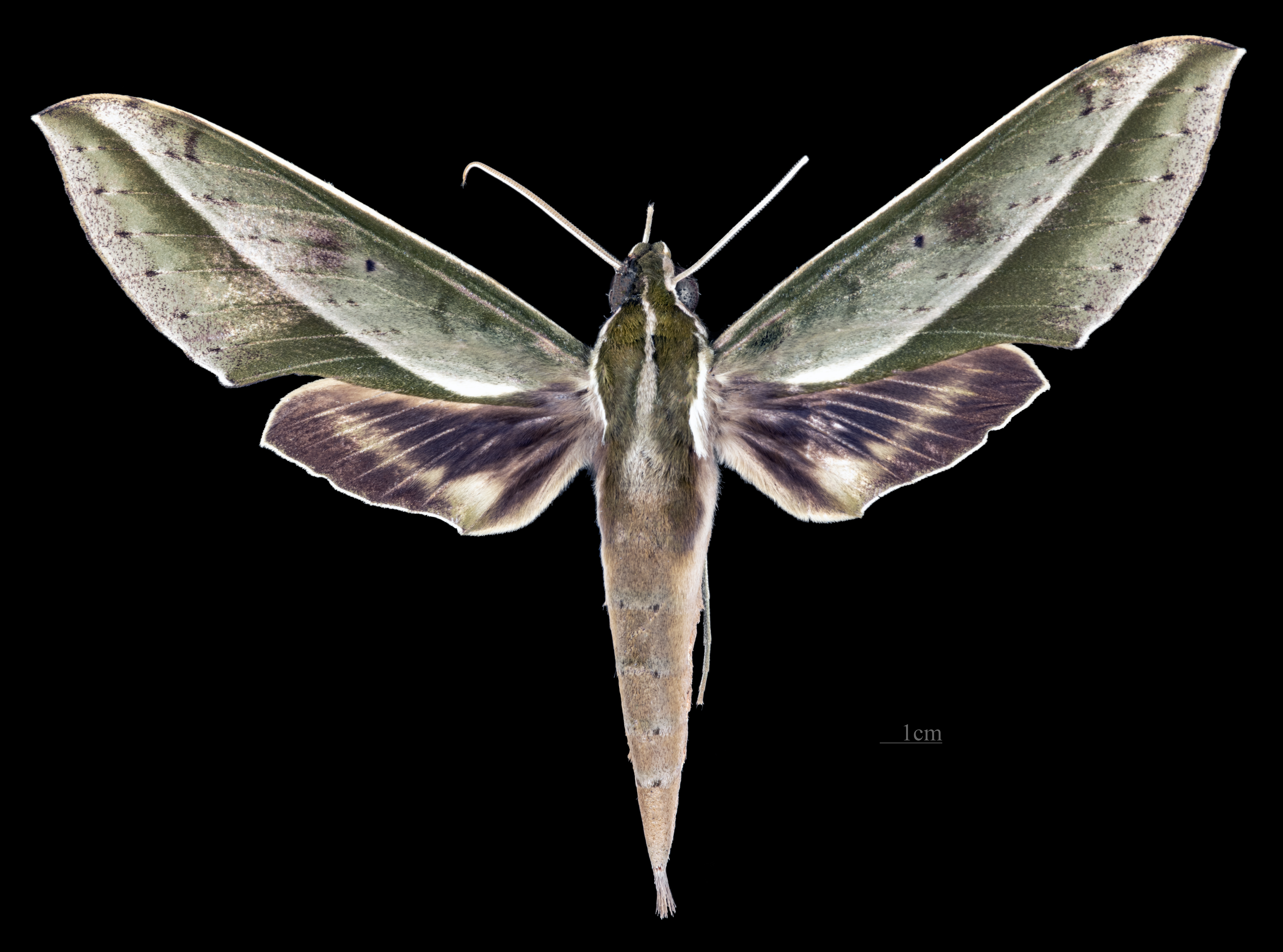
Female dorsal
(coll.MHNT)

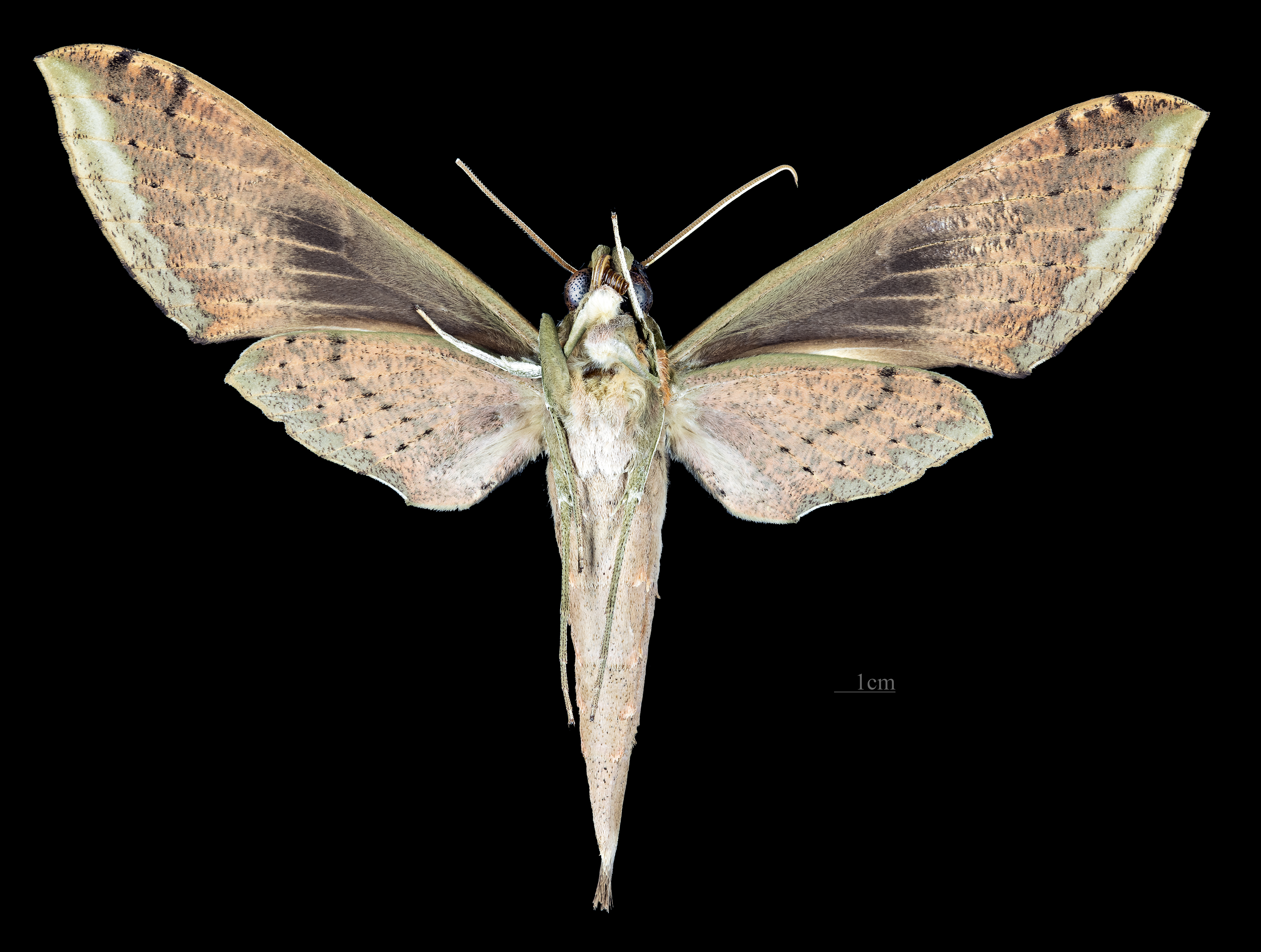
Female ventral
(coll.MHNT)
