= G. fimbriata =

G. fimbriata may refer to:

- Girella fimbriata, a fish species
- Gonionota fimbriata, a moth species
