= Gonionota lecithitis =

Scientific classification
- Kingdom: Animalia
- Phylum: Arthropoda
- Class: Insecta
- Order: Lepidoptera
- Family: Depressariidae
- Genus: Gonionota
- Species: G. lecithitis

Binomial name
- Gonionota lecithitis (Meyrick, 1912)

Synonyms
- Coptotelia lecithitis Meyrick, 1912

Species of moth

Gonionota lecithitis is a moth in the family Depressariidae. It was described by Edward Meyrick in 1912. It is found in Argentina.

The wingspan is 15–18 mm. The forewings are ferruginous brownish, sometimes sprinkled with dark fuscous and with an ochreous-yellowish basal patch occupying nearly two-fifths of the wing, reticulated with ferruginous brownish and marked with a brown costal streak, the outer edge curved. The first discal stigma is small and white, with some dark fuscous scales, the second dark fuscous, preceded by pale yellowish suffusion. There is a small oblique suffused white mark on the costa at two-thirds, and some white irroration beyond this. A streak of blackish irroration is found between veins 2 and 3 and sometimes there is a subterminal series of cloudy blackish dots. There is also a cloudy dark fuscous terminal line or series of dots. The hindwings are ochreous whitish.
