= Gonionota sphenogramma =

Scientific classification
- Domain: Eukaryota
- Kingdom: Animalia
- Phylum: Arthropoda
- Class: Insecta
- Order: Lepidoptera
- Family: Depressariidae
- Genus: Gonionota
- Species: G. sphenogramma

Binomial name
- Gonionota sphenogramma J. F. G. Clarke, 1971

Species of moth

Gonionota sphenogramma is a moth in the family Depressariidae. It was described by John Frederick Gates Clarke in 1971, and is found in Venezuela.

The wingspan is 17–18 mm, and the forewings are brown with pronounced grey dusting, particularly in the basal half. At the basal two fifths of the costa is a small white spot preceded by dark grey and the basal third of the costa is yellowish. The costa at the middle, is dark grey, recurved, and followed outwardly by a shallow excavation, the latter white, broadened outwardly into a wedge-shaped mark, edged yellowish. On the costa, preceding the apex, is a slender white streak and the discal spot at the basal third is dark grey, at the end of the cell white. The tornus is dusted dark grey. The hindwings are light grey suffused brownish toward the margins.
