= Gonionota uberrima =

Scientific classification
- Kingdom: Animalia
- Phylum: Arthropoda
- Class: Insecta
- Order: Lepidoptera
- Family: Depressariidae
- Genus: Gonionota
- Species: G. uberrima

Binomial name
- Gonionota uberrima (Meyrick, 1914)

Synonyms
- Hypercallia uberrima Meyrick, 1914

Species of moth

Gonionota uberrima is a moth in the family Depressariidae. It was described by Edward Meyrick in 1914. It is found in Peru.

The wingspan is about 18 mm. The forewings are ferruginous with a deep yellow blotch occupying the basal two-fifths, except the costal third, its outer edge convex and extended to the costa as a slender streak, a light ferruginous line crosses this blotch at one-fourth of the wing, terminating in its dorsal angle. There is a short oblique white strigula on the costa at three-fourths. The hindwings are coppery fulvous.
