= Gonionota prolectans =

Scientific classification
- Kingdom: Animalia
- Phylum: Arthropoda
- Class: Insecta
- Order: Lepidoptera
- Family: Depressariidae
- Genus: Gonionota
- Species: G. prolectans

Binomial name
- Gonionota prolectans (Meyrick, 1926)

Synonyms
- Hypercallia prolectans Meyrick, 1926

Species of moth

Gonionota prolectans is a moth in the family Depressariidae. It was described by Edward Meyrick in 1926. It is found in Colombia.

The wingspan is 23–24 mm. The forewings are brown, on the costal half more or less suffused crimson except towards the termen and with an undefined patch of crimson-yellowish suffusion towards the costa somewhat before the middle, its anterior edge forming a small more distinct yellow spot. The second discal stigma is minute and white and there is a white semifusiform mark on the costa about three-fourths. The veins tend to be marked with very fine dark fuscous lines, with a stronger streak on 1b. There is also a suffused white terminal line, with some irroration preceding it. The hindwings are grey.
