= Gonionota saulopis =

Scientific classification
- Domain: Eukaryota
- Kingdom: Animalia
- Phylum: Arthropoda
- Class: Insecta
- Order: Lepidoptera
- Family: Depressariidae
- Genus: Gonionota
- Species: G. saulopis

Binomial name
- Gonionota saulopis Meyrick, 1909

Species of moth

Gonionota saulopis is a moth in the family Depressariidae. It was described by Edward Meyrick in 1909. It is found in Bolivia and Peru.

The wingspan is 22–23 mm. The forewings are dark ferruginous brown, with irregular transverse paler striae slightly irrorated with whitish, the interspaces usually more or less mixed with blackish grey except towards the costa. There is a slightly paler curved transverse band before the middle, irrorated with white and pale rosy towards the costa and towards the posterior two-fifths of the costa, the striae become white, partly tinged with pale rosy. The first discal stigma is blackish and distinct, preceded by a small blackish dot obliquely above it, the second is dark grey and indistinct. The hindwings are white with a dark fuscous apical blotch covering two-fifths of the wing, the anterior edge straight.
