= Gonionota cristata =

Scientific classification
- Domain: Eukaryota
- Kingdom: Animalia
- Phylum: Arthropoda
- Class: Insecta
- Order: Lepidoptera
- Family: Depressariidae
- Genus: Gonionota
- Species: G. cristata

Binomial name
- Gonionota cristata Walsingham, 1912

Species of moth

Gonionota cristata is a moth in the family Depressariidae. It was described by Lord Walsingham in 1912. It is found in Panama.

The wingspan is about 17 mm. The forewings are rich reddish ochreous at the base, very dark brownish beyond, the basal third with some admixture of ochreous and dark fuscous scaling. A curved line of dark fuscous marks the not-very-clearly defined, outwardly-bowed edge of the bright basal patch, in the middle of which a shorter line of similar scales crosses the fold, others lying along the line of the fold itself. Commencing a little before the outer fourth of the costa is a line of white scale-spots, tending at first very obliquely outward, but bent down parallel to the termen from a point opposite the apex. There is also a minute white spot at the end of the cell. The hindwings are dark brownish fuscous.
