= Gonionota eremia =

Scientific classification
- Domain: Eukaryota
- Kingdom: Animalia
- Phylum: Arthropoda
- Class: Insecta
- Order: Lepidoptera
- Family: Depressariidae
- Genus: Gonionota
- Species: G. eremia

Binomial name
- Gonionota eremia J. F. G. Clarke, 1971

Species of moth

Gonionota eremia is a moth in the family Depressariidae. It was described by John Frederick Gates Clarke in 1971. It is found in French Guiana and Guyana.

The wingspan is 16–19 mm. The forewings are auburn, with at the apical third of the costa a small whitish streak and at the basal third, in the cell, a minute fuscous spot and at the end of the cell a pale, buff spot. Between veins 11 and 12 opposite the base of 11, is a minute fuscous fused spot. The dorsum is narrowly fuscous. The hindwings are fuscous, the scales loosely attached.
