= Gonionota melobaphes =

Scientific classification
- Domain: Eukaryota
- Kingdom: Animalia
- Phylum: Arthropoda
- Class: Insecta
- Order: Lepidoptera
- Family: Depressariidae
- Genus: Gonionota
- Species: G. melobaphes

Binomial name
- Gonionota melobaphes Walsingham, 1912

Species of moth

Gonionota melobaphes is a moth in the family Depressariidae. It was described by Lord Walsingham in 1912. It is found in Panama and Costa Rica.

The wingspan is 18–22 mm. The forewings are tawny brown, with darker and paler shades, approaching tawny fuscous, on and below the middle of the fold and a little before the apex, and fawn brown toward the termen. A broad patch of yellow, suffused with reddish ochreous and slightly speckled with brown scales extends from the base to one-sixth of the wing length along the dorsum, to one-half along the costa and to the end of the cell below it, being somewhat arched and partially interrupted before the middle of the wing. Towards the apex the extreme costa is narrowly white. The hindwings are pale yellowish brown.
