= Gonionota cologramma =

Scientific classification
- Domain: Eukaryota
- Kingdom: Animalia
- Phylum: Arthropoda
- Class: Insecta
- Order: Lepidoptera
- Family: Depressariidae
- Genus: Gonionota
- Species: G. cologramma

Binomial name
- Gonionota cologramma J. F. G. Clarke, 1971

Species of moth

Gonionota cologramma is a moth in the family Depressariidae. It was described by John Frederick Gates Clarke in 1971. It is found in Venezuela.

The wingspan is about 20 mm. The forewings are tawny, the outer half crossed by numerous, irregular, fine pale lines. The costa is narrowly grey mixed with some pink scales and at the apical fifth of the costa is a grey spot. There are two blackish discal spots at the basal third, in the cell, one larger than the other and at the end of the cell is a white spot. Around the termen is a series of short blackish dashes and there is a dark brown spot on the fold, about the middle. The dorsum has a conspicuous brown stripe. The costal area, and from the fold to the brown dorsal streak, is suffused rosy pink. The hindwings are buff, somewhat darker toward the anal angle.
