= Gonionota selene =

Scientific classification
- Domain: Eukaryota
- Kingdom: Animalia
- Phylum: Arthropoda
- Class: Insecta
- Order: Lepidoptera
- Family: Depressariidae
- Genus: Gonionota
- Species: G. selene

Binomial name
- Gonionota selene J. F. G. Clarke, 1971

Species of moth

Gonionota selene is a moth in the family Depressariidae. It was described by John Frederick Gates Clarke in 1971. It is found in Santa Catarina, Brazil.

The wingspan is about 20 mm. The forewings are russet, at the base of the dorsum a light chrome-yellow blotch extending across the fold and bordered on the outer edge with a short fuscous dash. The costa is grey brown except at two thirds a white, wedge-shaped mark. At two fifths of the costa is a short chrome-yellow transverse fascia not reaching the middle of the wing and at the end of the cell is a small fuscous dot. The dorsum, beyond the chrome-yellow basal blotch, is broadly fuscous to the termen at vein 3. The dark dorsal area is overlaid avellaneous (dull greyish brown) in the central part and from the apex to vein 5 is an ill-defined, quadrate chrome-yellow area. The hindwings are whitish ochreous, basally shading to pale brown at the apex and greyish fuscous in the anal area.
