= Gonionota habristis =

Scientific classification
- Kingdom: Animalia
- Phylum: Arthropoda
- Class: Insecta
- Order: Lepidoptera
- Family: Depressariidae
- Genus: Gonionota
- Species: G. habristis

Binomial name
- Gonionota habristis (Meyrick, 1914)

Synonyms
- Hypercallia habristis Meyrick, 1914

Species of moth

Gonionota habristis is a moth in the family Depressariidae. It was described by Edward Meyrick in 1914. It is found in Guyana and Peru.

The wingspan is about 16 mm. The forewings are brown suffused with pale purplish rosy and with a yellow basal patch occupying nearly one-fourth of the wing but not reaching the costa, nearly followed in the disc by a roundish yellow blotch reaching the small black first discal stigma. The second discal stigma is small and white and there is a dark ferruginous-brown patch on the costa beyond the middle, followed by a very obliquely placed series of three white marks with some blackish scales adjoining. There is also a yellow fasciaform blotch extending along the termen throughout, edged all around with dark ferruginous brown. The hindwings are light grey, the apex and upper part of the termen suffused with light yellowish.
