= Gonionota excavata =

Scientific classification
- Domain: Eukaryota
- Kingdom: Animalia
- Phylum: Arthropoda
- Class: Insecta
- Order: Lepidoptera
- Family: Depressariidae
- Genus: Gonionota
- Species: G. excavata

Binomial name
- Gonionota excavata Clarke, 1964

Species of moth

Gonionota excavata is a moth in the family Depressariidae. It was described by Clarke in 1964. It is found in Mexico.

The wingspan is about 22 mm. The forewings are light brown shaded with fuscous costad and with a faint violaceous tinge in the tornal area. The basal patch is buff yellow mixed with reddish ocherous, extending to two-fifths. The costal margin of the basal patch is broadly edged with ground color for nearly its entire length. In the cell, at the outer edge of the basal patch, is a blackish spot and there are several reddish ocherous blotches in the center of the wing. At the apical third, the costa is excised and bordered with white. There is a series of white scale patches around the termen, preceded by ill-defined fuscous spots and the dorsal margin is edged with fuscous and with a group of blackish scales at the base of the dorsum. The hindwings are ocherous white shading to brownish ocherous apically. In the anal area, there are scattered fuscous scales.
