= Gonionota contrasta =

Scientific classification
- Domain: Eukaryota
- Kingdom: Animalia
- Phylum: Arthropoda
- Class: Insecta
- Order: Lepidoptera
- Family: Depressariidae
- Genus: Gonionota
- Species: G. contrasta

Binomial name
- Gonionota contrasta Clarke, 1964

Species of moth

Gonionota contrasta is a moth in the family Depressariidae. It was described by Clarke in 1964. It is found in Peru.

The wingspan is 19–21 mm. The forewings are sayal brown blotched and suffused with fuscous. From the base of the wing, a broad, elongate, oblique reddish ocherous blotch, mixed with buff yellow, nearly reaches the costa and is separated from a smaller similarly colored outwardly oblique patch by an arm of ground color. In the outer patch, which extends to the cell, are two blackish spots. In the cell, at two-fifths, is a black spot and at the end of the cell is a small white dot and at the apical third of the costa is an elongate triangular white spot edged with pink along the inner margin. Beyond this spot are a few whitish scales. The hindwings are fuscous.
