= Gonionota ustimacula =

Scientific classification
- Kingdom: Animalia
- Phylum: Arthropoda
- Clade: Pancrustacea
- Class: Insecta
- Order: Lepidoptera
- Family: Depressariidae
- Genus: Gonionota
- Species: G. ustimacula

Binomial name
- Gonionota ustimacula (Zeller, 1874)

Synonyms
- Cryptolechia ustimacula Zeller, 1874; Callistenoma ustimacula var. zelleri Butler, 1883

Species of moth

Gonionota ustimacula is a moth in the family Depressariidae. It was described by Philipp Christoph Zeller in 1874. It is found in Chile.

The wingspan is about 26 mm. The variety zelleri differs from the typical form in having a rounded grey spot upon the disc of the forewings below the cuneiform costal patch, to which it is united by a pale yellowish nebula. There is also an arched externo-discal series of dark grey spots, the uppermost of the series partly yellow and joining the inferior angle of the cuneiform patch. The hindwings are shining bronze brown instead of white.
