= Gonionota praeclivis =

Scientific classification
- Kingdom: Animalia
- Phylum: Arthropoda
- Clade: Pancrustacea
- Class: Insecta
- Order: Lepidoptera
- Family: Depressariidae
- Genus: Gonionota
- Species: G. praeclivis

Binomial name
- Gonionota praeclivis (Meyrick, 1921)

Synonyms
- Hypercallia praeclivis Meyrick, 1921

Species of moth

Gonionota praeclivis is a moth in the family Depressariidae. It was described by Edward Meyrick in 1921. It is found in Peru.

The wingspan is about 16 mm. The forewings are reddish fuscous with a suffused dark fuscous streak along the dorsum from one-fourth to two-thirds. The second discal stigma is small and white and there is a slight very oblique whitish mark on the costa at two-thirds. The hindwings are dark grey.
