= Gonionota captans =

Scientific classification
- Kingdom: Animalia
- Phylum: Arthropoda
- Class: Insecta
- Order: Lepidoptera
- Family: Depressariidae
- Genus: Gonionota
- Species: G. captans

Binomial name
- Gonionota captans (Meyrick, 1931)

Synonyms
- Hypercallia captans Meyrick, 1931

Species of moth

Gonionota captans is a moth in the family Depressariidae. It was described by Edward Meyrick in 1931. It is found in Brazil.
