= Gonionota eurydryas =

Scientific classification
- Kingdom: Animalia
- Phylum: Arthropoda
- Class: Insecta
- Order: Lepidoptera
- Family: Depressariidae
- Genus: Gonionota
- Species: G. eurydryas

Binomial name
- Gonionota eurydryas (Meyrick, 1926)

Synonyms
- Hypercallia eurydryas Meyrick, 1926

Species of moth

Gonionota eurydryas is a moth in the family Depressariidae. It was described by Edward Meyrick in 1926. It is found in Brazil and Colombia.

The wingspan is about 17 mm. The forewings are brown, with a faint purplish tinge, speckled grey, crossed by indistinct paler transverse striae, towards the anterior half of the costa suffused darker, the posterior half of the costa and termen speckled white. The discal stigmata are small and dark fuscous and there is a short oblique mark of white irroration from the costa before the middle, and a white mark on the costal edge at the beginning of the white irroration, the costa between these darker brown. There is a dark brown mark on the costal edge at three-fourths. The hindwings are greyish ochreous.
