= Gonionota erotopis =

Scientific classification
- Kingdom: Animalia
- Phylum: Arthropoda
- Class: Insecta
- Order: Lepidoptera
- Family: Depressariidae
- Genus: Gonionota
- Species: G. erotopis

Binomial name
- Gonionota erotopis (Meyrick, 1926)

Synonyms
- Hypercallia erotopis Meyrick, 1926

Species of moth

Gonionota erotopis is a moth in the family Depressariidae. It was described by Edward Meyrick in 1926.

It is found in Bolivia.

The wingspan is about 21 mm. The forewings are yellow, more or less nearly wholly suffused rosy crimson, the ground colour only appearing as obscure reticulation in the disc. The extreme costal edge is white about two-fifths and three-fourths, fuscous between these and anteriorly. The stigmata are very small and blackish, the first discal surrounded with yellow, the plical obliquely beyond the first discal, a greyish line from above the middle of the disc passing between these to the dorsum at one-third. There are two irregularly sinuate-curved transverse series of cloudy dark grey dots between the cell and termen, the veins in this area broadly suffused light ochreous brownish. The hindwings are pale ochreous rosy, the base tinged whitish.
