= Gonionota leucoporpa =

Scientific classification
- Kingdom: Animalia
- Phylum: Arthropoda
- Class: Insecta
- Order: Lepidoptera
- Family: Depressariidae
- Genus: Gonionota
- Species: G. leucoporpa

Binomial name
- Gonionota leucoporpa (Meyrick, 1926)

Synonyms
- Hypercallia leucoporpa Meyrick, 1926

Species of moth

Gonionota leucoporpa is a moth in the family Depressariidae. It was described by Edward Meyrick in 1926. It is found in Colombia and Venezuela.

The wingspan is about 22 mm. The forewings are purplish brown with a light ochreous basal patch, the edge running from the costa at two-fifths to the dorsum at one-third, a white transverse-linear mark adjoining this in the disc. A white line is found along the costal edge from the middle to the apex, slightly edged with orange suffusion beneath, the ground colour tinged ochreous towards this and towards the apex. There is also a small purplish-fuscous spot on the end of the cell. The hindwings are light grey, near the termen sprinkled darker grey.
