= Gonionota oligarcha =

Scientific classification
- Kingdom: Animalia
- Phylum: Arthropoda
- Class: Insecta
- Order: Lepidoptera
- Family: Depressariidae
- Genus: Gonionota
- Species: G. oligarcha

Binomial name
- Gonionota oligarcha (Meyrick, 1913)

Synonyms
- Coptotelia oligarcha Meyrick, 1913

Species of moth

Gonionota oligarcha is a moth in the family Depressariidae. It was described by Edward Meyrick in 1913. It is found in Peru.

The wingspan is about 21 mm. The forewings are pinkish brown, irregularly mixed with dark grey and with the costa narrowly suffused with ochreous yellowish except towards the base, the costal edge is fuscous towards the base, whitish posteriorly. The stigmata are blackish, the plical beyond the first discal, the second discal placed in a round rosy-pink spot. There is a curved row of small blackish-grey spots partly suffused and confluent near the termen, and a terminal series of cloudy blackish dots. The hindwings are dark grey.
