= Gonionota isophylla =

Scientific classification
- Kingdom: Animalia
- Phylum: Arthropoda
- Class: Insecta
- Order: Lepidoptera
- Family: Depressariidae
- Genus: Gonionota
- Species: G. isophylla

Binomial name
- Gonionota isophylla Meyrick, 1909

Species of moth

Gonionota isophylla is a moth in the family Depressariidae. It was described by Edward Meyrick in 1909. It is found in Peru and Paraguay.

The wingspan is about 22 mm. The forewings are yellowish crimson rosy with the extreme costal edge white and with a broad suffused light yellow patch extending along the costa from before the middle to near the apex, indistinctly spotted with pale fuscous suffusion. There are two or three very undefined black dots on the termen beneath the apex. The hindwings are light reddish grey.
