= Gonionota hypoleuca =

Scientific classification
- Domain: Eukaryota
- Kingdom: Animalia
- Phylum: Arthropoda
- Class: Insecta
- Order: Lepidoptera
- Family: Depressariidae
- Genus: Gonionota
- Species: G. hypoleuca

Binomial name
- Gonionota hypoleuca J. F. G. Clarke, 1971

Species of moth

Gonionota hypoleuca is a moth in the family Depressariidae. It was described by John Frederick Gates Clarke in 1971. It is found in Venezuela.

The wingspan is 16–22 mm. The forewings are snuff brown, many of the scales tipped whitish. From the basal third of the costa a very faint, ill-defined white line, interrupted in cell by a fuscous spot, extends to the fold and the tornus has an ill-defined fuscous blotch. The hindwings are sepia.
