= Gonionota festicola =

Scientific classification
- Kingdom: Animalia
- Phylum: Arthropoda
- Class: Insecta
- Order: Lepidoptera
- Family: Depressariidae
- Genus: Gonionota
- Species: G. festicola

Binomial name
- Gonionota festicola (Meyrick, 1924)

Synonyms
- Hypercallia festicola Meyrick, 1924

Species of moth

Gonionota festicola is a moth in the family Depressariidae. It was described by Edward Meyrick in 1924. It is found in Peru.

The wingspan is about 24 mm. The forewings are brown, irregularly mixed with dark fuscous irroration, especially in the cell and towards the termen. There are small white spots on the costa before the middle and at three-fourths, the lower part yellow edged crimson, the first with a crimson and yellow spot attached beneath. There is an oblique yellow fasciate blotch reticulated crimson extending from the basal portion of the dorsum to the disc at one-third, where it includes a black dot (the first discal stigma) surrounded yellow and circled crimson. The second discal stigma is smaller, black, and placed in the lower part of a roundish yellow spot with the anterior half mostly crimson. There are some irregular crimson markings towards the fold on the median area and a small crimson spot in the disc at five-sixths, as well as two or three faint yellowish and crimson dots before the termen towards the middle. The hindwings are whitish, tinged greyish ochreous on the apical third.
