= Gonionota anelicta =

Scientific classification
- Kingdom: Animalia
- Phylum: Arthropoda
- Clade: Pancrustacea
- Class: Insecta
- Order: Lepidoptera
- Family: Depressariidae
- Genus: Gonionota
- Species: G. anelicta

Binomial name
- Gonionota anelicta (Meyrick, 1926)

Synonyms
- Hypercallia anelicta Meyrick, 1926

Species of moth

Gonionota anelicta is a moth in the family Depressariidae. It was described by Edward Meyrick in 1926. It is found in Bolivia.

The wingspan is about 16 mm. The forewings are brown, with a slight rosy tinge and a white dot on the costa at two-fifths, edged anteriorly by dark grey suffusion and followed by a short indistinct somewhat oblique streak of grey suffusion, the recurved portion of the costa also dark grey. There is a small white spot on the costa at two-thirds, the costal edge preceding this shortly white to meet the recurved portion. The first discal stigma is indistinctly grey, the second white. The hindwings are dark grey.
