= Gonionota amphicrena =

Scientific classification
- Kingdom: Animalia
- Phylum: Arthropoda
- Class: Insecta
- Order: Lepidoptera
- Family: Depressariidae
- Genus: Gonionota
- Species: G. amphicrena

Binomial name
- Gonionota amphicrena (Meyrick, 1912)

Synonyms
- Coptotelia amphicrena Meyrick, 1912

Species of moth

Gonionota amphicrena is a moth in the family Depressariidae. It was described by Edward Meyrick in 1912. It is found in Colombia.

The wingspan is about 19 mm. The forewings are bronzy-brown with the discal stigmata dark fuscous and with a small white spot on the costa before the middle, and another semioval in the sinuation midway between the first and the apex. There is a curved row of dark fuscous dots crossing the wing from the second costal spot to near the dorsum before the tornus. The hindwings are whitish, suffused with very pale brownish towards the apex.
