= Gonionota teganitis =

Scientific classification
- Kingdom: Animalia
- Phylum: Arthropoda
- Class: Insecta
- Order: Lepidoptera
- Family: Depressariidae
- Genus: Gonionota
- Species: G. teganitis

Binomial name
- Gonionota teganitis Meyrick, 1909

Species of moth

Gonionota teganitis is a moth in the family Depressariidae. It was described by Edward Meyrick in 1909. It is found in Peru.

The wingspan is 17–18 mm. The forewings are dark reddish brown with the costal edge dull reddish on the basal two-fifths and a very small carmine-white mark on the costa at two-fifths, the extreme costal edge between this and the sinuation dark fuscous. There is a wedge-shaped white spot on the costal sinuation, edged anteriorly with carmine red. The hindwings are dark fuscous.
