= Gonionota dryodesma =

Scientific classification
- Kingdom: Animalia
- Phylum: Arthropoda
- Class: Insecta
- Order: Lepidoptera
- Family: Depressariidae
- Genus: Gonionota
- Species: G. dryodesma

Binomial name
- Gonionota dryodesma (Meyrick, 1916)

Synonyms
- Hypercallia dryodesma Meyrick, 1916; Hypercallia dryocrypta Meyrick, 1931

Species of moth

Gonionota dryodesma is a moth in the family Depressariidae. It was described by Edward Meyrick in 1916. It is found in Guatemala, Costa Rica, Venezuela and French Guiana.

The wingspan is about 15 mm. The forewings are yellow, reticulated throughout with ferruginous red. There is a purple-fuscous streak along the costa throughout, darkest on the costal edge, interrupted by oblique strigulae of ground colour at two-fifths and three-fourths. There is a broad purplish-brown median transverse fascia, considerably dilated on the dorsum. The discal stigmata are placed on the margins of this, they are blackish, the first minute and the second rather large. There is also a curved series of cloudy dark fuscous dots rising from this fascia near the costa and returning to it near the dorsum and there is a purple-brown streak along the termen. The hindwings are whitish yellowish.
