= Gonionota erythroleuca =

Scientific classification
- Kingdom: Animalia
- Phylum: Arthropoda
- Class: Insecta
- Order: Lepidoptera
- Family: Depressariidae
- Genus: Gonionota
- Species: G. erythroleuca

Binomial name
- Gonionota erythroleuca (Meyrick, 1928)

Synonyms
- Hypercallia erythroleuca Meyrick, 1928

Species of moth

Gonionota erythroleuca is a moth in the family Depressariidae. It was described by Edward Meyrick in 1928. It is found in Peru.

The wingspan is 28–31 mm. The forewings are rather dark brown with some crimson-ochreous suffusion towards the base of the dorsum and with small triangular white costal spots at two-fifths and on the postmedian sinuation. The first discal stigma is crimson, the second white, with a spot of crimson suffusion adjacent the above, and followed by a patch of crimson suffusion extending to near the costa. There is an obscure subterminal line of dark fuscous suffusion. The hindwings are light ochreous grey.
