= Gonionota dissita =

Scientific classification
- Domain: Eukaryota
- Kingdom: Animalia
- Phylum: Arthropoda
- Class: Insecta
- Order: Lepidoptera
- Family: Depressariidae
- Genus: Gonionota
- Species: G. dissita

Binomial name
- Gonionota dissita Clarke, 1964

Species of moth

Gonionota dissita is a moth in the family Depressariidae. It was described by Clarke in 1964. It is found in Trinidad.

The wingspan is 20–22 mm. The forewings are brown, blotched dorsally with fuscous. The base, to two-fifths of the costa and the dorsal fourth are buff yellow strongly mixed with reddish ochreous and the outer margin of the basal patch is irregularly oblique, the costal margin shaded with brown. From the costal two-fifths an oblique, narrow blotch, the same color as the basal patch, extends to the end of the cell and terminates in a small white dot. The basal and outer light areas are separated by an arm of ground color. In the cell, at about two-fifths, a fuscous spot is found and there is an indistinct row of fuscous spots parallel to termen from the costa to the tornus, at about the outer fifth. At the apical fourth, on the costa, a prominent, narrow triangular white streak bordered on its inner margin with reddish ocherous and followed by white scaling, runs to the apex. The hindwings are brownish but much paler basally.
