= Gonionota cyanaspis =

Scientific classification
- Kingdom: Animalia
- Phylum: Arthropoda
- Class: Insecta
- Order: Lepidoptera
- Family: Depressariidae
- Genus: Gonionota
- Species: G. cyanaspis

Binomial name
- Gonionota cyanaspis (Meyrick, 1909)

Synonyms
- Doleromima cyanaspis Meyrick, 1909

Species of moth

Gonionota cyanaspis is a moth in the family Depressariidae. It was described by Edward Meyrick in 1909. It is found in Peru.

The wingspan is 23–24 mm. The forewings are bright deep orange with two deep blue oblique fasciae edged with purple, not quite reaching the dorsal edge, the first moderate, near the base, the second broad, median, expanded in the disc so that the posterior edge is convex. There is a series of longitudinal purple-black marks terminating in the posterior third of the costa and termen, becoming shorter towards the ends of the series. The hindwings are deep orange with an irregular-edged purple-blackish blotch occupying the basal half. There is a row of black subquadrate spots around the apex and termen.
