= Gonionota mimulina =

Scientific classification
- Kingdom: Animalia
- Phylum: Arthropoda
- Class: Insecta
- Order: Lepidoptera
- Family: Depressariidae
- Genus: Gonionota
- Species: G. mimulina

Binomial name
- Gonionota mimulina (Butler, 1883)

Synonyms
- Agriocoma mimulina Butler, 1883; Agriocoma mimulina araucana Bartlett-Calvert, 1893

Species of moth

Gonionota mimulina is a moth in the family Depressariidae. It was described by Arthur Gardiner Butler in 1883. It is found in Chile.

The wingspan is 17–19 mm. The forewings are bright sulphur yellow with a stripe along the base of the costal nervure reddish, spotted with blackish, and joining at basal third the commencement of a broad triangular reddish patch with blackish edges, which extends nearly to the apex, and is spotted on the costal margin and at its inferior angle with white. There is an externo-discal series of minute blackish dots, sometimes obsolete. The hindwings are sericeous (silky) snow white.
