= Gonionota extima =

Scientific classification
- Domain: Eukaryota
- Kingdom: Animalia
- Phylum: Arthropoda
- Class: Insecta
- Order: Lepidoptera
- Family: Depressariidae
- Genus: Gonionota
- Species: G. extima

Binomial name
- Gonionota extima Clarke, 1964

Species of moth

Gonionota extima is a moth in the family Depressariidae. It was described by Clarke in 1964. It is found in Costa Rica.

The wingspan is about 22 mm. The forewings are sayal brown with the basal patch buff yellow mixed with reddish ocherous and irrorated with blackish fuscous, from the basal third of the costa outwardly oblique to the middle of the cell, then inwardly oblique to the basal fourth of the dorsum. The costal part of the basal patch is broadly suffused sayal brown. In the basal patch, near the outer margin, are two black discal spots and at the end of the cell is a white dot followed by a few black scales. The fold is conspicuously indicated by black scales and the dorsum is broadly suffused fuscous with a purplish tinge. There is a prominent white triangular spot at the apical fourth of the costa, followed outwardly and obliquely toward the termen by a series of irregular, alternating white and blackish spots. The hindwings are clay color with conspicuous fuscous scaling in the anal area.
