= Gonionota rosacea =

Scientific classification
- Kingdom: Animalia
- Phylum: Arthropoda
- Clade: Pancrustacea
- Class: Insecta
- Order: Lepidoptera
- Family: Depressariidae
- Genus: Gonionota
- Species: G. rosacea

Binomial name
- Gonionota rosacea (Forbes, 1931)

Synonyms
- Hypercallia rosacea Forbes, 1931

Species of moth

Gonionota rosacea is a moth in the family Depressariidae. It was described by William Trowbridge Merrifield Forbes in 1931. It is found in Haiti, Cuba and the Dominican Republic.
