= Gonionota bourquiniella =

Scientific classification
- Domain: Eukaryota
- Kingdom: Animalia
- Phylum: Arthropoda
- Class: Insecta
- Order: Lepidoptera
- Family: Depressariidae
- Genus: Gonionota
- Species: G. bourquiniella

Binomial name
- Gonionota bourquiniella (Köhler, 1939)

Synonyms
- Hypercallia bourquiniella Köhler, 1939

Species of moth

Gonionota bourquiniella is a moth in the family Depressariidae. It was described by Paul Köhler in 1939. It is found in Argentina.
