= Gonionota bourquini =

Scientific classification
- Domain: Eukaryota
- Kingdom: Animalia
- Phylum: Arthropoda
- Class: Insecta
- Order: Lepidoptera
- Family: Depressariidae
- Genus: Gonionota
- Species: G. bourquini

Binomial name
- Gonionota bourquini Clarke, 1964

Species of moth

Gonionota bourquini is a moth in the family Depressariidae. It was described by Clarke in 1964. It is found in Brazil and Argentina.

The wingspan is 16–24 mm. The forewings are light brown with slight pinkish cast and with some ill-defined fuscous blotches. The base of the forewing is buff yellow, with the outer edge lobed obliquely to the costa at one-third. There is an outwardly oblique blotch of the same color separated from the basal patch by an arm of the ground color and the costal edge of the light basal patch is brownish ochreous, while the basal patch and costal blotch are overlaid with reddish ocherous and sparsely irrorated with scattered jet black scales. The outer third of the costa is broadly edged with white, pink, and fuscous scales intermixed. At the end of the cell is a tiny white spot and there is a series of blackish spots around the termen. The hindwings are buff to ocherous fuscous, with the veins outlined darker and the anal area with darker scaling parallel to the first anal vein.

== Etymology ==
The species is named in honour of Fernando Bourquin.
