= Gonionota menura =

Scientific classification
- Domain: Eukaryota
- Kingdom: Animalia
- Phylum: Arthropoda
- Class: Insecta
- Order: Lepidoptera
- Family: Depressariidae
- Genus: Gonionota
- Species: G. menura

Binomial name
- Gonionota menura J. F. G. Clarke, 1971

Species of moth

Gonionota menura is a moth in the family Depressariidae. It was described by John Frederick Gates Clarke in 1971. It is found in Panama.

The wingspan is about 24 mm. The forewings are amber brown with the basal third faintly blotched with carmine. Slightly before the middle of the costa is a small, ocherous-white, quadrate spot edged with carmine and at the outer third the costa is excavated and bordered with a white, carmine-edged, lunate mark. The remainder of the costa is very narrowly edged fuscous. In the cell at the basal third is a fuscous spot surrounded by a few carmine scales. The discal spot at the end of the cell is obsolete and between the end of the cell and termen is an ill-defined, transverse row of fuscous spots. The hindwings are ocherous white basally, shading to brown at the apex.
