= Gonionota incisa =

Scientific classification
- Kingdom: Animalia
- Phylum: Arthropoda
- Clade: Pancrustacea
- Class: Insecta
- Order: Lepidoptera
- Family: Depressariidae
- Genus: Gonionota
- Species: G. incisa

Binomial name
- Gonionota incisa Meyrick, 1909

Species of moth

Gonionota incisa is a moth in the family Depressariidae. It was described by Edward Meyrick in 1909. It is found in Bolivia.

The wingspan is 18–19 mm. The forewings are dark purplish fuscous, somewhat mixed with deep ferruginous and with some irregular partly confluent striae on the anterior half of the wing, two lines along the posterior part of the fold, and an almost terminal stria formed by undefined whitish-yellowish irroration. The hindwings are dark fuscous.
