= Gonionota transversa =

Scientific classification
- Domain: Eukaryota
- Kingdom: Animalia
- Phylum: Arthropoda
- Class: Insecta
- Order: Lepidoptera
- Family: Depressariidae
- Genus: Gonionota
- Species: G. transversa

Binomial name
- Gonionota transversa J. F. G. Clarke, 1971

Species of moth

Gonionota transversa is a moth in the family Depressariidae. It was described by John Frederick Gates Clarke in 1971. It is found in Paraná, Brazil.

The wingspan is 17–19 mm. The forewings are dresden brown with the basal third of the wing, except a rectangular patch of ground color on the costa, buff, mixed with ocheraceous orange and fuscous. The outer third of the wing is buff, but this color is nearly obscured by darker blotches and irrorations (speckles). On the costa, at the apical third, is a buff spot and in the cell, at one third, a pair of small fuscous discal spots. At the end of the cell is a similar, but smaller, spot. The hindwings are ocherous white, slightly darker toward the margins.
