= Gonionota isastra =

Scientific classification
- Kingdom: Animalia
- Phylum: Arthropoda
- Class: Insecta
- Order: Lepidoptera
- Family: Depressariidae
- Genus: Gonionota
- Species: G. isastra

Binomial name
- Gonionota isastra (Meyrick, 1926)

Synonyms
- Hypercallia isastra Meyrick, 1926

Species of moth

Gonionota isastra is a moth in the family Depressariidae. It was described by Edward Meyrick in 1926. It is found in Colombia.

The wingspan is 27–28 mm. The forewings are brown, faintly rosy tinged, with a few scattered dark fuscous scales. The stigmata are small and dark fuscous, the first discal sometimes edged anteriorly by a small whitish dot, the plical obliquely beyond this. Small white subtriangular spots are found on the costa at two-fifths and two-thirds, the edge between these sometimes rosy. There is also an angulated series of indistinct dots of dark fuscous irroration from the second of these to the dorsum near the tornus. There is a terminal series of dark fuscous marks, sometimes nearly obsolete. The hindwings are ochreous whitish, very faintly pinkish tinged, sometimes tinged pale ochreous grey posteriorly.
