= Gonionota hemiglypta =

Scientific classification
- Domain: Eukaryota
- Kingdom: Animalia
- Phylum: Arthropoda
- Class: Insecta
- Order: Lepidoptera
- Family: Depressariidae
- Genus: Gonionota
- Species: G. hemiglypta

Binomial name
- Gonionota hemiglypta J. F. G. Clarke, 1971

Species of moth

Gonionota hemiglypta is a moth in the family Depressariidae. It was described by John Frederick Gates Clarke in 1971. It is found in Santa Catarina, Brazil.

The wingspan is 17–21 mm. The forewings are yellow with the dorsal half strongly overlaid carmine. The costal half is ferruginous at the base, this color becoming attenuated toward the apex. The extreme costal edge is narrowly whitish and at the basal third, in the cell, is a small black dot followed at the end of the cell by a similar dot. The hindwings are ocheraceous tawny.
