= Gonionota satrapis =

Scientific classification
- Kingdom: Animalia
- Phylum: Arthropoda
- Class: Insecta
- Order: Lepidoptera
- Family: Depressariidae
- Genus: Gonionota
- Species: G. satrapis

Binomial name
- Gonionota satrapis (Meyrick, 1914)

Synonyms
- Hypercallia satrapis Meyrick, 1914

Species of moth

Gonionota satrapis is a moth in the family Depressariidae. It was described by Edward Meyrick in 1914. It is found in Colombia.

The wingspan is 18–19 mm. The forewings are yellow, suffusedly reticulated with crimson. The discal stigmata are represented by moderate round pale yellow dots, the second whitish tinged. There is a rather dark fuscous fascia from the middle of the costa to the dorsum before the middle, narrow on the costa but considerably dilated posteriorly towards the dorsum, adjoining the first discal stigma and connected by a projection with the second. There is an irregular fuscous tornal patch, reaching to the second discal stigma, and connected by an irregular line with the costal extremity of the fascia, the dorsal half of the wing between this and the fascia suffused with crimson. The hindwings are yellow whitish.
