= Gonionota oxybela =

Scientific classification
- Domain: Eukaryota
- Kingdom: Animalia
- Phylum: Arthropoda
- Class: Insecta
- Order: Lepidoptera
- Family: Depressariidae
- Genus: Gonionota
- Species: G. oxybela

Binomial name
- Gonionota oxybela J. F. G. Clarke, 1971

Species of moth

Gonionota oxybela is a moth in the family Depressariidae. It was described by John Frederick Gates Clarke in 1971. It is found in Peru.

The wingspan is 18–20 mm. The forewings are bister brown with tawny-olive irroration (sprinkles) and in the outer half of the wing considerable ochraceous-tawny scaling. The costa is ochraceous tawny mixed with tawny olive and from the basal third of the costa an ill-defined tawny-olive line extends to the fold where it continues outwardly to the tornus. The hindwings are sepia.
