= Gonionota hydrogramma =

Scientific classification
- Kingdom: Animalia
- Phylum: Arthropoda
- Class: Insecta
- Order: Lepidoptera
- Family: Depressariidae
- Genus: Gonionota
- Species: G. hydrogramma

Binomial name
- Gonionota hydrogramma (Meyrick, 1912)

Synonyms
- Coptotelia hydrogramma Meyrick, 1912

Species of moth

Gonionota hydrogramma is a moth in the family Depressariidae. It was described by Edward Meyrick in 1912. It is found in Colombia.

The wingspan is 21–22 mm. The forewings are brown, with irregular pale transverse striae and with the posterior two-thirds of the costal edge rosy slightly tipped with white cilia, with a small oblique rosy mark at two-fifths and another mixed with white at four-fifths. The first discal stigma is blackish, the plical minute and blackish, rather beyond it, the second discal is represented by a minute transverse linear white mark and there is a dark brown dorsal streak from one-third to near the tornus, attenuated posteriorly, edged above with rosy-pinkish suffusion. There is also some indistinct blackish irroration towards the termen, tending to form subterminal and terminal series of spots. The hindwings are dark grey.
