= Gonionota euthyrsa =

Scientific classification
- Kingdom: Animalia
- Phylum: Arthropoda
- Class: Insecta
- Order: Lepidoptera
- Family: Depressariidae
- Genus: Gonionota
- Species: G. euthyrsa

Binomial name
- Gonionota euthyrsa (Meyrick, 1930)

Synonyms
- Hypercallia euthyrsa Meyrick, 1930

Species of moth

Gonionota euthyrsa is a moth in the family Depressariidae. It was described by Edward Meyrick in 1930. It is found in Ecuador.

== Description ==
The moth's wingspan is 21–22 mm.
