= Gonionota mitis =

Scientific classification
- Kingdom: Animalia
- Phylum: Arthropoda
- Class: Insecta
- Order: Lepidoptera
- Family: Depressariidae
- Genus: Gonionota
- Species: G. mitis

Binomial name
- Gonionota mitis (Meyrick, 1914)

Synonyms
- Hypercallia mitis Meyrick, 1914

Species of moth

Gonionota mitis is a moth in the family Depressariidae. It was described by Edward Meyrick in 1914. It is found in Peru.

The wingspan is about 18 mm. The forewings are light ferruginous brownish, posteriorly deeper and becoming dark ferruginous fuscous on the costal half, the costal edge dark fuscous and with an oblique yellowish transverse blotch from the costa before the middle, reaching half across the wing, cut obliquely by a ferruginous line. There is a fine whitish line along the costa from the middle to near three-fourths, and a patch of whitish irroration near beyond this, where a series of several indistinct whitish dots runs towards the tornus. The hindwings are light yellow ochreous, suffused with greyish fulvous towards the apex.
