= Gonionota gaiophanes =

Scientific classification
- Domain: Eukaryota
- Kingdom: Animalia
- Phylum: Arthropoda
- Class: Insecta
- Order: Lepidoptera
- Family: Depressariidae
- Genus: Gonionota
- Species: G. gaiophanes

Binomial name
- Gonionota gaiophanes J. F. G. Clarke, 1971

Species of moth

Gonionota gaiophanes is a moth in the family Depressariidae. It was described by John Frederick Gates Clarke in 1971. It is found in Brazil.

The wingspan is about 21 mm. The forewings are clay color, strongly overlaid with sayal brown and weakly mottled with fuscous. In the tornal area is an ill-defined fuscous blotch and on the termen from the apex to the tornus, are six fuscous transverse dashes. The basal third to the apical third of the costa is narrowly yellowish. The hindwings are pale clay color with a conspicuous fuscous shade between the 2nd and 3rd anals.
