= Gonionota confinella =

Scientific classification
- Domain: Eukaryota
- Kingdom: Animalia
- Phylum: Arthropoda
- Class: Insecta
- Order: Lepidoptera
- Family: Depressariidae
- Genus: Gonionota
- Species: G. confinella

Binomial name
- Gonionota confinella (Felder & Rogenhofer, 1875)

Synonyms
- Hypercallia confinella Felder & Rogenhofer, 1875

Species of moth

Gonionota confinella is a moth in the family Depressariidae. It was described by Cajetan Felder, Rudolf Felder and Alois Friedrich Rogenhofer in 1875. It is found in Colombia.
