= Gonionota argopleura =

Scientific classification
- Domain: Eukaryota
- Kingdom: Animalia
- Phylum: Arthropoda
- Class: Insecta
- Order: Lepidoptera
- Family: Depressariidae
- Genus: Gonionota
- Species: G. argopleura

Binomial name
- Gonionota argopleura J. F. G. Clarke, 1971

Species of moth

Gonionota argopleura is a moth in the family Depressariidae. It was described by John Frederick Gates Clarke in 1971. It is found in Santa Catarina, Brazil.

The wingspan is about 22 mm. The forewings are fawn with the basal half of the costa white, shading to grey, then merging with the ground colour. The apical third of the costa is white with a dark brown spot near the inner end. There is a large ochraceous-buff blotch between veins 4 and 7 on the termen and in the cell, at the basal two fifths, is an ill-defined dark grey spot. There is also a dark brown shade on the mid-dorsum. The hindwings are buff basally, shading to olive buff towards the margins.
