= Gonionota acrocosma =

Scientific classification
- Kingdom: Animalia
- Phylum: Arthropoda
- Class: Insecta
- Order: Lepidoptera
- Family: Depressariidae
- Genus: Gonionota
- Species: G. acrocosma

Binomial name
- Gonionota acrocosma (Meyrick, 1912)

Synonyms
- Coptotelia acrocosma Meyrick, 1912

Species of moth

Gonionota acrocosma is a moth in the family Depressariidae. It was described by Edward Meyrick in 1912. It is found in Colombia.

The wingspan is about 19 mm. The forewings are deep purplish brown with the basal third lighter brown, the outer edge straight, inwardly oblique, the costal edge pinkish. The dorsum beyond this is darker suffused and the first discal stigma is represented by a few white scales, the second by a few dark fuscous and whitish. The costal edge towards the middle is dark fuscous, posteriorly suffused with ferruginous yellow tipped with rose pink. The hindwings are grey.
