= Gonionota hyptiotes =

Scientific classification
- Domain: Eukaryota
- Kingdom: Animalia
- Phylum: Arthropoda
- Class: Insecta
- Order: Lepidoptera
- Family: Depressariidae
- Genus: Gonionota
- Species: G. hyptiotes

Binomial name
- Gonionota hyptiotes Clarke, 1964

Species of moth

Gonionota hyptiotes is a moth in the family Depressariidae. It was described by Clarke in 1964. It is found in Mexico.

The wingspan is about 24 mm. The forewings are buckthorn brown with the basal fifth to the costal edge of the cell at two-fifths dull ochreous. From two-fifths of the costa, a transverse bar of dull ocherous extends toward the outer extremity of the basal patch but is interrupted by ground color. The basal patch is divided at the middle by a transverse line of ground color. On the outer margin of the basal patch, in the cell, two small clusters of fuscous scales are found. At the end of the cell, a fuscous spot is surrounded by ochreous and the costa is deeply excised at the outer third, edged with white. The inner margin of the white edge is very narrowly ochreous and the costa is fuscous before and after the white-edged excision. The dorsum is broadly edged with fuscous. In the terminal third scattered, ill-defined fuscous spots are found. The hindwings are ocherous white basally, shading to brown apically. Considerable greyish fuscous scaling is found in the anal area.
