= Gonionota periphereia =

Scientific classification
- Kingdom: Animalia
- Phylum: Arthropoda
- Clade: Pancrustacea
- Class: Insecta
- Order: Lepidoptera
- Family: Depressariidae
- Genus: Gonionota
- Species: G. periphereia

Binomial name
- Gonionota periphereia Clarke, 1964

Species of moth

Gonionota periphereia is a moth in the family Depressariidae. It was described by Clarke in 1964. It is found in Ecuador.

The wingspan is about 20 mm. The forewings are sayal brown shading to russet in the apical third. There is an outwardly oblique band of buff yellow crossed by transverse brown bars and marked with ill-defined reddish ocherous spots from the basal fifth, to about the middle of the costa. The extreme edge of the basal third of the costa is brown. On the costa, beyond the basal patch, is a triangular group of black scales and on the apical fourth of the costa is a buff yellow quadrate spot containing some reddish ocherous scales. The hindwings are ocherous white, somewhat darker toward the apex.
