= Gonionota incontigua =

Scientific classification
- Domain: Eukaryota
- Kingdom: Animalia
- Phylum: Arthropoda
- Class: Insecta
- Order: Lepidoptera
- Family: Depressariidae
- Genus: Gonionota
- Species: G. incontigua

Binomial name
- Gonionota incontigua Clarke, 1964

Species of moth

Gonionota incontigua is a moth in the family Depressariidae. It was described by Clarke in 1964. It is found in Venezuela.

The wingspan is about 26 mm. The forewings are brown strongly suffused with fuscous and with the basal patch buff yellow mixed with reddish ocherous and with several small groups of fuscous scales. The costal edge of the basal patch is brown. From the costa, beyond the basal patch and separated from it by a band of ground color, an outwardly oblique buff yellow and reddish ocherous blotch extends to the end of the cell, where it terminates in a white spot. The surface of the blotch is marked with considerable fuscous scaling. There is a fuscous spot in the cell, beyond the edge of the basal patch and the dorsum is strongly suffused fuscous. At the apical third of the costa is a narrow triangular white dash followed on the apical part of the costa by white scaling and the costal dash is edged inwardly reddish ochreous. Subterminally, greyish scales form ill-defined streaks and spots. The hindwings are ocherous shading to brownish apically.
