= Gonionota intonans =

Scientific classification
- Kingdom: Animalia
- Phylum: Arthropoda
- Class: Insecta
- Order: Lepidoptera
- Family: Depressariidae
- Genus: Gonionota
- Species: G. intonans

Binomial name
- Gonionota intonans (Meyrick, 1933)

Synonyms
- Hypercallia intonans Meyrick, 1933

Species of moth

Gonionota intonans is a moth in the family Depressariidae. It was described by Edward Meyrick in 1933. It is found in Argentina.
