= Gonionota vivida =

Scientific classification
- Kingdom: Animalia
- Phylum: Arthropoda
- Class: Insecta
- Order: Lepidoptera
- Family: Depressariidae
- Genus: Gonionota
- Species: G. vivida

Binomial name
- Gonionota vivida (Meyrick, 1926)

Synonyms
- Hypercallia vivida Meyrick, 1926

Species of moth

Gonionota vivida is a moth in the family Depressariidae. It was described by Edward Meyrick in 1926. It is found in Bolivia.

The wingspan is 17–19 mm. The forewings are bright yellow more or less suffused irregularly rosy orange with the costal edge white except at the base, narrowly suffused clear yellow beneath except towards the middle, more strongly posteriorly. Beneath this, a broad suffused ferruginous-brown band is found from the base to above the middle, occupying nearly the costal half of the wing, beyond this some faint brownish suffusion extends above the middle to near the apex. The discal stigmata are minute and blackish, sometimes obsolete and there is a narrow terminal fascia of ferruginous-brown suffusion. The hindwings are rosy grey or light rosy brownish.
