= Gonionota citronota =

Scientific classification
- Kingdom: Animalia
- Phylum: Arthropoda
- Class: Insecta
- Order: Lepidoptera
- Family: Depressariidae
- Genus: Gonionota
- Species: G. citronota

Binomial name
- Gonionota citronota (Meyrick, 1932)

Synonyms
- Hypercallia citronota Meyrick, 1932

Species of moth

Gonionota citronota is a moth in the family Depressariidae. It was described by Edward Meyrick in 1932. It is found in Brazil.
