= Gonionota insignata =

Scientific classification
- Domain: Eukaryota
- Kingdom: Animalia
- Phylum: Arthropoda
- Class: Insecta
- Order: Lepidoptera
- Family: Depressariidae
- Genus: Gonionota
- Species: G. insignata

Binomial name
- Gonionota insignata J. F. G. Clarke, 1971

Species of moth

Gonionota insignata is a moth in the family Depressariidae. It was described by John Frederick Gates Clarke in 1971. It is found in Ecuador.

The wingspan is 16–18 mm (0.63–0.71 in). The forewings are ochraceous orange irregularly blotched with greyish fuscous, especially on the dorsum. At the basal third, in the cell, is a fuscous spot, largely obscured by the irregular greyish-fuscous blotching and at the end of the cell is a white discal spot. Subterminally, from inside the apex to the tornus, is a series of seven or eight small fuscous spots. There are some scattered white scales on the costa and at the apical third is a pale, wedge-shaped mark preceded by an ill-defined fuscous spot. The hindwings are ochreous white, slightly darker apically.
