= Gonionota phocodes =

Scientific classification
- Kingdom: Animalia
- Phylum: Arthropoda
- Class: Insecta
- Order: Lepidoptera
- Family: Depressariidae
- Genus: Gonionota
- Species: G. phocodes

Binomial name
- Gonionota phocodes Meyrick, 1909

Species of moth

Gonionota phocodes is a moth in the family Depressariidae. It was described by Edward Meyrick in 1909. It is found in Peru.

The wingspan is about 16 millimetres (0.63 in). The forewings are purplish-ferruginous brown with some undefined fine whitish-ochreous irroration, especially towards the costa anteriorly, and on a rather broad fascia from before the middle of the costa to the tornus. The hindwings are dark fuscous, lighter anteriorly.
