= Gonionota persistis =

Scientific classification
- Kingdom: Animalia
- Phylum: Arthropoda
- Class: Insecta
- Order: Lepidoptera
- Family: Depressariidae
- Genus: Gonionota
- Species: G. persistis

Binomial name
- Gonionota persistis (Meyrick, 1914)

Synonyms
- Hypercallia persistis Meyrick, 1914

Species of moth

Gonionota persistis is a moth in the family Depressariidae. It was described by Edward Meyrick in 1914. It is found in Peru.

The wingspan is about 18 mm. The forewings are light yellowish, suffusedly streaked with crimson red on all veins and with a slender crimson-fuscous streak along the costa throughout, continued around the termen to the tornus, the anterior half of the costa more broadly suffused with light fuscous and with a thick streak of light fuscous suffusion from three-fifths of the costa to one-fourth of the dorsum. The discal stigmata are small and dark fuscous and there is a rather curved waved light fuscous transverse line at three-fourths, as well as a similar crimson-red subterminal line. The hindwings are whitish yellowish, yellower along the termen.
