= Gonionota pialea =

Scientific classification
- Kingdom: Animalia
- Phylum: Arthropoda
- Clade: Pancrustacea
- Class: Insecta
- Order: Lepidoptera
- Family: Depressariidae
- Genus: Gonionota
- Species: G. pialea

Binomial name
- Gonionota pialea (Meyrick, 1921)

Synonyms
- Hypercallia pialea Meyrick, 1921

Species of moth

Gonionota pialea is a moth in the family Depressariidae. It was described by Edward Meyrick in 1921. It is found in Brazil (Para).

The wingspan is about 15 mm. The forewings are ferruginous brown with a slightly paler oblique mark from the costa at two-fifths, followed by some rather darker suffusion. There is a fine white very oblique strigula on the costa at three-fourths. The discal stigmata are dark ferruginous fuscous, the first minute and the second rather small. There is also a darker terminal line. The hindwings are dark fuscous.
