= Gonionota insulana =

Scientific classification
- Domain: Eukaryota
- Kingdom: Animalia
- Phylum: Arthropoda
- Class: Insecta
- Order: Lepidoptera
- Family: Depressariidae
- Genus: Gonionota
- Species: G. insulana

Binomial name
- Gonionota insulana Clarke, 1964

Species of moth

Gonionota insulana is a moth in the family Depressariidae. It was described by Clarke in 1964. It is found in on Dominica.

The wingspan is 17–19 mm. The forewings are orange yellow, with the costa to three-fifths russet and the extreme edge narrowly black interrupted by a white streak at two-fifths. On the costa, beyond three-fifths, is an orange yellow spot with the extreme costal edge white. From the basal third to the costal three-fifths, an outwardly oblique, russet band, confluent with the dark costal shade, terminates in a point, the latter confluent with an outwardly curved series of black spots. The terminal area is russet with the two discal stigmata blackish, at one-third in the cell and at the end of the cell. There are scarlet irregular lines and blotches. The hindwings are buff shaded with brown.
