= Gonionota oriphanta =

Scientific classification
- Kingdom: Animalia
- Phylum: Arthropoda
- Class: Insecta
- Order: Lepidoptera
- Family: Depressariidae
- Genus: Gonionota
- Species: G. oriphanta

Binomial name
- Gonionota oriphanta (Meyrick, 1928)

Synonyms
- Hypercallia oriphanta Meyrick, 1928

Species of moth

Gonionota oriphanta is a moth in the family Depressariidae. It was described by Edward Meyrick in 1928. It is found in Colombia.

The wingspan is about 21 mm. The forewings are yellow, irregularly mottled and streaked crimson, especially on the veins. The costal edge is dark fuscous, shortly interrupted with pale yellow at two-fifths and two-thirds and with some fuscous suffusion towards the base of the costa, and two or three suffused dark fuscous marks beyond this. There is a slender oblique dark fuscous streak from one-third of the dorsum to above the middle of the disc, then curved over around the end of the cell to its lower angle, connected above by a quadrate blotch of fuscous suffusion with the median portion of the costa. There is an angulated transverse series of small suffused dark fuscous spots from the costa at three-fifths, towards the dorsum broken inwards to near the middle. There is also a terminal fascia of fuscous suffusion, including a subterminal series of yellow dots. The hindwings are grey whitish.
