= Gonionota paravexillata =

Scientific classification
- Domain: Eukaryota
- Kingdom: Animalia
- Phylum: Arthropoda
- Class: Insecta
- Order: Lepidoptera
- Family: Depressariidae
- Genus: Gonionota
- Species: G. paravexillata

Binomial name
- Gonionota paravexillata J. F. G. Clarke, 1971

Species of moth

Gonionota paravexillata is a moth in the family Depressariidae. It was described by John Frederick Gates Clarke in 1971. It is found in Venezuela.

The wingspan is about 17 mm. The forewings are snuff brown. From the basal third of the costa a broad scarlet fascia curves inwardly and broadens to the base of the wing. The scarlet band is mixed with orange and a few sepia scales across the fold and the fascia is bordered outwardly by an ill-defined sepia line. On the costa, just beyond the apical third, is a sharply defined, small white triangle from which arises an ill-defined, outwardly curved, narrow, sepia fascia which extends to the dorsum at the tornus. At the end of the cell is a small white dot preceded and followed by a few fuscous scales. The dorsum is narrowly edged fuscous. The hindwings are snuff brown, slightly darker toward the apex, buff between the cell and costa.
