= Gonionota autocrena =

Scientific classification
- Kingdom: Animalia
- Phylum: Arthropoda
- Class: Insecta
- Order: Lepidoptera
- Family: Depressariidae
- Genus: Gonionota
- Species: G. autocrena

Binomial name
- Gonionota autocrena (Meyrick, 1930)

Synonyms
- Hypercallia autocrena Meyrick, 1930

Species of moth

Gonionota autocrena is a moth in the family Depressariidae. It was described by Edward Meyrick in 1930. It is found in Brazil (Rio de Janeiro).

The wingspan is about 18 mm. The forewings are ochreous brown, irregularly sprinkled dark grey and with a white dot on the costa at two-fifths, the costal edge between this and the excision roughened with dark grey scales, a triangular dot at the posterior end of the excision. The first discal stigma is small and black, the second minute and white. There is a narrow brown dorsal streak from about one-fourth to two-thirds and a strongly curved series of minute blackish dots from near the costa at three-fourths to the tornus. There are also three or four dots of blackish irroration on the lower part of the termen. The hindwings are whitish grey, becoming light greyish ochreous posteriorly.
