= Gonionota phthiochroma =

Scientific classification
- Domain: Eukaryota
- Kingdom: Animalia
- Phylum: Arthropoda
- Class: Insecta
- Order: Lepidoptera
- Family: Depressariidae
- Genus: Gonionota
- Species: G. phthiochroma

Binomial name
- Gonionota phthiochroma J. F. G. Clarke, 1971

Species of moth

Gonionota phthiochroma is a moth in the family Depressariidae. It was described by John Frederick Gates Clarke in 1971. It is found in Bolivia.

The wingspan is about 23 mm. The costal two fifths of the forewings are ochraceous buff, the dorsal three fifths ochraceous salmon. The extreme edge of the costa is ochreous white. The basal fifth of the wing, inside the costa is ochraceous salmon and ochraceous tawny. In the cell, at the basal third is a minute black spot and a similar one at the end of the cell. The outer half of the wing has a few scattered black scales. The hindwings are ocherous white, slightly darker and with a pink tinge apically.
