= Gonionota =

Scientific classification
- Kingdom: Animalia
- Phylum: Arthropoda
- Clade: Pancrustacea
- Class: Insecta
- Order: Lepidoptera
- Family: Depressariidae
- Subfamily: Depressariinae
- Genus: Gonionota; Zeller, 1877

Synonyms
- Callistenoma Butler, 1883

Genus of moths

Gonionota is a moth genus of the family Depressariidae.

== Species ==
- Gonionota acrocosma (Meyrick, 1912)
- Gonionota aethographa Clarke, 1971
- Gonionota aethoptera Clarke, 1971
- Gonionota amauroptera Clarke, 1971
- Gonionota amphicrena (Meyrick, 1912)
- Gonionota anelicta (Meyrick, 1926)
- Gonionota anisodes (Meyrick, 1916)
- Gonionota argopleura Clarke, 1971
- Gonionota autocrena (Meyrick, 1930)
- Gonionota bourquini Clarke, 1964
- Gonionota bourquiniella (Köhler, 1939)
- Gonionota captans (Meyrick, 1931)
- Gonionota citronota (Meyrick, 1932)
- Gonionota cologramma Clarke, 1971
- Gonionota comastis Meyrick, 1909
- Gonionota confinella (Felder & Rogenhofer, 1875)
- Gonionota constellata (Meyrick, 1912)
- Gonionota contrasta Clarke, 1964
- Gonionota cristata Walsingham, 1912
- Gonionota cyanaspis (Meyrick, 1909)
- Gonionota determinata Clarke, 1964
- Gonionota dissita Clarke, 1964
- Gonionota dryodesma (Meyrick, 1916)
- Gonionota eremia Clarke, 1971
- Gonionota erotopis (Meyrick, 1926)
- Gonionota erythroleuca (Meyrick, 1928)
- Gonionota eurydryas (Meyrick, 1926)
- Gonionota euthyrsa (Meyrick, 1930)
- Gonionota excavata Clarke, 1964
- Gonionota extima Clarke, 1964
- Gonionota festicola (Meyrick, 1924)
- Gonionota fimbriata Clarke, 1964
- Gonionota gaiophanes Clarke, 1971
- Gonionota habristis (Meyrick, 1914)
- Gonionota hemiglypta Clarke, 1971
- Gonionota hydrogramma (Meyrick, 1912)
- Gonionota hypoleuca Clarke, 1971
- Gonionota hyptiotes Clarke, 1964
- Gonionota incalescens (Meyrick, 1914)
- Gonionota incisa Meyrick, 1909
- Gonionota incontigua Clarke, 1964
- Gonionota insignata Clarke, 1971
- Gonionota insulana Clarke, 1968
- Gonionota intonans (Meyrick, 1933)
- Gonionota ioleuca (Meyrick, 1912)
- Gonionota isastra (Meyrick, 1926)
- Gonionota isodryas (Meyrick, 1921)
- Gonionota isophylla Meyrick, 1909
- Gonionota lecithitis (Meyrick, 1912)
- Gonionota leucoporpa (Meyrick, 1926)
- Gonionota lichenista (Meyrick, 1926)
- Gonionota luteola (Felder & Rogenhofer, 1875)
- Gonionota melobaphes Walsingham, 1912
- Gonionota menura Clarke, 1971
- Gonionota militaris (Meyrick, 1914)
- Gonionota mimulina (Butler, 1883)
- Gonionota mitis (Meyrick, 1914)
- Gonionota notodontella (Zeller, 1877)
- Gonionota oligarcha (Meyrick, 1913)
- Gonionota oriphanta (Meyrick, 1928)
- Gonionota oxybela Clarke, 1971
- Gonionota paravexillata Clarke, 1971
- Gonionota periphereia Clarke, 1964
- Gonionota persistis (Meyrick, 1914)
- Gonionota phocodes Meyrick, 1909
- Gonionota phthiochroma Clarke, 1971
- Gonionota pialea (Meyrick, 1921)
- Gonionota poecilia Clarke, 1971
- Gonionota praeclivis (Meyrick, 1921)
- Gonionota prolectans (Meyrick, 1926)
- Gonionota pyrocausta (Meyrick, 1931)
- Gonionota pyrrhotrota (Meyrick, 1932)
- Gonionota rhacina (Walsingham, 1912)
- Gonionota rosacea (Forbes, 1931)
- Gonionota satrapis (Meyrick, 1914)
- Gonionota saulopis Meyrick, 1909
- Gonionota selene Clarke, 1971
- Gonionota sphenogramma Clarke, 1971
- Gonionota teganitis Meyrick, 1909
- Gonionota tenebralis (Hampson, 1906)
- Gonionota transversa Clarke, 1971
- Gonionota uberrima (Meyrick, 1914)
- Gonionota ustimacula (Zeller, 1874)
- Gonionota vexillata (Meyrick, 1913)
- Gonionota vivida (Meyrick, 1926)
