= Gonionota incalescens =

Scientific classification
- Kingdom: Animalia
- Phylum: Arthropoda
- Class: Insecta
- Order: Lepidoptera
- Family: Depressariidae
- Genus: Gonionota
- Species: G. incalescens

Binomial name
- Gonionota incalescens (Meyrick, 1914)

Synonyms
- Hypercallia incalescens Meyrick, 1914

Species of moth

Gonionota incalescens is a moth in the family Depressariidae. It was described by Edward Meyrick in 1914. It is found in Colombia.

The wingspan is 20–21 mm. The forewings are crimson sprinkled with fuscous and with a yellow patch suffusedly reticulated with crimson on the basal fifth of the dorsum, reaching two-thirds across the wing, followed by a rather broad undefined fascia of fuscous suffusion, and the costal area above it suffused with fuscous. The first discal stigma is dark fuscous, on the edge of this fascia. A fuscous streak is found along the dorsum from this to the tornus and there is a fuscous line from two-fifths of the costa to beyond the middle of the dorsum. The second discal stigma is small and white. There is also an oblique fuscous blotch from the middle of the costa, beyond which is a wedge-shaped white costal mark followed by a spot of dark fuscous suffusion, connected with the preceding blotch beneath. A moderate fuscous terminal fascia is nearly preceded by an indistinct rather curved fuscous transverse line partially confluent with it. The hindwings are pale yellow-greyish, palest in the disc.
