= Gonionota isodryas =

Scientific classification
- Kingdom: Animalia
- Phylum: Arthropoda
- Class: Insecta
- Order: Lepidoptera
- Family: Depressariidae
- Genus: Gonionota
- Species: G. isodryas

Binomial name
- Gonionota isodryas (Meyrick, 1921)

Synonyms
- Hypercallia isodryas Meyrick, 1921

Species of moth

Gonionota isodryas is a moth in the family Depressariidae. It was described by Edward Meyrick in 1921. It is found in Brazil (Para).

The wingspan is about 14 mm. The forewings are brown. The first discal stigma is minute and blackish, the second small and white. There is a very oblique white strigula from the costa before three-fourths, from near the apex of this a curved series of small indistinct dots of blackish irroration near the costa and termen to the tornus. The hindwings are grey.
