= Gonionota constellata =

Scientific classification
- Kingdom: Animalia
- Phylum: Arthropoda
- Class: Insecta
- Order: Lepidoptera
- Family: Depressariidae
- Genus: Gonionota
- Species: G. constellata

Binomial name
- Gonionota constellata (Meyrick, 1912)

Synonyms
- Coptotelia constellata Meyrick, 1912

Species of moth

Gonionota constellata is a moth in the family Depressariidae. It was described by Edward Meyrick in 1912. It is found in Colombia.

The wingspan is about 19 mm. The forewings are brown irregularly mixed with dark fuscous and with a small pale yellow spot in the middle of the base, and one on the costa near the base. The first discal stigma is minute, yellow, the second white, with some yellow scales and small marks round it and a small yellow spot beyond it. There are small yellow spots on the costa at two-fifths and three-fourths, one at the apex, and some scattered scales or small marks towards the costa posteriorly. There is also a terminal fascia of dark fuscous suffusion. The hindwings are light grey.
