= Gonionota lichenista =

Scientific classification
- Kingdom: Animalia
- Phylum: Arthropoda
- Class: Insecta
- Order: Lepidoptera
- Family: Depressariidae
- Genus: Gonionota
- Species: G. lichenista

Binomial name
- Gonionota lichenista (Meyrick, 1926)

Synonyms
- Hypercallia lichenista Meyrick, 1926

Species of moth

Gonionota lichenista is a moth in the family Depressariidae. It was described by Edward Meyrick in 1926. It is found in Colombia.

The wingspan is about 19 mm. The forewings are rather dark fuscous, irregularly sprinkled light dull greenish, tending indistinctly to form lines of irroration on the veins. There are small dull greenish spots on the costa at one-third and three-fourths, from the latter a fine curved dull greenish line runs very near the margin around the costa and termen to the tornus. The hindwings are dark grey.
