= Gonionota aethoptera =

Scientific classification
- Domain: Eukaryota
- Kingdom: Animalia
- Phylum: Arthropoda
- Class: Insecta
- Order: Lepidoptera
- Family: Depressariidae
- Genus: Gonionota
- Species: G. aethoptera

Binomial name
- Gonionota aethoptera J. F. G. Clarke, 1971

Species of moth

Gonionota aethoptera is a moth in the family Depressariidae. It was described by John Frederick Gates Clarke in 1971. It is found in Venezuela.

The wingspan is 24–25 mm. The forewings are light cinnamon brown with scattered grey scales along the fold to the tornus and irregularly in the apical half. The termen is narrowly blackish from vein 4 to the tornus and there is a small white spot at the apical third of the costa and at the basal third, in the cell, are two black spots. At the end of the cell is a conspicuous white spot and the dorsum has a conspicuous dark brown streak. The hindwings are light ocherous tawny overlaid with grey scales.
