= Gonionota rhacina =

Scientific classification
- Domain: Eukaryota
- Kingdom: Animalia
- Phylum: Arthropoda
- Class: Insecta
- Order: Lepidoptera
- Family: Depressariidae
- Genus: Gonionota
- Species: G. rhacina

Binomial name
- Gonionota rhacina Walsingham, 1912

Species of moth

Gonionota rhacina is a moth in the family Depressariidae. It was described by Lord Walsingham in 1912. It is found in Guatemala.

The wingspan is about 20 mm. The forewings are tawny reddish brown, with a reddish fawn patch at the base of the dorsum, extending to the upper edge of the cell as far as one-third from the base where it is narrowly produced to the costa, a group of separate blackish scales lying at its outer edge on the cell. Beyond, the middle the costa is deeply sinuate, the depressed portion narrowly white. The hindwings are reddish grey.
