= Gonionota ioleuca =

Scientific classification
- Kingdom: Animalia
- Phylum: Arthropoda
- Class: Insecta
- Order: Lepidoptera
- Family: Depressariidae
- Genus: Gonionota
- Species: G. ioleuca

Binomial name
- Gonionota ioleuca (Meyrick, 1912)

Synonyms
- Coptotelia ioleuca Meyrick, 1912

Species of moth

Gonionota ioleuca is a moth in the family Depressariidae. It was described by Edward Meyrick in 1912. It is found in Argentina.

The wingspan is about 19 mm. The forewings are fuscous, sprinkled with dark fuscous and with a pale yellowish basal patch reticulated with ferruginous occupying two-fifths of the wing, including a broad fuscous costal streak, the outer edge curved. the first discal stigma is represented by a round snow-white spot within the edge of the basal patch, the second by a white dot edged with ferruginous. There is a small pale yellowish triangular spot edged with ferruginous on the costa at two-thirds, where a strongly curved series of dots of dark fuscous irroration runs near the margins to the dorsum at two-thirds. The hindwings are ochreous-whitish.
