= Gonionota aethographa =

Scientific classification
- Domain: Eukaryota
- Kingdom: Animalia
- Phylum: Arthropoda
- Class: Insecta
- Order: Lepidoptera
- Family: Depressariidae
- Genus: Gonionota
- Species: G. aethographa

Binomial name
- Gonionota aethographa J. F. G. Clarke, 1971

Species of moth

Gonionota aethographa is a moth in the family Depressariidae. It was described by John Frederick Gates Clarke in 1971. It is found in Costa Rica.

The wingspan is about 18 mm. The forewings are sayal brown with the basal half of the wing, marked by an oblique line from the costal two fifths to the tornus, cinnamon buff, shading to pinkish buff before the dorsum. The dorsum is marked by a dark brown streak, broadest at the middle, extending from the basal fourth to the tornus. The costa is narrowly roseate and with slender pink streak at the apical third. In the cell, at the basal third, are two small fuscous spots and a similar single one at the end of the cell and on the termen, between the veins, are five ill-defined, fuscous dashes. The hindwings are sayal brown.
