= Gonionota comastis =

Scientific classification
- Kingdom: Animalia
- Phylum: Arthropoda
- Class: Insecta
- Order: Lepidoptera
- Family: Depressariidae
- Genus: Gonionota
- Species: G. comastis

Binomial name
- Gonionota comastis Meyrick, 1909

Species of moth

Gonionota comastis is a moth in the family Depressariidae. It was described by Edward Meyrick in 1909. It is found in Peru and Colombia.

The wingspan is about 24 mm. The forewings are bright deep yellow, broadly and suffusedly reticulated with crimson red, becoming confluent towards the margins and with some small irregular scattered fuscous spots on the anterior half. The costal edge is fuscous, interrupted with white before the middle, and by a small triangular white spot at three-fourths. There is a fuscous streak from the middle of the costa to one-third of the dorsum, preceded by a small oblique white spot in the disc, partially edged anteriorly with dark fuscous. There is also a curved linear dark fuscous mark representing the second discal stigma and some fuscous suffusion around the white costal spot, where it proceeds two rather curved rows of cloudy dark fuscous dots to before the tornus. There is also some purplish-fuscous suffusion along the termen. The hindwings are yellow whitish, towards the costa whiter and the posterior half suffused with light rosy grey, more rosy anteriorly, greyer towards the apex.
