= Gonionota determinata =

Scientific classification
- Domain: Eukaryota
- Kingdom: Animalia
- Phylum: Arthropoda
- Class: Insecta
- Order: Lepidoptera
- Family: Depressariidae
- Genus: Gonionota
- Species: G. determinata

Binomial name
- Gonionota determinata Clarke, 1964

Species of moth

Gonionota determinata is a moth in the family Depressariidae. It was described by Clarke in 1964. It is found in Guyana and Venezuela.

The wingspan is 19–27 mm. The forewings are brown blotched and suffused with fuscous and there is a buff yellow basal patch to the costal two-fifths, heavily overlaid with reddish ocherous in females and divided near the middle by an angulate line of ground color. The costal edge of the basal patch is broadly brown in females and narrowly edged with fuscous in males. Beyond the basal patch, and separated from it by an arm of ground color, is an outwardly oblique buff yellow blotch reaching vein three. Beyond this outer blotch, a few scattered black scales are found subcostally. There is a fuscous spot in the cell at two-fifths and a white dot bordered outwardly by a few fuscous scales at the end of the cell. At the apical third of the costa is a narrow white dash bordered inwardly with reddish ocherous and followed on the costa by a few white scales. The apical fourth of the wing is lightly streaked with grey scales. The hindwings are brownish ocherous in females, and considerably lighter in males, with conspicuous brown or fuscous scaling in the anal area.
