= Gonionota luteola =

Scientific classification
- Domain: Eukaryota
- Kingdom: Animalia
- Phylum: Arthropoda
- Class: Insecta
- Order: Lepidoptera
- Family: Depressariidae
- Genus: Gonionota
- Species: G. luteola

Binomial name
- Gonionota luteola (Felder & Rogenhofer, 1875)

Synonyms
- Carcina luteola Felder & Rogenhofer, 1875

Species of moth

Gonionota luteola is a moth in the family Depressariidae. It was described by Cajetan Felder, Rudolf Felder and Alois Friedrich Rogenhofer in 1875. It is found in Brazil.
