= Gonionota poecilia =

Scientific classification
- Domain: Eukaryota
- Kingdom: Animalia
- Phylum: Arthropoda
- Class: Insecta
- Order: Lepidoptera
- Family: Depressariidae
- Genus: Gonionota
- Species: G. poecilia

Binomial name
- Gonionota poecilia J. F. G. Clarke, 1971

Species of moth

Gonionota poecilia is a moth in the family Depressariidae. It was described by John Frederick Gates Clarke in 1971. It is found in Venezuela.

The wingspan is 16–19 mm. The forewings are sayal brown, with mostly scarlet and orange-yellow blotches and spots set off by a fuscous reticulum at the dorsal two thirds. On the basal third of the dorsum is a triangular spot of ground color, its base on the dorsal edge and on the basal third of the costa is an orange yellow triangle containing scarlet scales. A similarly colored wedge-shaped mark is found on the outer third of the costa and at the basal third, in the cell, is a large white spot followed at the end of the cell by a similar, but smaller, spot. Subterminally, an outwardly curved row of fuscous dashes runs from vein 9 to vein lc and the terminal edge from the apex around the tornus to the base of the dorsum is narrowly fuscous. The hindwings are ocherous white, basally shading to clay color toward the margins.
