= Gonionota amauroptera =

Scientific classification
- Domain: Eukaryota
- Kingdom: Animalia
- Phylum: Arthropoda
- Class: Insecta
- Order: Lepidoptera
- Family: Depressariidae
- Genus: Gonionota
- Species: G. amauroptera

Binomial name
- Gonionota amauroptera J. F. G. Clarke, 1971

Species of moth

Gonionota amauroptera is a moth in the family Depressariidae. It was described by John Frederick Gates Clarke in 1971. It is found in Argentina.

The wingspan is 16–20 mm. The forewings are hazel with the costa narrowly reddish, the extreme edge whitish. At the basal fifth is an indistinct, transverse, fuscous fascia and a similar outwardly oblique one at two fifths. At the apical third of the costa is a wedge-shaped spot varying from white to reddish and there is a pair of minute black discal spots in the cell at the basal third. At the end of the cell is a black-edged white spot and the base of the dorsum is yellow becoming orange rufous toward the tornus. On the termen is an ill-defined row of fuscous spots. The hindwings are ocherous white basally, shading to pale brownish apically.
