= Gonionota tenebralis =

Scientific classification
- Kingdom: Animalia
- Phylum: Arthropoda
- Class: Insecta
- Order: Lepidoptera
- Family: Depressariidae
- Genus: Gonionota
- Species: G. tenebralis

Binomial name
- Gonionota tenebralis (Hampson, 1906)

Synonyms
- Salobrena tenebralis Hampson, 1906; Gonionota charagma J. F. G. Clarke, 1971

Species of moth

Gonionota tenebralis is a moth in the family Depressariidae. It was described by George Hampson in 1906. It is found in Santa Catarina, Brazil.

The wingspan is 16–20 mm. The forewings are fuscous, overlaid and suffused reddish brown and from the basal third of the costa an all-defined olive-buff fascia extends to the fold then continues to the tornus. From the apex to vein 2, an ill-defined olive-buff transverse fascia is found. The hindwings are sepia.
