= Gonionota anisodes =

Scientific classification
- Kingdom: Animalia
- Phylum: Arthropoda
- Class: Insecta
- Order: Lepidoptera
- Family: Depressariidae
- Genus: Gonionota
- Species: G. anisodes

Binomial name
- Gonionota anisodes (Meyrick, 1916)

Synonyms
- Hypercallis anisodes Meyrick, 1916

Species of moth

Gonionota anisodes is a moth in the family Depressariidae. It was described by Edward Meyrick in 1916. It is found in French Guiana and Brazil.

The wingspan is 16–17 millimetres (0.63–0.67 in). The forewings are ochreous brown, somewhat lighter and yellowish-tinged towards the dorsum and termen. There is a darker brown streak along the dorsum from one-fourth to three-fourths. A faint violet-whitish dot is found on the costa at two-fifths, and a fine indistinct oblique whitish strigula at three-fourths. The first discal stigma is minute and blackish, the second very small and white. The hindwings are grey.
