= Gonionota vexillata =

Scientific classification
- Kingdom: Animalia
- Phylum: Arthropoda
- Class: Insecta
- Order: Lepidoptera
- Family: Depressariidae
- Genus: Gonionota
- Species: G. vexillata

Binomial name
- Gonionota vexillata (Meyrick, 1913)

Synonyms
- Coptotelia vexillata Meyrick, 1913

Species of moth

Gonionota vexillata is a moth in the family Depressariidae. It was described by Edward Meyrick in 1913. It is found in Peru.

The wingspan is 21–22 mm. The forewings are brown tinged with purple, the dorsal edge sometimes suffused with dark purplish fuscous and with an elongate deep yellow patch suffusedly mixed with bright crimson extending from the base of the dorsum along the costa to the middle and then projecting downwards to the end of the cell, marked with purplish fuscous towards the base of the costa and twice interrupted posteriorly. The first discal stigma is indistinct and blackish. The costal edge is white for a short distance towards two-thirds, edged beneath with rosy suffusion. The hindwings are dark fuscous.
