= Gonionota militaris =

Scientific classification
- Kingdom: Animalia
- Phylum: Arthropoda
- Class: Insecta
- Order: Lepidoptera
- Family: Depressariidae
- Genus: Gonionota
- Species: G. militaris

Binomial name
- Gonionota militaris (Meyrick, 1914)

Synonyms
- Hypercallia militaris Meyrick, 1914

Species of moth

Gonionota militaris is a moth in the family Depressariidae. It was described by Edward Meyrick in 1914. It is found in Colombia.

The wingspan is about 25 mm. The forewings are dark crimson fuscous, becoming dark grey towards the termen. There is some brighter crimson suffusion beneath the middle of the disc and a broad crimson-red streak, narrowed to the extremities, along the dorsum from the base to two-thirds, the dorsal edge yellow towards one-fourth. A narrow suffused yellow streak is found along the costa from two-thirds to near the apex, its costal edge white except towards the extremities. The hindwings are blackish grey.
