= Gonionota fimbriata =

Scientific classification
- Domain: Eukaryota
- Kingdom: Animalia
- Phylum: Arthropoda
- Class: Insecta
- Order: Lepidoptera
- Family: Depressariidae
- Genus: Gonionota
- Species: G. fimbriata

Binomial name
- Gonionota fimbriata Clarke, 1964

Species of moth

Gonionota fimbriata is a moth in the family Depressariidae. It was described by Clarke in 1964. It is found in Panama.

The wingspan is 17–21 mm. The forewings are sayal brown faintly blotched with darker brown, the basal patch deep chrome mixed with reddish ocherous and extending to about the basal third of wing. The outer margin is convex and the costal edge of the basal patch is sayal brown, with across the middle of the patch a narrow outwardly curved line of the same color. In the cell near the outer margin of the basal patch are two small black spots, one obliquely above the other. At the end of the cell are a few white scales, preceded and followed by scattered fuscous scaling, indicating an outer discal spot. At the apical third of the costa is a conspicuous triangular white dash followed by some white scales and the dorsum is narrowly edged with fuscous. The hindwings are brownish ocherous.
