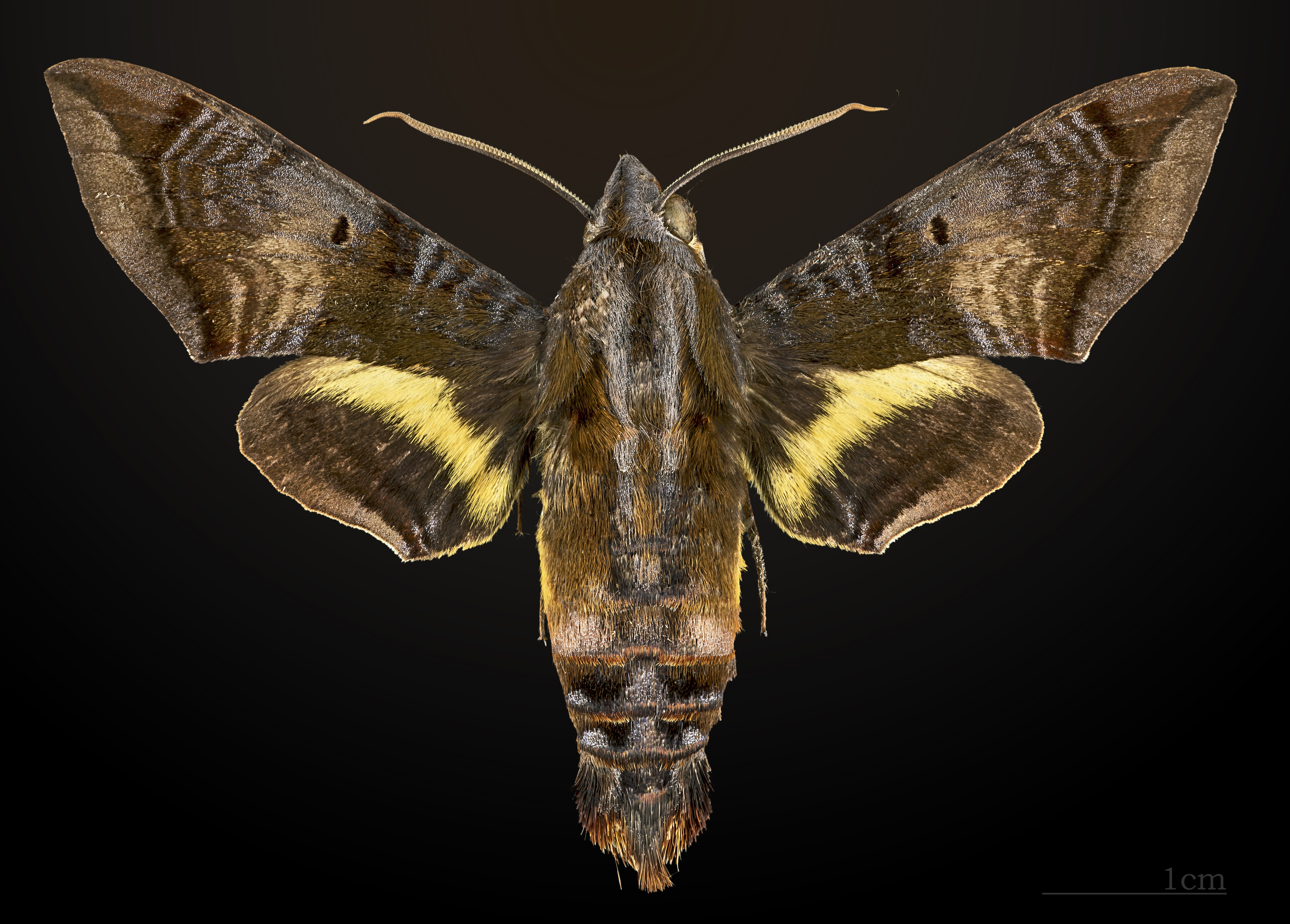
- Dorsal
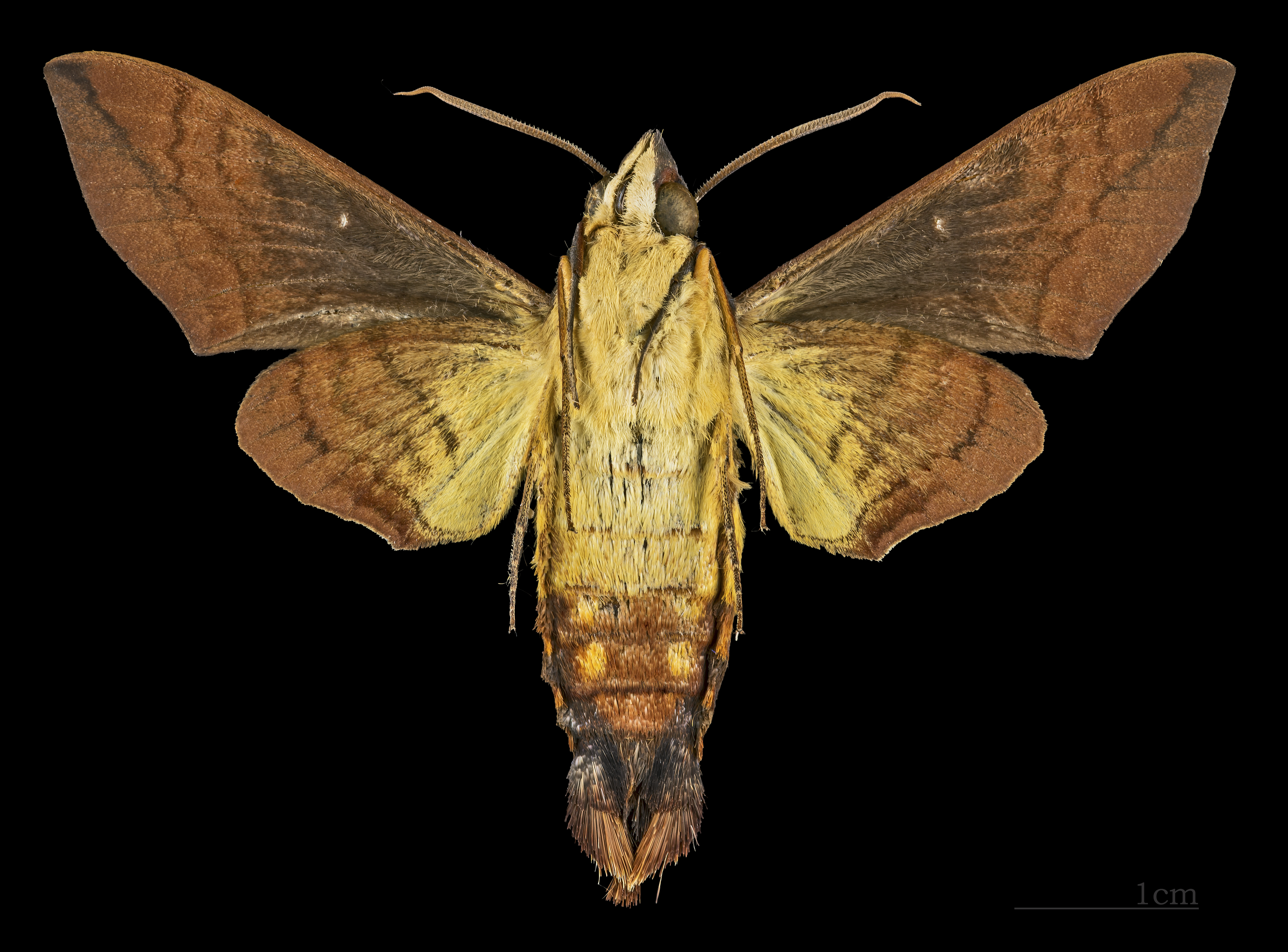
- Ventral

Scientific classification
- Domain: Eukaryota
- Kingdom: Animalia
- Phylum: Arthropoda
- Class: Insecta
- Order: Lepidoptera
- Family: Sphingidae
- Genus: Eupyrrhoglossum
- Species: E. venustum

Binomial name
- Eupyrrhoglossum venustum Rothschild & Jordan, 1910

= Eupyrrhoglossum venustum =

Species of moth

Eupyrrhoglossum venustum is a moth of the family Sphingidae. It is known from tropical and subtropical lowlands in Brazil.

The length of the forewings is about 31 mm. It is similar to Eupyrrhoglossum corvus, but the forewing upperside has seven transverse black lines and there is a pale yellow band with diffuse edges on the hindwing upperside. Furthermore, the underside of the thorax is paler yellow. The median band of the hindwing upperside is greenish-yellow.

Adults are probably on wing year round.

The larvae probably feed on Rubiaceae species, including Guettarda macrosperma and Chomelia spinosa.
