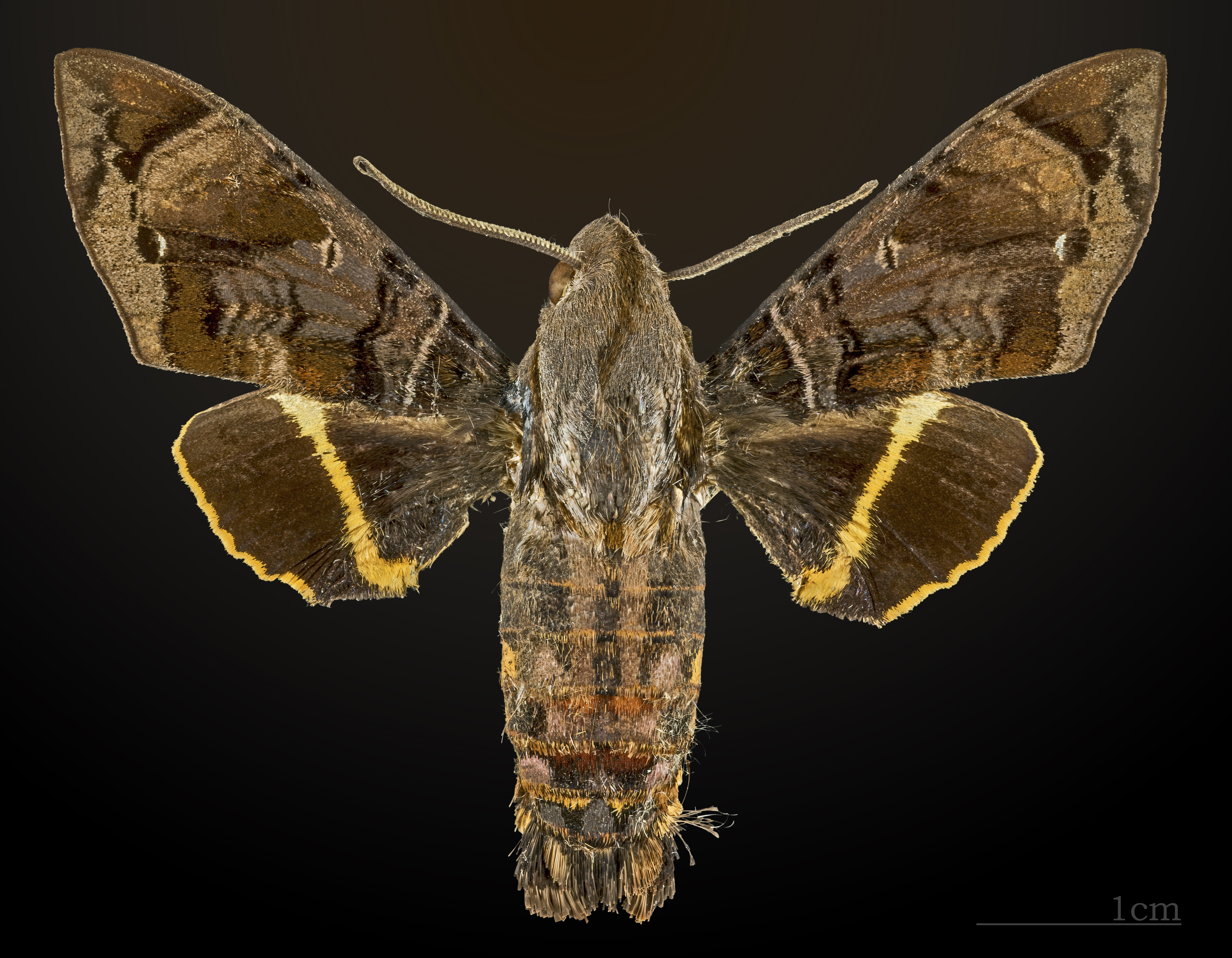

Scientific classification
- Domain: Eukaryota
- Kingdom: Animalia
- Phylum: Arthropoda
- Class: Insecta
- Order: Lepidoptera
- Family: Sphingidae
- Genus: Eupyrrhoglossum
- Species: E. sagra

Binomial name
- Eupyrrhoglossum sagra (Poey, 1832)

Synonyms
- Macroglossum sagra Poey, 1832; Macroglossa sagra Walker, 1856; Macroglossa harpyia Schaufuss, 1870

= Eupyrrhoglossum sagra =

Species of moth

Eupyrrhoglossum sagra, the Cuban sphinx, is a moth of the family Sphingidae. The species was first described by Felipe Poey in 1832. It is known from tropical and subtropical lowlands in Cuba and from Mexico and Belize to Guatemala, Costa Rica, Bolivia, Paraguay, Argentina and Uruguay. Occasionally, strays are found in Florida.

The wingspan is 51–53 mm. There is a semi-transparent submarginal spot on the forewing. The head has a low medial crest and the thorax is pale grey, contrasting sharply with the dark brown edges and median line. There is a blackish subbasal band on the forewing upperside and a median yellow band of nearly even width on the hindwing upperside. The fringe is yellow.

Adults are probably on wing year round in the tropics. Adults have been recorded year round (except March) in Costa Rica. In Venezuela, adults have been recorded in April.

The larvae feed on Rubiaceae species, including Guettarda macrosperma, Guettarda scabra and Chomelia spinosa.

== Gallery ==
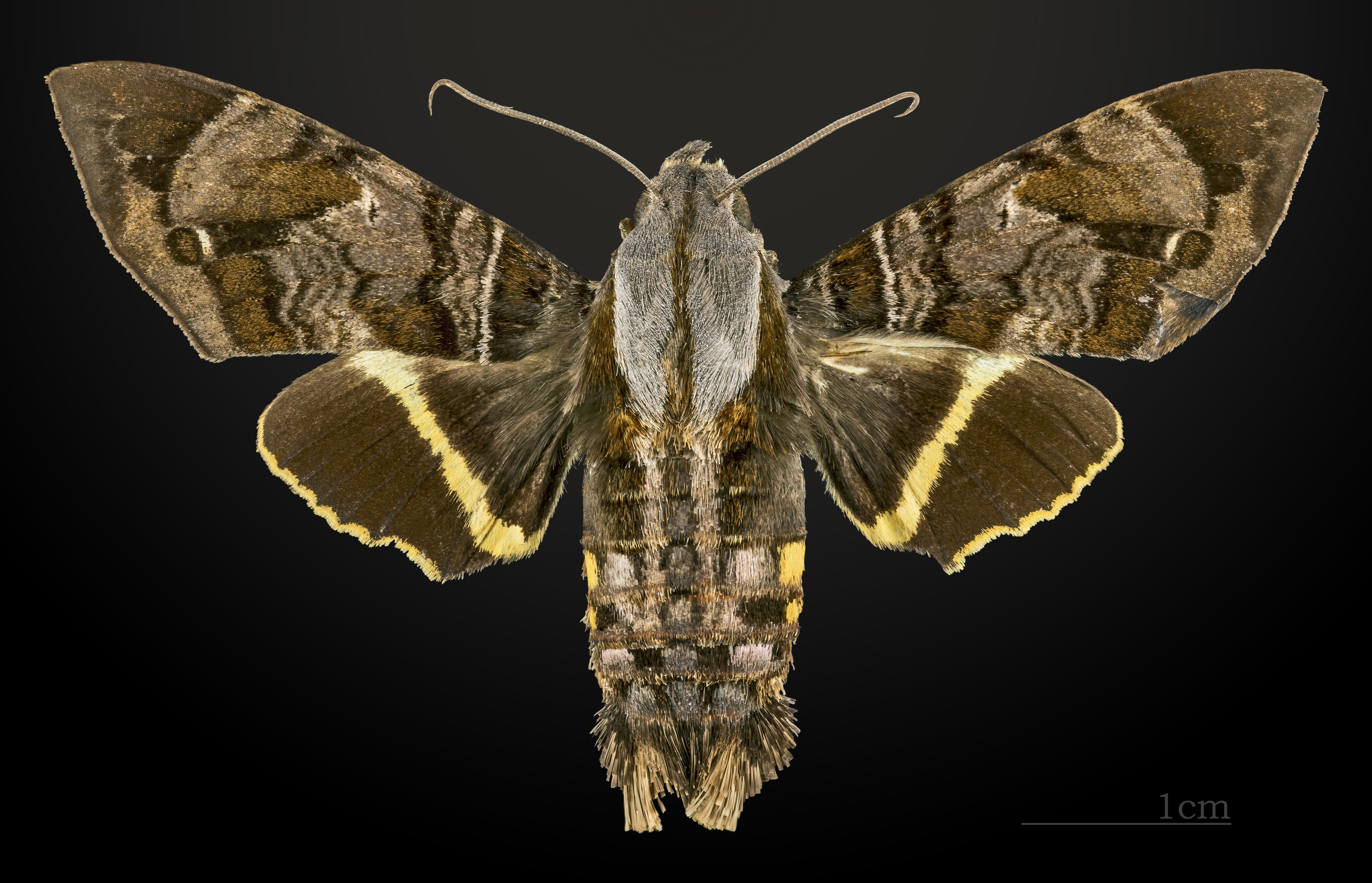
Female

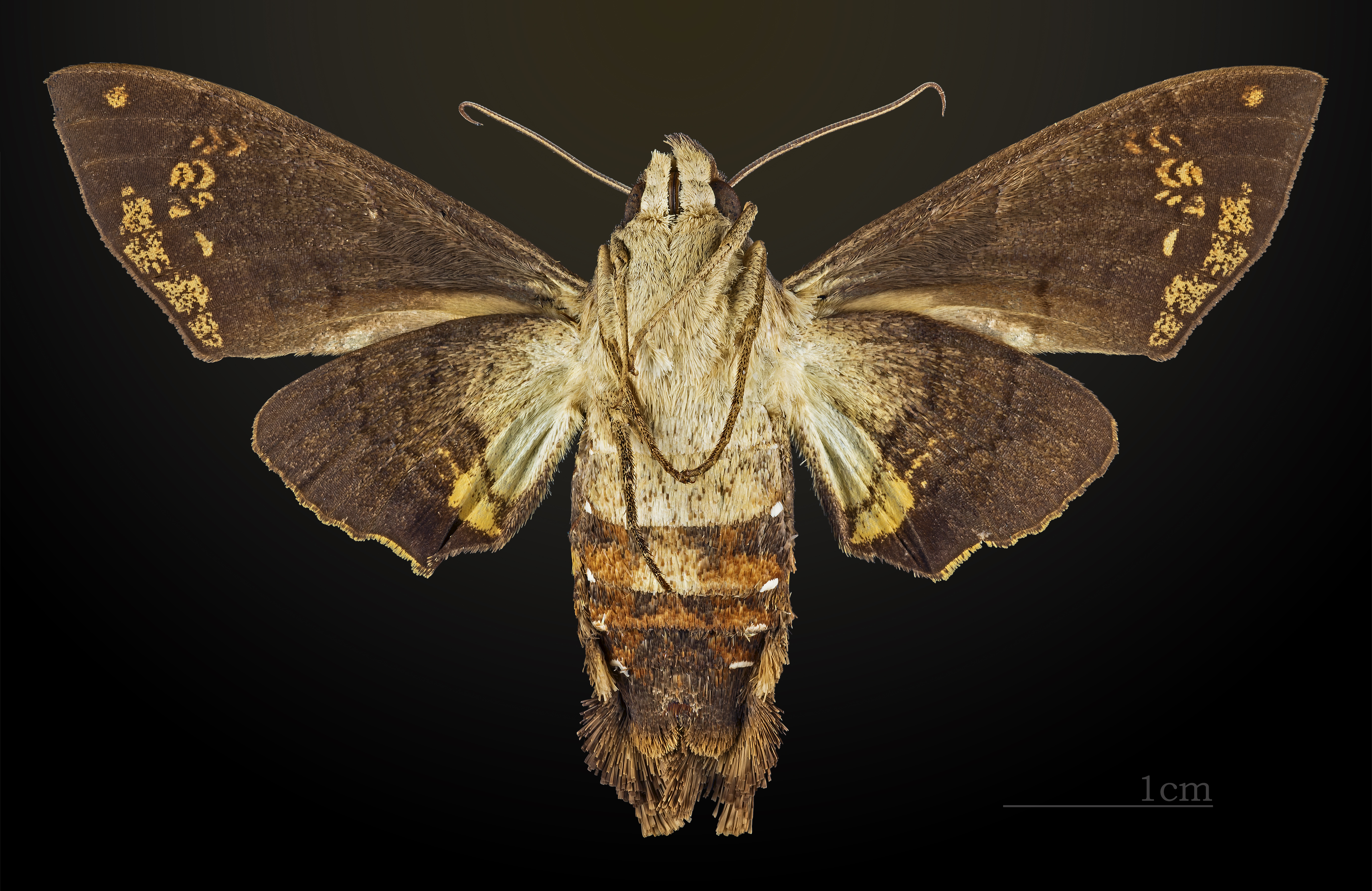
Female underside

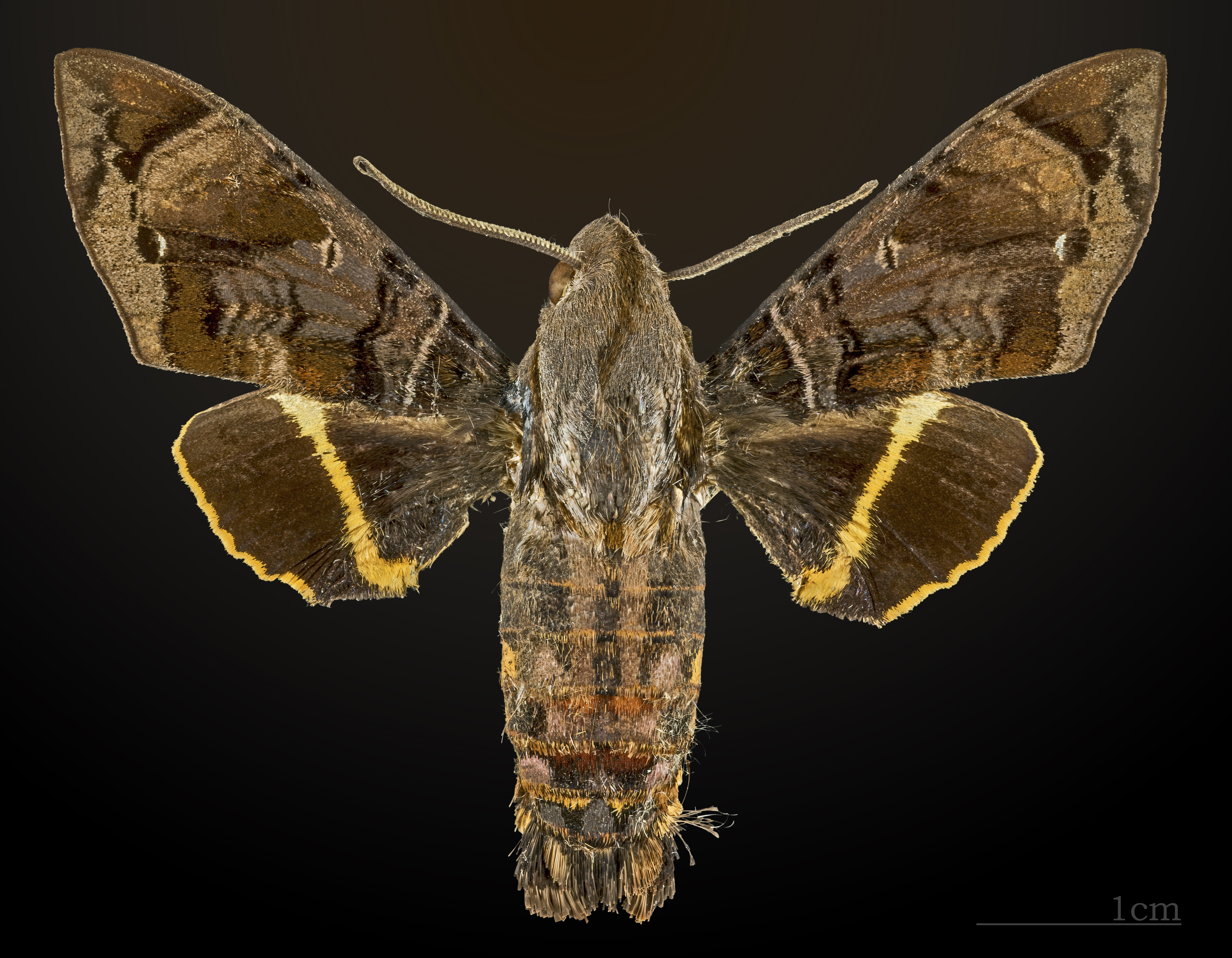
Male

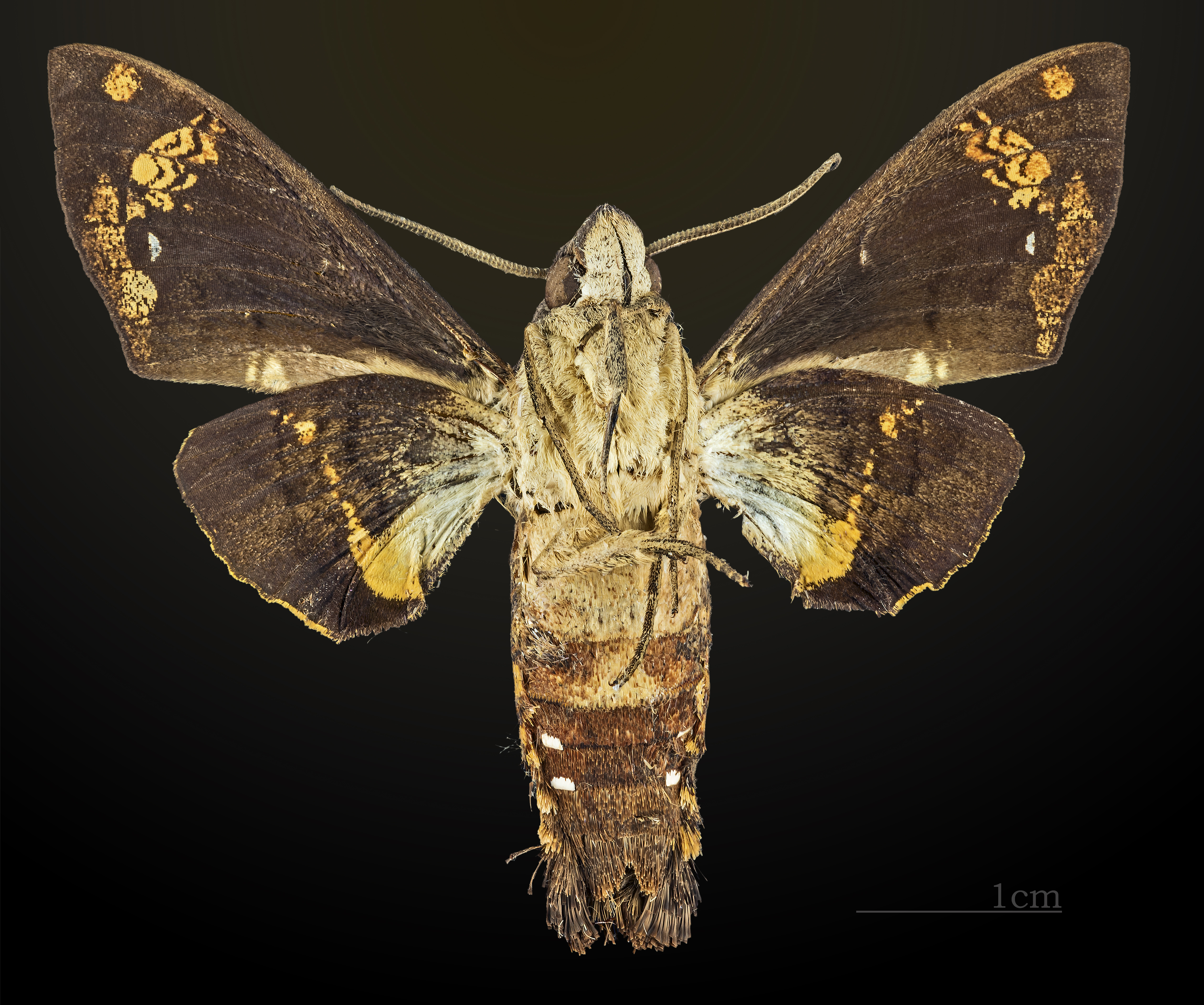
Male underside
