= Eupyrrhoglossum =

Scientific classification
- Domain: Eukaryota
- Kingdom: Animalia
- Phylum: Arthropoda
- Class: Insecta
- Order: Lepidoptera
- Family: Sphingidae
- Subtribe: Dilophonotina
- Genus: Eupyrrhoglossum; Grote, 1865

Species
- See text

Genus of moths

Eupyrrhoglossum is a genus of moths in the family Sphingidae first described by Augustus Radcliffe Grote in 1865.

== Species ==
- Eupyrrhoglossum corvus (Boisduval, 1870)
- Eupyrrhoglossum sagra (Poey, 1832)
- Eupyrrhoglossum venustum Rothschild & Jordan, 1910

== Gallery ==
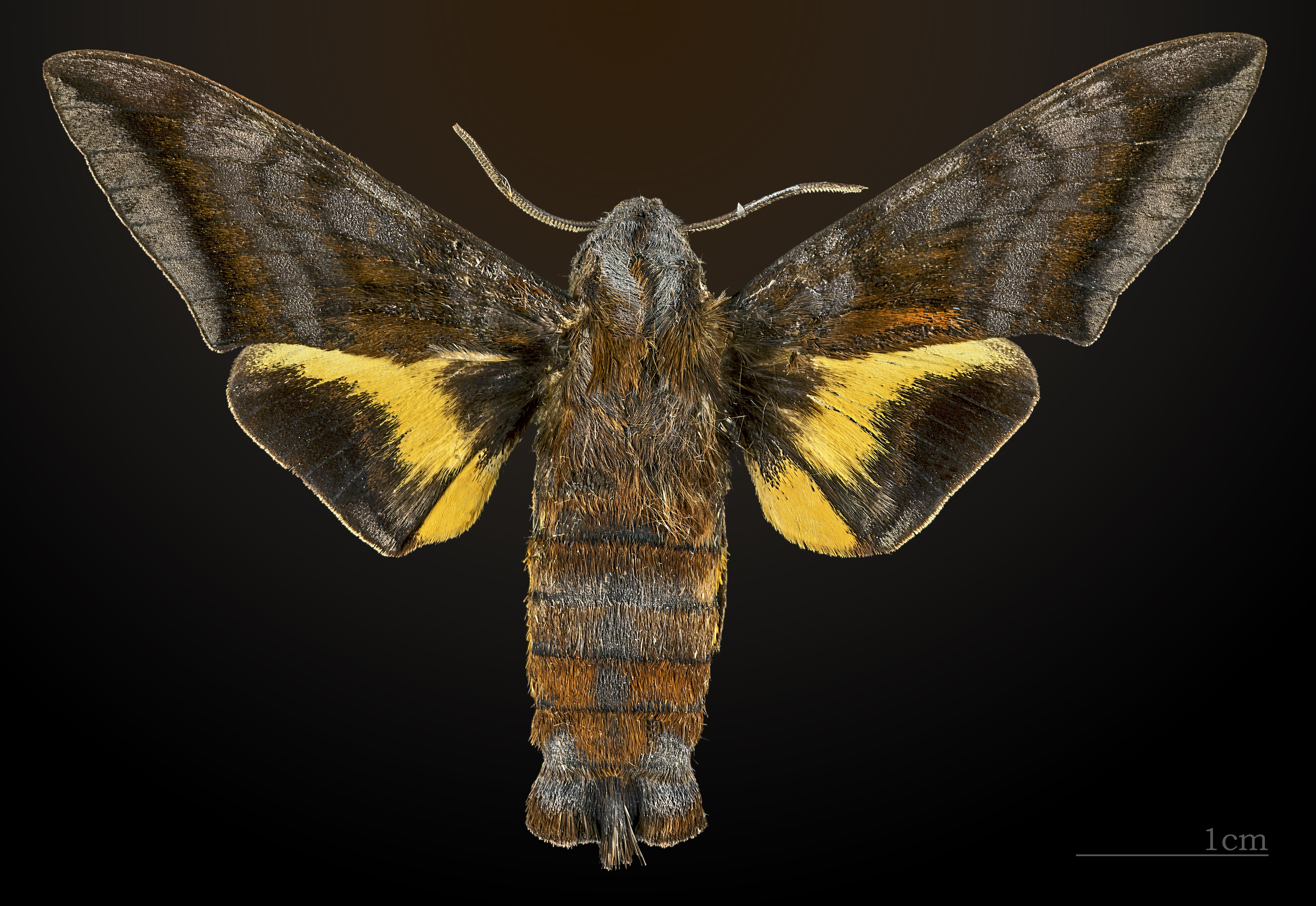
Eupyrrhoglossum corvus

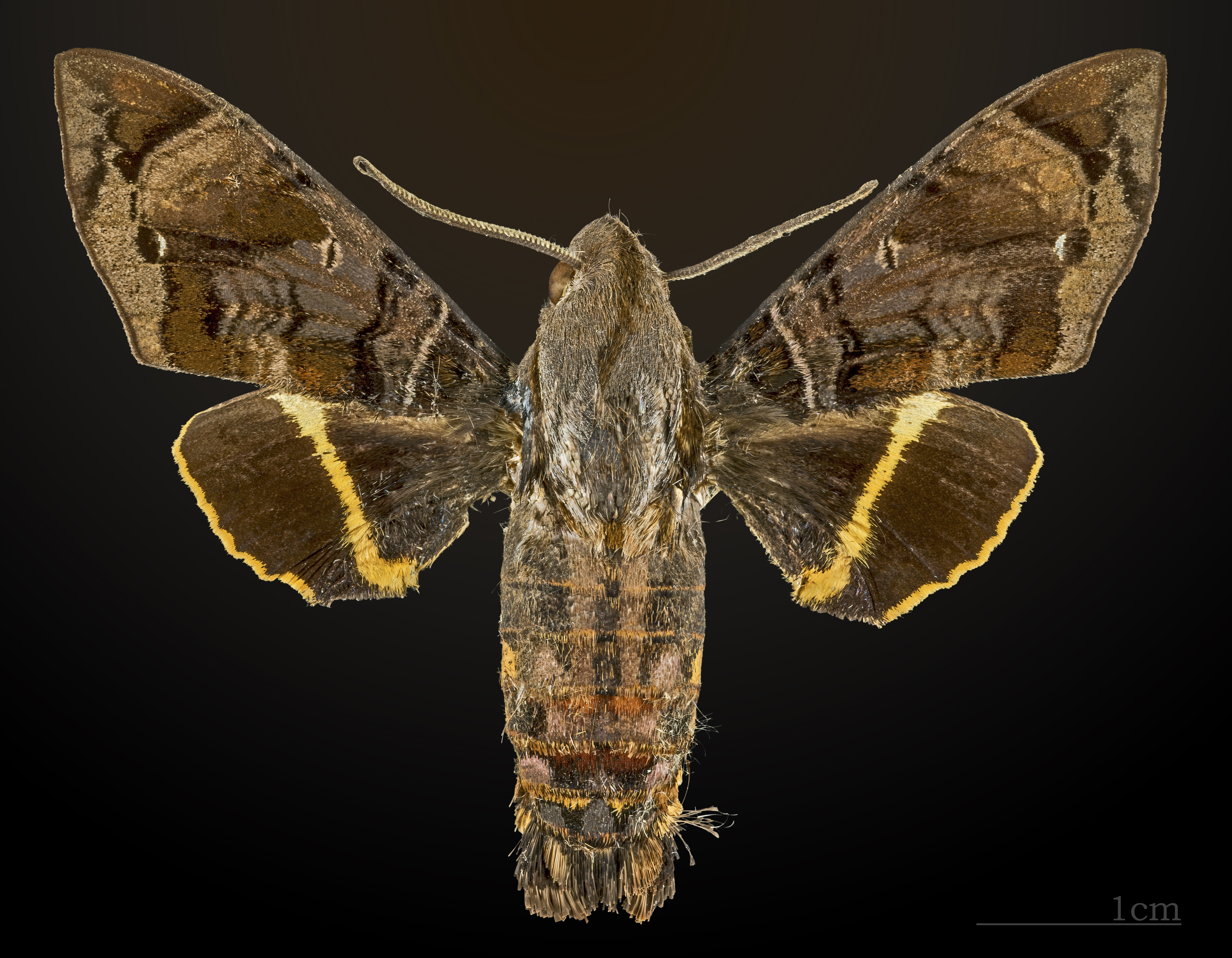
Eupyrrhoglossum sagra

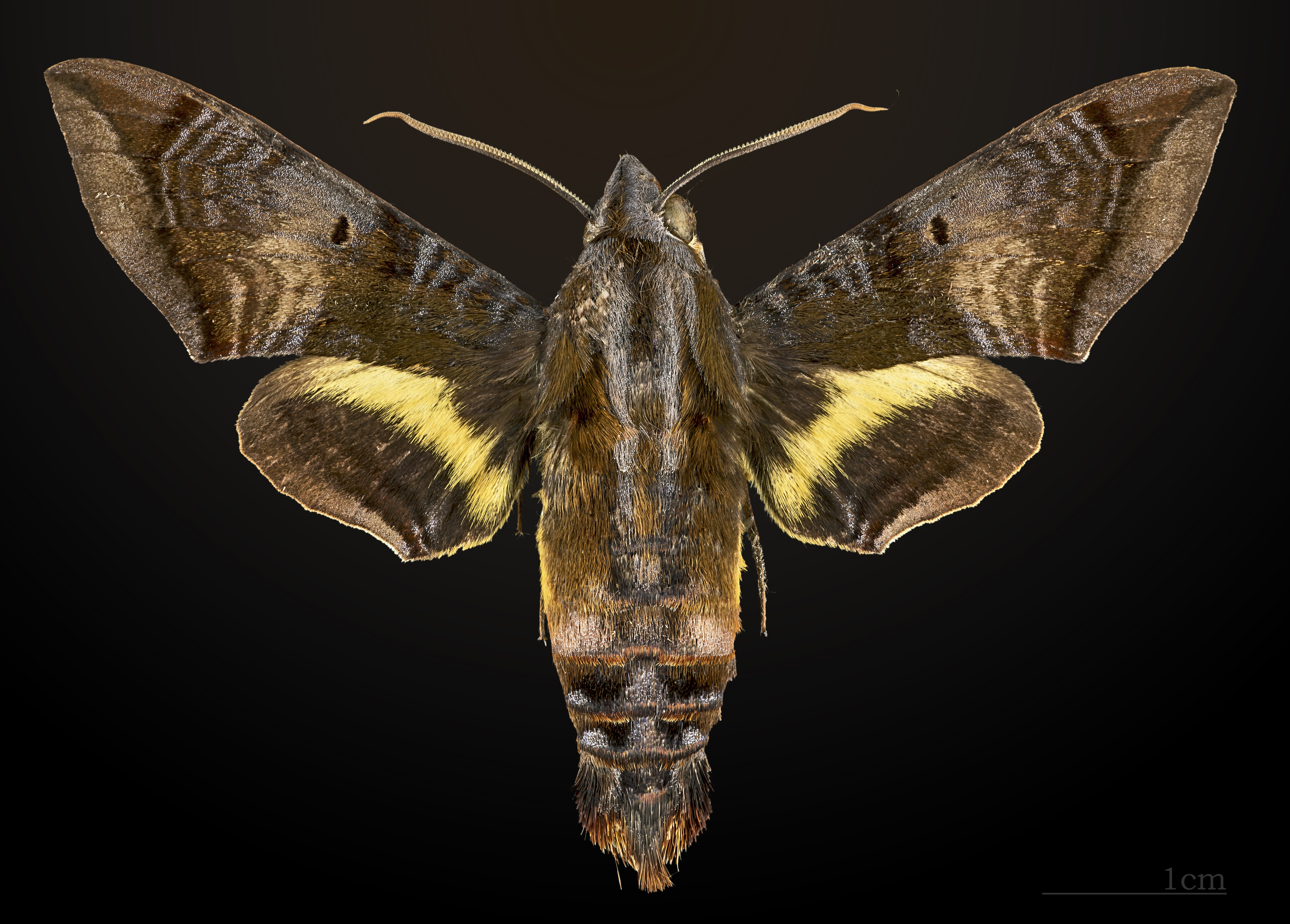
Eupyrrhoglossum venustum
