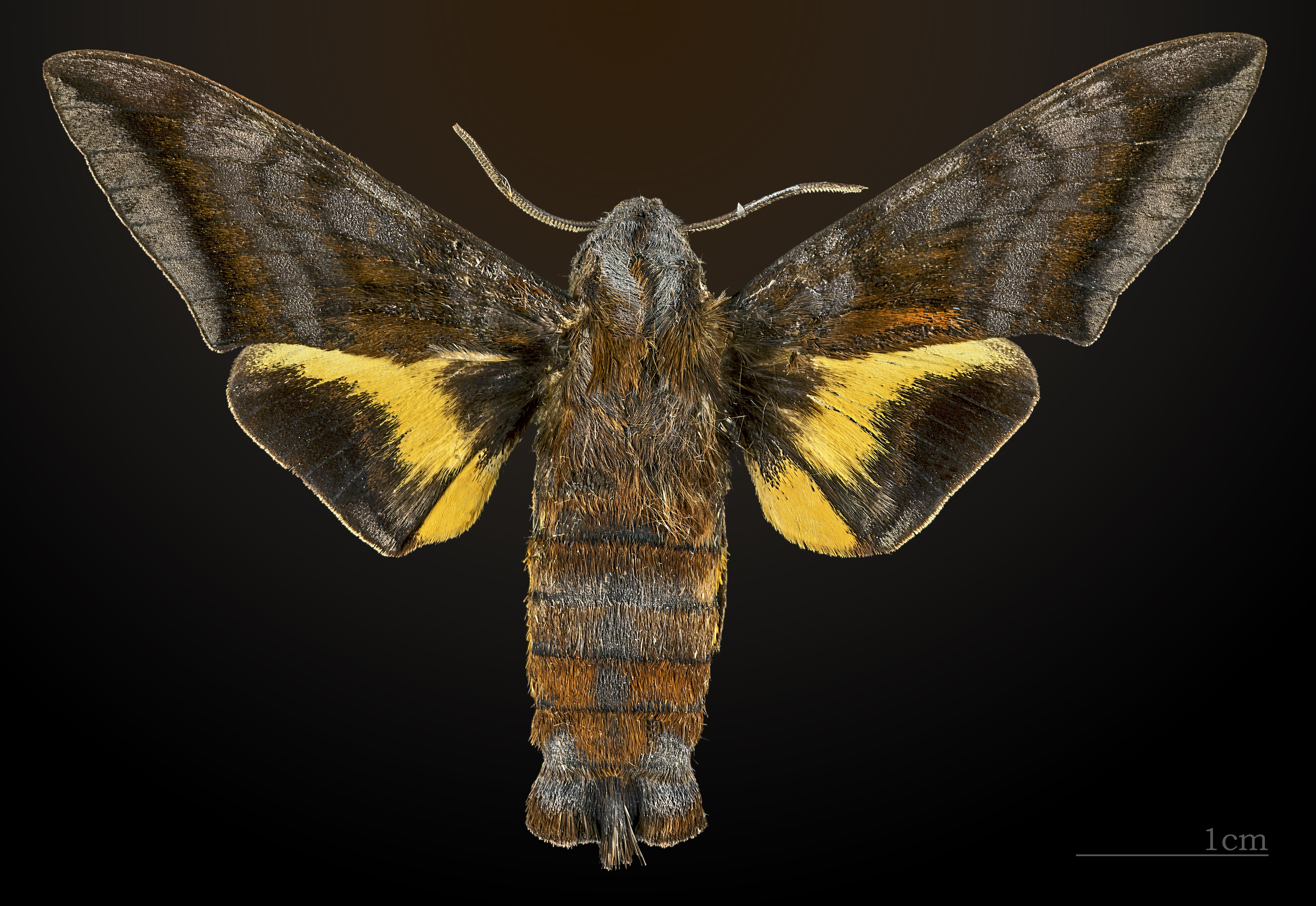
- Dorsal
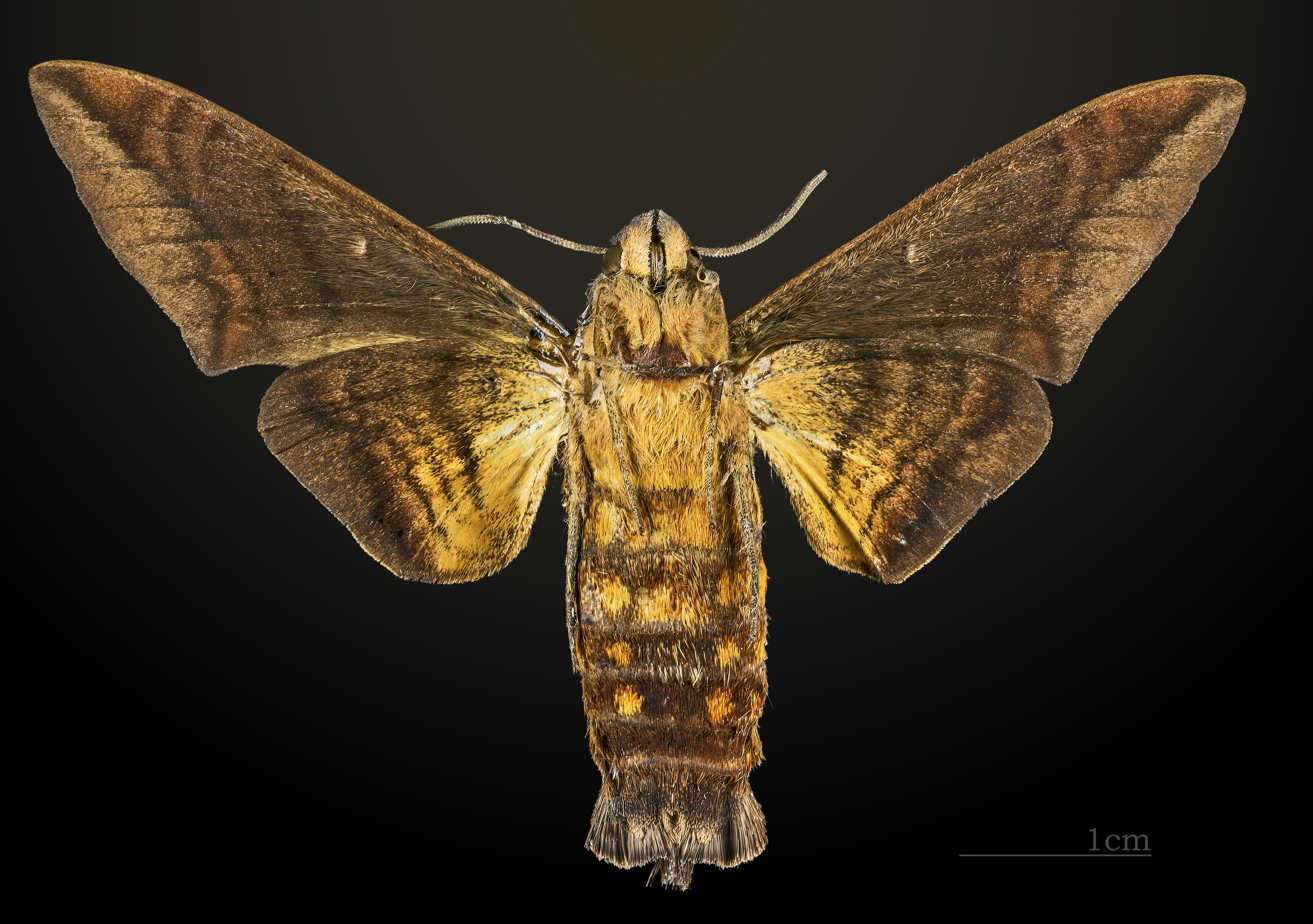
- Ventral

Scientific classification
- Domain: Eukaryota
- Kingdom: Animalia
- Phylum: Arthropoda
- Class: Insecta
- Order: Lepidoptera
- Family: Sphingidae
- Genus: Eupyrrhoglossum
- Species: E. corvus

Binomial name
- Eupyrrhoglossum corvus (Boisduval, 1870)

Synonyms
- Macroglossa corvus Boisduval, 1870

= Eupyrrhoglossum corvus =

Species of moth

Eupyrrhoglossum corvus is a moth of the family Sphingidae. It is known from tropical and subtropical lowlands from Nicaragua to Bolivia, Venezuela and Peru.

It is similar to Perigonia lusca lusca but can be distinguished by the dark grey thorax with dark brown edges and broad median stripe. There is a broad yellow band with diffuse edges on the hindwing upperside. The thorax is dark grey, contrasting with the dark brown edges and the median line.

Adults are probably on wing year round.

The larvae probably feed on Rubiaceae species, such as Guettarda macrosperma and Chomelia spinosa.
