= Agaraea nigrotuberata =

Scientific classification
- Kingdom: Animalia
- Phylum: Arthropoda
- Clade: Pancrustacea
- Class: Insecta
- Order: Lepidoptera
- Superfamily: Noctuoidea
- Family: Erebidae
- Subfamily: Arctiinae
- Genus: Agaraea
- Species: A. nigrotuberata

Binomial name
- Agaraea nigrotuberata Bryk, 1953

Species of moth

Agaraea nigrotuberata is a moth of the family Erebidae. It was described by Felix Bryk in 1953. It is found in Brazil.
