= Agaraea atrivena =

Scientific classification
- Domain: Eukaryota
- Kingdom: Animalia
- Phylum: Arthropoda
- Class: Insecta
- Order: Lepidoptera
- Superfamily: Noctuoidea
- Family: Erebidae
- Subfamily: Arctiinae
- Genus: Agaraea
- Species: A. atrivena

Binomial name
- Agaraea atrivena Dognin, 1911

Species of moth

Agaraea atrivena is a moth of the family Erebidae. It was described by Paul Dognin in 1911. It is found in Colombia.
