= Agaraea minuta =

Scientific classification
- Domain: Eukaryota
- Kingdom: Animalia
- Phylum: Arthropoda
- Class: Insecta
- Order: Lepidoptera
- Superfamily: Noctuoidea
- Family: Erebidae
- Subfamily: Arctiinae
- Genus: Agaraea
- Species: A. minuta

Binomial name
- Agaraea minuta (Schaus, 1892)

Synonyms
- Agoraea minuta Schaus, 1892

Species of moth

Agaraea minuta is a moth of the family Erebidae. It was described by William Schaus in 1892. It is found from Mexico to Guatemala and Brazil.
