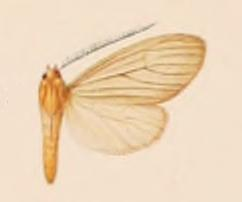
- Agaraea citrinotincta

Scientific classification
- Domain: Eukaryota
- Kingdom: Animalia
- Phylum: Arthropoda
- Class: Insecta
- Order: Lepidoptera
- Superfamily: Noctuoidea
- Family: Erebidae
- Subfamily: Arctiinae
- Subtribe: Phaegopterina
- Genus: Agaraea; Herrich-Schäffer, [1855]

= Agaraea =

Genus of moths

Agaraea is a genus of tiger moths in the family Erebidae. The genus was erected by Gottlieb August Wilhelm Herrich-Schäffer in 1855.

== Species ==
- Agaraea atrivena Dognin, 1911
- Agaraea boettgeri Rothschild, 1909
- Agaraea citrinotincta Rothschild, 1909
- Agaraea emendatus (H. Edwards, 1884)
- Agaraea insconspicua Schaus, 1910
- Agaraea internervosa (Dognin, 1912)
- Agaraea klagesi Rothschild, 1909
- Agaraea longicornis Herrich-Schäffer, [1855]
- Agaraea minuta (Schaus, 1892)
- Agaraea mossi Rothschild, 1922
- Agaraea nigrostriata Rothschild, 1909
- Agaraea nigrotuberata Bryk, 1953
- Agaraea ockendeni Rothschild, 1909
- Agaraea phaeophlebia Hampson, 1920
- Agaraea rulla Schaus, 1920
- Agaraea santaris Schaus, 1920
- Agaraea schausi Rothschild, 1909
- Agaraea semivitrea Rothschild, 1909
- Agaraea sorex (Druce, 1902)
- Agaraea strigata (Reich, 1936)
- Agaraea uniformis (Hampson, 1898)
