= Agaraea semivitrea =

Scientific classification
- Domain: Eukaryota
- Kingdom: Animalia
- Phylum: Arthropoda
- Class: Insecta
- Order: Lepidoptera
- Superfamily: Noctuoidea
- Family: Erebidae
- Subfamily: Arctiinae
- Genus: Agaraea
- Species: A. semivitrea

Binomial name
- Agaraea semivitrea Rothschild, 1909

Species of moth

Agaraea semivitrea is a moth of the family Erebidae. It was described by Walter Rothschild in 1909. It is found from northern South America, including Venezuela and Peru north to the US state of Texas.

Adults are on wing year round in Costa Rica.
