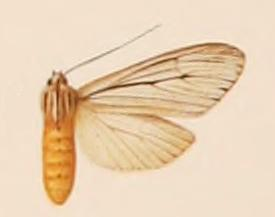

Scientific classification
- Domain: Eukaryota
- Kingdom: Animalia
- Phylum: Arthropoda
- Class: Insecta
- Order: Lepidoptera
- Superfamily: Noctuoidea
- Family: Erebidae
- Subfamily: Arctiinae
- Genus: Agaraea
- Species: A. nigrostriata

Binomial name
- Agaraea nigrostriata Rothschild, 1909

= Agaraea nigrostriata =

Species of moth

Agaraea nigrostriata is a moth of the family Erebidae first described by Walter Rothschild in 1909. It is found in Argentina and Bolivia.
