= Agaraea uniformis =

Scientific classification
- Kingdom: Animalia
- Phylum: Arthropoda
- Class: Insecta
- Order: Lepidoptera
- Superfamily: Noctuoidea
- Family: Erebidae
- Subfamily: Arctiinae
- Genus: Agaraea
- Species: A. uniformis

Binomial name
- Agaraea uniformis (Hampson, 1898)

Synonyms
- Trichodesma uniformis Hampson, 1898; Automolis ruficauda Rothschild, 1910; Agoraea ruficauda Hampson, 1920; Ischnocampa uniformis Hampson, 1920; Agoraea uniformis Auctt.

Species of moth

Agaraea uniformis is a moth of the family Erebidae. It was described by George Hampson in 1898. It is found in Brazil.
