= Agaraea schausi =

Scientific classification
- Domain: Eukaryota
- Kingdom: Animalia
- Phylum: Arthropoda
- Class: Insecta
- Order: Lepidoptera
- Superfamily: Noctuoidea
- Family: Erebidae
- Subfamily: Arctiinae
- Genus: Agaraea
- Species: A. schausi

Binomial name
- Agaraea schausi Rothschild, 1909

Species of moth

Agaraea schausi is a moth of the family Erebidae. It was described by Walter Rothschild in 1909. It is found in Mexico and Panama.
