= Agaraea longicornis =

Scientific classification
- Domain: Eukaryota
- Kingdom: Animalia
- Phylum: Arthropoda
- Class: Insecta
- Order: Lepidoptera
- Superfamily: Noctuoidea
- Family: Erebidae
- Subfamily: Arctiinae
- Genus: Agaraea
- Species: A. longicornis

Binomial name
- Agaraea longicornis Herrich-Schäffer, [1855]

Synonyms
- Pagara venosa Walker, 1856

Species of moth

Agaraea longicornis is a moth of the family Erebidae. It was described by Gottlieb August Wilhelm Herrich-Schäffer in 1855. It is found in Mexico, Guatemala, Panama, Costa Rica, Brazil and Paraguay.
