= Agaraea sorex =

Scientific classification
- Domain: Eukaryota
- Kingdom: Animalia
- Phylum: Arthropoda
- Class: Insecta
- Order: Lepidoptera
- Superfamily: Noctuoidea
- Family: Erebidae
- Subfamily: Arctiinae
- Genus: Agaraea
- Species: A. sorex

Binomial name
- Agaraea sorex (H. Druce, 1902)

Synonyms
- Neritos sorex H. Druce, 1902; Neritos citrinos Bryk, 1953; Trichromia sorex (H. Druce, 1902)

Species of moth

Agaraea sorex is a moth of the family Erebidae. It was described by Herbert Druce in 1902. It is found in Bolivia.

== Subspecies ==
- Agaraea sorex sorex (Bolivia)
- Agaraea sorex citrinos (Bryk, 1953)
