= Agaraea strigata =

Scientific classification
- Domain: Eukaryota
- Kingdom: Animalia
- Phylum: Arthropoda
- Class: Insecta
- Order: Lepidoptera
- Superfamily: Noctuoidea
- Family: Erebidae
- Subfamily: Arctiinae
- Genus: Agaraea
- Species: A. strigata

Binomial name
- Agaraea strigata (Reich, 1936)

Synonyms
- Automolis strigata Reich, 1936

Species of moth

Agaraea strigata is a moth of the family Erebidae. It was described by Reich in 1936. It is found in Colombia.
