= Agaraea internervosa =

Scientific classification
- Domain: Eukaryota
- Kingdom: Animalia
- Phylum: Arthropoda
- Class: Insecta
- Order: Lepidoptera
- Superfamily: Noctuoidea
- Family: Erebidae
- Subfamily: Arctiinae
- Genus: Agaraea
- Species: A. internervosa

Binomial name
- Agaraea internervosa (Dognin, 1912)

Synonyms
- Automolis internervosa Dognin, 1912

Species of moth

Agaraea internervosa is a moth of the family Erebidae. It was described by Paul Dognin in 1912. It is found in Colombia.
