= Agaraea insconspicua =

Scientific classification
- Domain: Eukaryota
- Kingdom: Animalia
- Phylum: Arthropoda
- Class: Insecta
- Order: Lepidoptera
- Superfamily: Noctuoidea
- Family: Erebidae
- Subfamily: Arctiinae
- Genus: Agaraea
- Species: A. insconspicua

Binomial name
- Agaraea insconspicua Schaus, 1910

Species of moth

Agaraea insconspicua is a moth of the family Erebidae. It was described by William Schaus in 1910. It is found in Costa Rica.
