= Agaraea phaeophlebia =

Scientific classification
- Kingdom: Animalia
- Phylum: Arthropoda
- Class: Insecta
- Order: Lepidoptera
- Superfamily: Noctuoidea
- Family: Erebidae
- Subfamily: Arctiinae
- Genus: Agaraea
- Species: A. phaeophlebia

Binomial name
- Agaraea phaeophlebia Hampson, 1920

Species of moth

Agaraea phaeophlebia is a moth of the family Erebidae. It was described by George Hampson in 1920. It is found in Venezuela.
