= Agaraea emendatus =

Scientific classification
- Domain: Eukaryota
- Kingdom: Animalia
- Phylum: Arthropoda
- Class: Insecta
- Order: Lepidoptera
- Superfamily: Noctuoidea
- Family: Erebidae
- Subfamily: Arctiinae
- Genus: Agaraea
- Species: A. emendatus

Binomial name
- Agaraea emendatus (H. Edwards, 1884)

Synonyms
- Euchaetes emendatus H. Edwards, 1884

Species of moth

Agaraea emendatus is a moth of the family Erebidae. It was described by Henry Edwards in 1884. It is found in Mexico.
