= Calliprora trigramma =

Scientific classification
- Kingdom: Animalia
- Phylum: Arthropoda
- Clade: Pancrustacea
- Class: Insecta
- Order: Lepidoptera
- Family: Gelechiidae
- Genus: Calliprora
- Species: C. trigramma

Binomial name
- Calliprora trigramma Meyrick, 1914

Species of moth

Calliprora trigramma is a moth of the family Gelechiidae. It is found in Guyana.

The wingspan is about 10 mm. Adults are similar to Calliprora pentagramma, but the apex of the forewings is more strongly and slenderly produced, the termen vertical, the basal area only has three longitudinal stripes (two median, one subdorsal), the antemedian streak from the dorsum is enlarged into an acute-triangular blotch reaching three-fourths across the wing and the anterior edge is angulated towards the dorsum.
