= Calliprora erethistis =

Scientific classification
- Kingdom: Animalia
- Phylum: Arthropoda
- Clade: Pancrustacea
- Class: Insecta
- Order: Lepidoptera
- Family: Gelechiidae
- Genus: Calliprora
- Species: C. erethistis

Binomial name
- Calliprora erethistis Meyrick, 1922

Species of moth

Calliprora erethistis is a moth of the family Gelechiidae. It is found in Peru.

The wingspan is 9–10 mm. The forewings are dark violet-grey with a transverse whitish irregularly wedge-shaped spot from the middle of the dorsum reaching three-fourths across the wing. There is a fascia of about seven irregularly longitudinal short fine whitish dashes at three-fourths, the uppermost subcostal, the lowest forming a small dorsal spot. There is a purple-silvery angulated subterminal line and a bronzy-ferruginous streak from the costa beyond this to the apex. The hindwings are dark grey.
