= Calliprora peritura =

Scientific classification
- Kingdom: Animalia
- Phylum: Arthropoda
- Clade: Pancrustacea
- Class: Insecta
- Order: Lepidoptera
- Family: Gelechiidae
- Genus: Calliprora
- Species: C. peritura

Binomial name
- Calliprora peritura Meyrick, 1922

Species of moth

Calliprora peritura is a moth of the family Gelechiidae. It is found in Brazil (Para).

The wingspan is about 9 mm. The forewings are rather dark grey with an indistinct dark fuscous streak rising obliquely from the middle of the dorsum, curved in the disc to the angle of the subterminal line. There is an angulated violet-grey subterminal line, whitish towards the extremities, edged with dark fuscous suffusion anteriorly, the wing beyond this ferruginous-brown. The hindwings are dark grey.
