= Calliprora centrocrossa =

Scientific classification
- Kingdom: Animalia
- Phylum: Arthropoda
- Clade: Pancrustacea
- Class: Insecta
- Order: Lepidoptera
- Family: Gelechiidae
- Genus: Calliprora
- Species: C. centrocrossa

Binomial name
- Calliprora centrocrossa Meyrick, 1922

Species of moth

Calliprora centrocrossa is a moth of the family Gelechiidae. It is found in Brazil (Amazonas).

The wingspan is 6–7 mm for males and about 9 mm for females. The forewings are greyish-purple with the dorsal and three other ochreous-whitish longitudinal streaks from the base to two-fifths, the uppermost supramedian. There is a moderate slightly oblique ochreous-whitish fascia from the middle of the dorsum reaching four-fifths across the wing and an ochreous-whitish dot towards the dorsum beyond this. There is an ochreous-yellow oblique streak from the costa at two-thirds and less oblique ochreous-whitish streak from the dorsum before the tornus almost or quite meeting at an acute angle, the angle preceded by an oblique whitish mark. There is an ochreous-yellow marginal line running around the posterior part of the costa and termen. The hindwings are grey.
