= Calliprora clistogramma =

Scientific classification
- Kingdom: Animalia
- Phylum: Arthropoda
- Clade: Pancrustacea
- Class: Insecta
- Order: Lepidoptera
- Family: Gelechiidae
- Genus: Calliprora
- Species: C. clistogramma

Binomial name
- Calliprora clistogramma Meyrick, 1926

Species of moth

Calliprora clistogramma is a moth of the family Gelechiidae. It is found in Brazil (São Paulo).

The wingspan is about 10 mm. The forewings are dark purplish-fuscous and two parallel white lines from the middle of the base to one-third. There are dorsal and subdorsal white lines from the base, terminated by a slightly sinuate pointed white streak from the dorsum slightly before the middle reaching three-fourths across the wing and there is a postmedian band of seven longitudinal white lines, the uppermost short, oblique, slightly interrupted, the next two moderate, the fourth short, the fifth and sixth longest, oblique and the seventh dorsal. Just beyond these is a sinuate white transverse streak on the dorsal half, followed by a violet-silvery-metallic transverse streak angulated above the middle and terminated on the costa by a white mark. Close beyond this a brown streak along the termen extended along the prominence to the apex, but with a short branch to the costa near the preceding, beyond this a small white triangular costal spot. The hindwings are fuscous.
