= Calliprora tetraplecta =

Scientific classification
- Kingdom: Animalia
- Phylum: Arthropoda
- Clade: Pancrustacea
- Class: Insecta
- Order: Lepidoptera
- Family: Gelechiidae
- Genus: Calliprora
- Species: C. tetraplecta

Binomial name
- Calliprora tetraplecta Meyrick, 1922

Species of moth

Calliprora tetraplecta is a moth of the family Gelechiidae. It is found in Peru.

The wingspan is about 10 mm. The forewings are dark violet-fuscous with two closely approximated whitish median lines from the base to one-third, a similar dorsal line, and a subdorsal line terminating in an oblique wedge-shaped mark reaching the middle of the disc. There is a transverse band composed of seven whitish nearly longitudinal lines at three-fourths, the uppermost subcostal, oblique, the third converging to the second, the fourth very short, the sixth oblique, the seventh dorsal. There is an angulated violet-silvery subterminal line, followed by an angulated ferruginous-brown terminal streak, with an arm extending along the apical prominence. The hindwings are dark fuscous, lighter anteriorly.
