= Calliprora =

Scientific classification
- Domain: Eukaryota
- Kingdom: Animalia
- Phylum: Arthropoda
- Class: Insecta
- Order: Lepidoptera
- Family: Gelechiidae
- Tribe: Gelechiini
- Genus: Calliprora; Meyrick, 1914

Genus of moths

Calliprora is a genus of moths in the family Gelechiidae.

== Species ==
- Calliprora centrocrossa Meyrick, 1922
- Calliprora clistogramma Meyrick, 1926
- Calliprora erethistis Meyrick, 1922
- Calliprora eurydelta Meyrick, 1922
- Calliprora pentagramma Meyrick, 1914
- Calliprora peritura Meyrick, 1922
- Calliprora platyxipha Meyrick, 1922
- Calliprora rhodogramma Meyrick, 1922
- Calliprora sexstrigella (Chambers, 1874)
- Calliprora tetraplecta Meyrick, 1922
- Calliprora trigramma Meyrick, 1914
