= Calliprora platyxipha =

Scientific classification
- Kingdom: Animalia
- Phylum: Arthropoda
- Clade: Pancrustacea
- Class: Insecta
- Order: Lepidoptera
- Family: Gelechiidae
- Genus: Calliprora
- Species: C. platyxipha

Binomial name
- Calliprora platyxipha Meyrick, 1922

Species of moth

Calliprora platyxipha is a moth of the family Gelechiidae. It is found in Brazil (Amazonas, Para).

The wingspan is 10–12 mm. The forewings are dark fuscous with a broad ochreous-whitish pointed supramedian streak from the base to near the middle, in females narrower and with a short whitish line above its posterior portion. There is a shorter whitish submedian line from the base, and a much shorter dorsal line towards the base. There a rather oblique triangular whitish spot on the middle of the dorsum reaching half across the wing, in females narrower and in males an oblique whitish wedge-shaped streak from the costa about two-thirds, beneath this a longitudinal line, then a wedge-shaped spot, then two longitudinal lines, and finally one on the dorsum, these markings in females smaller and less developed. There is an angulated purple-grey subterminal line, in females whitish at extremities, in males stronger and whitish on the costal and dorsal thirds. There is a ferruginous-brownish streak from the costa beyond this running to the apex, sometimes extended by obscure suffusion along the termen. The hindwings are dark fuscous.
