= Calliprora sexstrigella =

Scientific classification
- Kingdom: Animalia
- Phylum: Arthropoda
- Clade: Pancrustacea
- Class: Insecta
- Order: Lepidoptera
- Family: Gelechiidae
- Genus: Calliprora
- Species: C. sexstrigella

Binomial name
- Calliprora sexstrigella (Chambers, 1874)

Synonyms
- Polyhymno sexstrigella Chambers, 1874; Calliprora thermogramma Meyrick, 1929

Species of moth

Calliprora sexstrigella is a moth of the family Gelechiidae. It is found in North America, where it has been recorded from Arizona, California, New Mexico and Texas.

The wingspan is about 8 mm.
