= Calliprora eurydelta =

Scientific classification
- Kingdom: Animalia
- Phylum: Arthropoda
- Clade: Pancrustacea
- Class: Insecta
- Order: Lepidoptera
- Family: Gelechiidae
- Genus: Calliprora
- Species: C. eurydelta

Binomial name
- Calliprora eurydelta Meyrick, 1922

Species of moth

Calliprora eurydelta is a moth of the family Gelechiidae. It is found in Peru.

The wingspan is about 12 mm. The forewings are dark violet-grey and the base is narrowly ochreous-whitish, extended as a dorsal streak to a rather oblique broad-triangular blotch on the dorsum before the middle reaching more than half the across wing. There is a band of seven whitish irregularly longitudinal lines or slender streaks at three-fourths, the first subcostal, oblique, the fifth and sixth longest, parallel to the fold, the seventh dorsal. There is a purple-leaden angulated subterminal line, the extremities whitish, some bronzy-ferruginous suffusion before its angle, the wing beyond it wholly bronzy-ferruginous. The hindwings are grey, becoming dark fuscous posteriorly.
