= Calliprora rhodogramma =

Scientific classification
- Kingdom: Animalia
- Phylum: Arthropoda
- Clade: Pancrustacea
- Class: Insecta
- Order: Lepidoptera
- Family: Gelechiidae
- Genus: Calliprora
- Species: C. rhodogramma

Binomial name
- Calliprora rhodogramma Meyrick, 1922

Species of moth

Calliprora rhodogramma is a moth of the family Gelechiidae. It is found in Brazil (Amazonas).

The wingspan is 9–10 mm. The forewings are dark purple-fuscous with a pale yellowish median streak from the base to two-fifths and a pale yellowish sinuate transverse streak before the middle. There is an inwards-oblique pale yellowish subdorsal strigula preceding a dot on the dorsum before the tornus, just beyond this a somewhat oblique pale yellowish streak reaching half across the wing and an oblique mark from the costa at three-fourths, the gap between these preceded by a short pale yellowish longitudinal mark and a faint whitish dash beneath it. There is also a purplish-leaden angulated transverse streak beyond these, the lower portion thick and resting on the termen, the upper half margined posteriorly by an angulated brown streak sending a branch to the apex of the wing, and the angle connected with the tip of the preceding yellow costal mark by a brown mark. Two oblique white wedge-shaped marks are found posteriorly on the costa partly in the cilia. The hindwings are dark grey.
