= Calliprora pentagramma =

Scientific classification
- Kingdom: Animalia
- Phylum: Arthropoda
- Clade: Pancrustacea
- Class: Insecta
- Order: Lepidoptera
- Family: Gelechiidae
- Genus: Calliprora
- Species: C. pentagramma

Binomial name
- Calliprora pentagramma Meyrick, 1914

Species of moth

Calliprora pentagramma is a moth of the family Gelechiidae. It is found in Guyana.

The wingspan is 10–12 mm. The forewings are purple-blackish with the basal area crossed by five longitudinal ochreous-whitish streaks becoming longer upwards, the uppermost nearly reaching the middle but obsolete towards the base, with a short ochreous-whitish mark also on the dorsal edge about one-fourth. There is a rather oblique slightly curved ochreous-whitish streak from before the middle of the dorsum, attenuated upwards, reaching two-thirds across the wing. There is a transverse series of six short longitudinal ochreous-whitish lines on the veins about three-fourths, becoming longer downwards, and a seventh on the dorsum. A coppery-metallic transverse line is found from four-fifths of the costa to tornus, obtusely angulated above the middle, the extremities whitish. There is a fulvous streak just beyond this, sending a branch into the apical projection, the lower portion terminal. The hindwings are dark fuscous.
