= Ardonea rosada =

Scientific classification
- Domain: Eukaryota
- Kingdom: Animalia
- Phylum: Arthropoda
- Class: Insecta
- Order: Lepidoptera
- Superfamily: Noctuoidea
- Family: Erebidae
- Subfamily: Arctiinae
- Genus: Ardonea
- Species: A. rosada

Binomial name
- Ardonea rosada Dognin, 1894

Species of moth

Ardonea rosada is a moth of the subfamily Arctiinae. It was described by Paul Dognin in 1894. It is found in Ecuador.
