= Ardonea metallica =

Scientific classification
- Domain: Eukaryota
- Kingdom: Animalia
- Phylum: Arthropoda
- Class: Insecta
- Order: Lepidoptera
- Superfamily: Noctuoidea
- Family: Erebidae
- Subfamily: Arctiinae
- Genus: Ardonea
- Species: A. metallica

Binomial name
- Ardonea metallica Schaus, 1892

Species of moth

Ardonea metallica is a moth of the subfamily Arctiinae. It was described by William Schaus in 1892. It is found in Peru.
