= Ardonea judaphila =

Scientific classification
- Domain: Eukaryota
- Kingdom: Animalia
- Phylum: Arthropoda
- Class: Insecta
- Order: Lepidoptera
- Superfamily: Noctuoidea
- Family: Erebidae
- Subfamily: Arctiinae
- Genus: Ardonea
- Species: A. judaphila

Binomial name
- Ardonea judaphila Schaus, 1905

Species of moth

Ardonea judaphila is a moth of the subfamily Arctiinae. It was first described by William Schaus in 1905 and is found in French Guiana.
