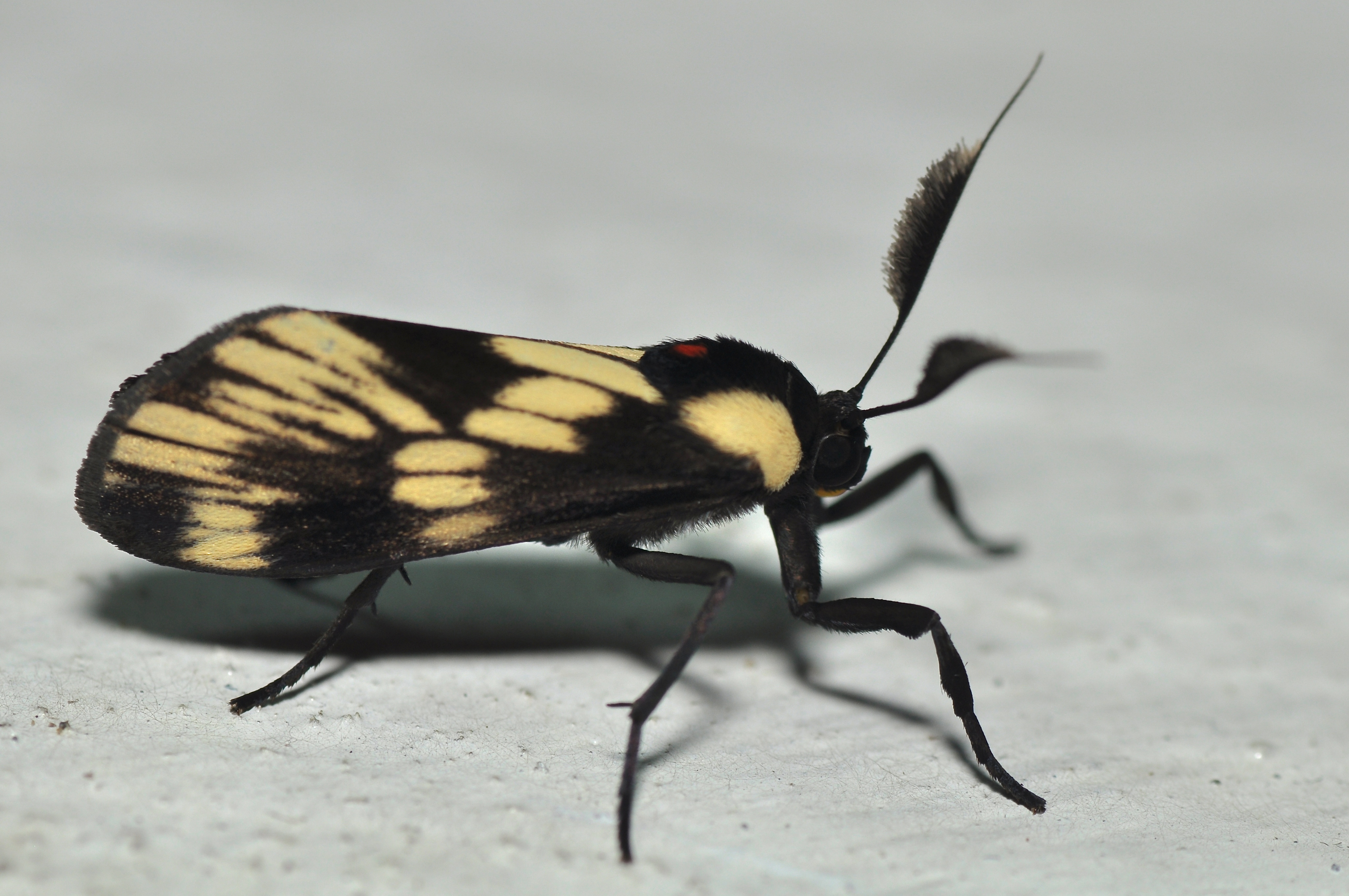

Scientific classification
- Kingdom: Animalia
- Phylum: Arthropoda
- Class: Insecta
- Order: Lepidoptera
- Superfamily: Noctuoidea
- Family: Erebidae
- Subfamily: Arctiinae
- Tribe: Lithosiini
- Genus: Ardonea; Walker, 1854

= Ardonea =

Genus of moths

Ardonea is a genus of moths in the subfamily Arctiinae.

== Species ==
- Ardonea judaphila Schaus, 1905
- Ardonea metallica Schaus, 1892
- Ardonea morio Walker, 1854
- Ardonea nigella Dognin, 1905
- Ardonea rosada Dognin, 1894
- Ardonea tenebrosa Walker, 1864
