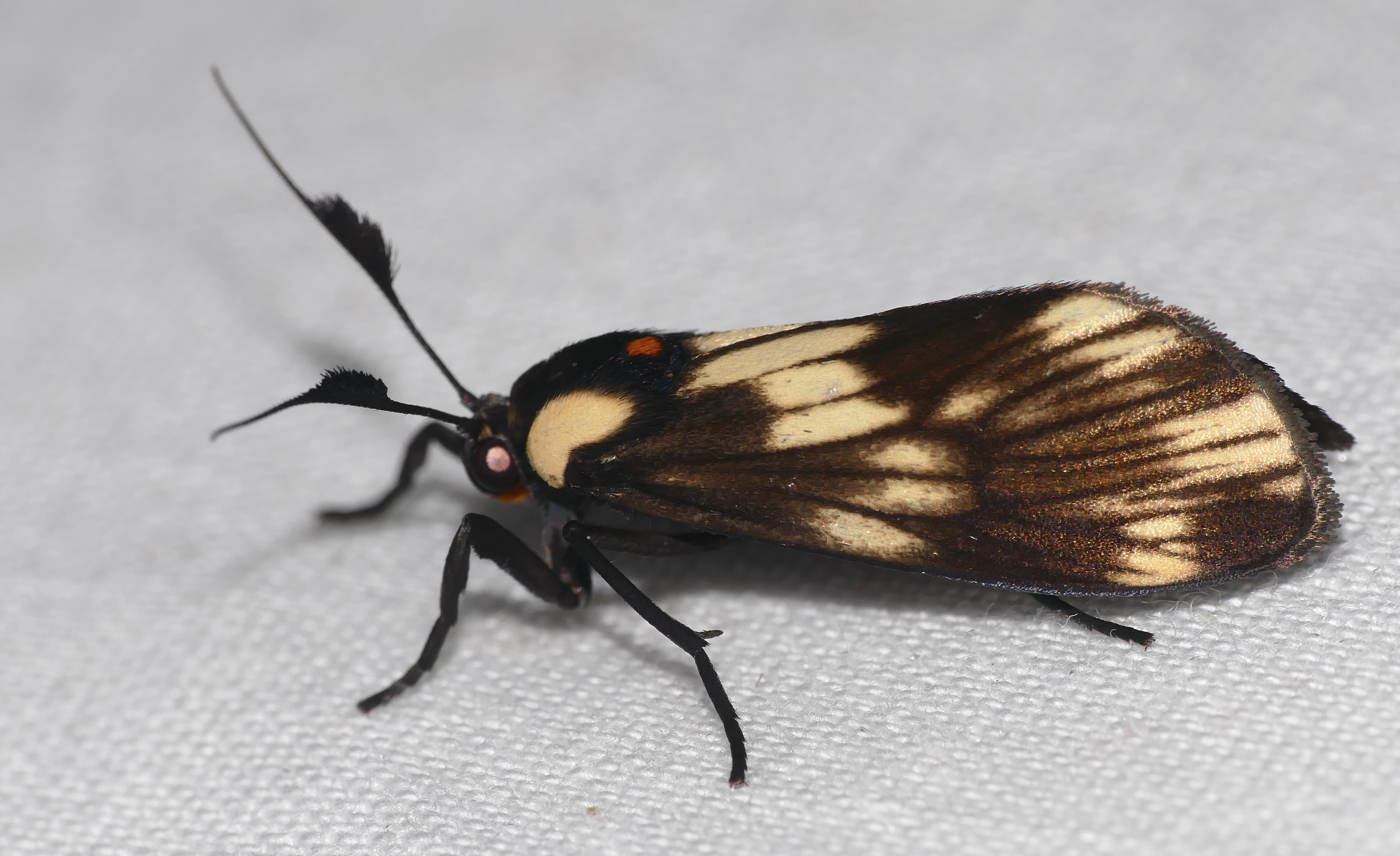

Scientific classification
- Kingdom: Animalia
- Phylum: Arthropoda
- Class: Insecta
- Order: Lepidoptera
- Superfamily: Noctuoidea
- Family: Erebidae
- Subfamily: Arctiinae
- Genus: Ardonea
- Species: A. tenebrosa

Binomial name
- Ardonea tenebrosa (Walker, 1864)

Synonyms
- Carales tenebrosa Walker, [1865]; Ardonea tenebrosa f. cubitalis Bryk, 1953; Dipaena peculiaris Druce, 1906

= Ardonea tenebrosa =

Species of moth

Ardonea tenebrosa is a moth of the subfamily Arctiinae. It was described by Francis Walker in 1864. It is found in Rio de Janeiro, Brazil.
