= Ardonea morio =

Scientific classification
- Kingdom: Animalia
- Phylum: Arthropoda
- Class: Insecta
- Order: Lepidoptera
- Superfamily: Noctuoidea
- Family: Erebidae
- Subfamily: Arctiinae
- Genus: Ardonea
- Species: A. morio

Binomial name
- Ardonea morio Walker, 1854

Synonyms
- Doracis coracina Boisduval, 1870; Scepsis unicolor Felder, 1874

Species of moth

Ardonea morio is a moth of the subfamily Arctiinae. It was described by Francis Walker in 1854. It is found in Mexico, Guatemala, Honduras, Panama, Colombia and Venezuela.
