= Ophiolechia contrasta =

Scientific classification
- Kingdom: Animalia
- Phylum: Arthropoda
- Class: Insecta
- Order: Lepidoptera
- Family: Gelechiidae
- Genus: Ophiolechia
- Species: O. contrasta

Binomial name
- Ophiolechia contrasta Sattler, 1996

Species of moth

Ophiolechia contrasta is a moth in the family Gelechiidae. It was described by Sattler in 1996. It is found in Brazil.
