= Ophiolechia acuta =

Scientific classification
- Kingdom: Animalia
- Phylum: Arthropoda
- Class: Insecta
- Order: Lepidoptera
- Family: Gelechiidae
- Genus: Ophiolechia
- Species: O. acuta

Binomial name
- Ophiolechia acuta (Sattler, 1996)

Synonyms
- Ophiolecia acuta Sattler, 1996

Species of moth

Ophiolechia acuta is a moth in the family Gelechiidae. It was described by Sattler in 1996. It is found in Argentina.
