= Ophiolechia arida =

Scientific classification
- Domain: Eukaryota
- Kingdom: Animalia
- Phylum: Arthropoda
- Class: Insecta
- Order: Lepidoptera
- Family: Gelechiidae
- Genus: Ophiolechia
- Species: O. arida

Binomial name
- Ophiolechia arida Sattler, 1996

Species of insect

Ophiolechia arida is a moth in the family Gelechiidae. It was described by Sattler in 1996. It is found in Brazil.
