= Ophiolechia =

Scientific classification
- Kingdom: Animalia
- Phylum: Arthropoda
- Clade: Pancrustacea
- Class: Insecta
- Order: Lepidoptera
- Family: Gelechiidae
- Subfamily: Gelechiinae
- Genus: Ophiolechia; Sattler, 1996

Genus of moths

Ophiolechia is a genus of moths in the family Gelechiidae of neotropical distribution. These species are known to occur in Brazil, Paraguay and Argentina.

== Species ==
- Ophiolechia acuta Sattler, 1996
- Ophiolechia allomorpha Sattler, 1996
- Ophiolechia arida Sattler, 1996
- Ophiolechia contrasta Sattler, 1996 (Type species)
- Ophiolechia crassipennis Sattler, 1996
- Ophiolechia divisa Sattler, 1996
- Ophiolechia marginata Sattler, 1996
- Ophiolechia ophiomima Sattler, 1996
- Ophiolechia ophiomorpha (Meyrick, 1935)
- Ophiolechia pertinens (Meyrick, 1931)
- Ophiolechia semiochrea Sattler, 1996
- Ophiolechia spinifera Sattler, 1996
- Ophiolechia stulta Sattler, 1996
- Ophiolechia triangula Sattler, 1996
