= Ophiolechia ophiomorpha =

Scientific classification
- Kingdom: Animalia
- Phylum: Arthropoda
- Class: Insecta
- Order: Lepidoptera
- Family: Gelechiidae
- Genus: Ophiolechia
- Species: O. ophiomorpha

Binomial name
- Ophiolechia ophiomorpha (Meyrick, 1935)

Synonyms
- Gelechia ophiomorpha Meyrick, 1935

Species of moth

Ophiolechia ophiomorpha is a moth in the family Gelechiidae. It was described by Edward Meyrick in 1935. It is found in Argentina.
