= Ophiolechia pertinens =

Scientific classification
- Kingdom: Animalia
- Phylum: Arthropoda
- Class: Insecta
- Order: Lepidoptera
- Family: Gelechiidae
- Genus: Ophiolechia
- Species: O. pertinens

Binomial name
- Ophiolechia pertinens (Meyrick, 1931)

Synonyms
- Gelechia pertinens Meyrick, 1931

Species of moth

Ophiolechia pertinens is a moth in the family Gelechiidae. It was described by Edward Meyrick in 1931. It is found in Paraguay.
