= Hypareva =

Scientific classification
- Kingdom: Animalia
- Phylum: Arthropoda
- Class: Insecta
- Order: Lepidoptera
- Superfamily: Noctuoidea
- Family: Erebidae
- Subfamily: Arctiinae
- Tribe: Lithosiini
- Genus: Hypareva; Hampson, 1900

Genus of moths

Hypareva is a genus of moths in the subfamily Arctiinae. The genus was erected by George Hampson in 1900.

== Species ==
- Hypareva pogonoda Hampson, 1900
- Hypareva laticilia (Druce, 1885)
