= Areva subfulgens =

Scientific classification
- Domain: Eukaryota
- Kingdom: Animalia
- Phylum: Arthropoda
- Class: Insecta
- Order: Lepidoptera
- Superfamily: Noctuoidea
- Family: Erebidae
- Subfamily: Arctiinae
- Genus: Areva
- Species: A. subfulgens

Binomial name
- Areva subfulgens (Schaus, 1896)

Synonyms
- Illice subfulgens Schaus, 1896

Species of moth

Areva subfulgens is a moth of the subfamily Arctiinae. It was described by Schaus in 1896. It is found in São Paulo, Brazil.
