= Areva trigemmis =

Scientific classification
- Kingdom: Animalia
- Phylum: Arthropoda
- Clade: Pancrustacea
- Class: Insecta
- Order: Lepidoptera
- Superfamily: Noctuoidea
- Family: Erebidae
- Subfamily: Arctiinae
- Genus: Areva
- Species: A. trigemmis

Binomial name
- Areva trigemmis Hübner, 1827

Synonyms
- Trichromia trigemmis Hübner, [1824-1831]; Lithosia ziza Druce, 1897

Species of moth

Areva trigemmis is a moth of the subfamily Arctiinae. It was described by Jacob Hübner in 1827. It is found in Mexico, Haiti and Espírito Santo, Brazil.
