= Areva albogrisea =

Scientific classification
- Domain: Eukaryota
- Kingdom: Animalia
- Phylum: Arthropoda
- Class: Insecta
- Order: Lepidoptera
- Superfamily: Noctuoidea
- Family: Erebidae
- Subfamily: Arctiinae
- Genus: Areva
- Species: A. albogrisea

Binomial name
- Areva albogrisea Rothschild, 1912

Species of moth

Areva albogrisea is a moth of the subfamily Arctiinae. It was described by Rothschild in 1912. It is found in Ecuador.
