= Areva (moth) =

Scientific classification
- Kingdom: Animalia
- Phylum: Arthropoda
- Class: Insecta
- Order: Lepidoptera
- Superfamily: Noctuoidea
- Family: Erebidae
- Subfamily: Arctiinae
- Tribe: Lithosiini
- Genus: Areva; Walker, 1854

Genus of moths

Areva is a genus of moths in the subfamily Arctiinae.

== Species ==
- Areva albogrisea Rothschild, 1912
- Areva laticilia Walker, 1854
- Areva subfulgens Schaus, 1896
- Areva trigemmis Hübner, 1827
