= Hypareva pogonoda =

Scientific classification
- Kingdom: Animalia
- Phylum: Arthropoda
- Class: Insecta
- Order: Lepidoptera
- Superfamily: Noctuoidea
- Family: Erebidae
- Subfamily: Arctiinae
- Genus: Hypareva
- Species: H. pogonoda

Binomial name
- Hypareva pogonoda Hampson, 1900

Species of moth

Hypareva pogonoda is a moth of the subfamily Arctiinae. It was described by George Hampson in 1900. It is found in Mexico, Guatemala, Panama and French Guiana.
