= Areva laticilia =

Scientific classification
- Kingdom: Animalia
- Phylum: Arthropoda
- Class: Insecta
- Order: Lepidoptera
- Superfamily: Noctuoidea
- Family: Erebidae
- Subfamily: Arctiinae
- Genus: Areva
- Species: A. laticilia

Binomial name
- Areva laticilia Walker, 1854

Synonyms
- Areva jubata Felder, 1875

Species of moth

Areva laticilia is a moth of the subfamily Arctiinae. It was described by Francis Walker in 1854. It is found in Venezuela.
