= Tortriculladia pentaspila =

Scientific classification
- Kingdom: Animalia
- Phylum: Arthropoda
- Clade: Pancrustacea
- Class: Insecta
- Order: Lepidoptera
- Family: Crambidae
- Subfamily: Crambinae
- Tribe: Crambini
- Genus: Tortriculladia
- Species: T. pentaspila

Binomial name
- Tortriculladia pentaspila (Zeller, 1877)

Synonyms
- Argyria pentaspila Zeller, 1877

Species of moth

Tortriculladia pentaspila is a moth in the family Crambidae. It was described by Zeller in 1877, and is found in Brazil.
