= Tortriculladia eucosmella =

Scientific classification
- Kingdom: Animalia
- Phylum: Arthropoda
- Class: Insecta
- Order: Lepidoptera
- Family: Crambidae
- Subfamily: Crambinae
- Tribe: Crambini
- Genus: Tortriculladia
- Species: T. eucosmella

Binomial name
- Tortriculladia eucosmella (Dyar, 1914)

Synonyms
- Culladia eucosmella Dyar, 1914; Crambus argyriplagalis Hampson, 1919

Species of moth

Tortriculladia eucosmella is a moth in the family Crambidae. It was described by Harrison Gray Dyar Jr. in 1914. It is found in Panama and Suriname.
