= Tortriculladia mixena =

Scientific classification
- Domain: Eukaryota
- Kingdom: Animalia
- Phylum: Arthropoda
- Class: Insecta
- Order: Lepidoptera
- Family: Crambidae
- Subfamily: Crambinae
- Tribe: Crambini
- Genus: Tortriculladia
- Species: T. mixena

Binomial name
- Tortriculladia mixena Błeszyński, 1967

Species of moth

Tortriculladia mixena is a moth in the family Crambidae. The moth was described by Stanisław Błeszyński in 1967. It is found in Peru.
