= Tortriculladia =

Scientific classification
- Domain: Eukaryota
- Kingdom: Animalia
- Phylum: Arthropoda
- Class: Insecta
- Order: Lepidoptera
- Family: Crambidae
- Tribe: Crambini
- Genus: Tortriculladia; Bleszynski, 1967

Genus of moths

Tortriculladia is a genus of moths of the family Crambidae.

== Species ==
- Tortriculladia argentimaculalis (Hampson, 1919)
- Tortriculladia belliferens (Dyar, 1914)
- Tortriculladia eucosmella (Dyar, 1914)
- Tortriculladia mignonette (Dyar, 1914)
- Tortriculladia mixena Bleszynski, 1967
- Tortriculladia pentaspila (Zeller, 1877)
