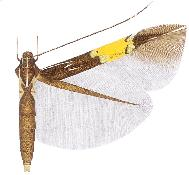

Scientific classification
- Kingdom: Animalia
- Phylum: Arthropoda
- Class: Insecta
- Order: Lepidoptera
- Family: Cosmopterigidae
- Genus: Cosmopterix
- Species: C. isotoma

Binomial name
- Cosmopterix isotoma Meyrick, 1915

= Cosmopterix isotoma =

Species of moth

Cosmopterix isotoma is a moth of the family Cosmopterigidae. It is known from the Federal District and Pará in Brazil and from Guyana.

Adults have been recorded in February, April and July, indicating more than one generation.

== Description ==
Male, female. Forewing length 3.2-3.9 mm. Head: frons shining pale ochreous-grey with greenish and reddish reflections, vertex and neck tufts shining dark brown with greenish and reddish reflections, laterally lined white and with a trace of a white median line, collar shining dark brown; labial palpus first segment very short, greyish white, second segment three-quarters of the length of third, dark brown with white longitudinal lines laterally and ventrally, third segment white, lined dark brown laterally, extreme apex white; scape dorsally shining dark brown with a white anterior line, ventrally shining white, antenna shining dark brown with a white interrupted line from base to about one-half, near base partly uninterrupted, followed towards apex by eight dark brown segments, two white, two dark brown, two white, ten dark brown and seven white segments at apex. Thorax and tegulae shining dark brown with reddish gloss, thorax with a white median line, tegulae lined white inwardly. Legs: shining dark brown, femora shining pale golden, foreleg with a white line on tibia and tarsal segments, tibia of midleg with white oblique basal and a medial lines and a white apical ring, tarsal segments one and two with white apical rings, segment five entirely white, tibia of hindleg as midleg, but with an additional pale golden subapical ring, tarsal segments one to three with ochreous-brown apical rings, tarsal segments four and five entirely white, spurs whitish dorsally, brown ventrally. Forewing shining dark brown, three narrow white lines in the basal area, a subcostal from base to one-quarter and gradually bending from costa, a very short medial ending with the subcostal, a subdorsal as short as the medial but slightly further from base, some traces of white scaling on dorsum beyond base, a bright dark yellow transverse fascia beyond the middle, narrowing towards dorsum and with a very short apical protrusion, bordered at the inner edge by two tubercular golden metallic subcostal and dorsal spots, the subcostal spot with a patch of blackish scales on the outside, the dorsal spot further from base than the subcostal, bordered at the outer edge by two tubercular golden metallic costal and dorsal spots, the dorsal spot more than twice as large as the costal, both spots inwardly lined dark brown, the outer costal spot outwardly edged by a whitish costal streak, a narrow shining silvery white apical line with bluish gloss from beyond the apical protrusion, interrupted in the middle and shining white in the apical cilia, cilia dark brown, greyish brown towards dorsum. Hindwing shining dark greyish brown, cilia dark greyish brown. Underside: forewing shining dark greyish brown with the white costal streak and apical line in the cilia at apex distinctly visible, hindwing shining dark greyish brown. Abdomen dorsally brown, ventrally dark greyish brown with a broad white longitudinal streak in the middle, segments banded shining white posteriorly, anal tuft ochreous-grey.
