= Atyphopsis roseiceps =

Scientific classification
- Domain: Eukaryota
- Kingdom: Animalia
- Phylum: Arthropoda
- Class: Insecta
- Order: Lepidoptera
- Superfamily: Noctuoidea
- Family: Erebidae
- Subfamily: Arctiinae
- Genus: Atyphopsis
- Species: A. roseiceps

Binomial name
- Atyphopsis roseiceps H. Druce, 1898

Species of moth

Atyphopsis roseiceps is a moth of the subfamily Arctiinae. It was described by Herbert Druce in 1898. It is found in Rio de Janeiro, Brazil.
