= Atyphopsis modesta =

Scientific classification
- Domain: Eukaryota
- Kingdom: Animalia
- Phylum: Arthropoda
- Class: Insecta
- Order: Lepidoptera
- Superfamily: Noctuoidea
- Family: Erebidae
- Subfamily: Arctiinae
- Genus: Atyphopsis
- Species: A. modesta

Binomial name
- Atyphopsis modesta Butler, 1887

Species of moth

Atyphopsis modesta is a moth of the subfamily Arctiinae. It was described by Arthur Gardiner Butler in 1887. It is found in the Amazon region.
