= Atyphopsis obscura =

Scientific classification
- Kingdom: Animalia
- Phylum: Arthropoda
- Clade: Pancrustacea
- Class: Insecta
- Order: Lepidoptera
- Superfamily: Noctuoidea
- Family: Erebidae
- Subfamily: Arctiinae
- Genus: Atyphopsis
- Species: A. obscura

Binomial name
- Atyphopsis obscura Hampson, 1887

Species of moth

Atyphopsis obscura is a moth in the subfamily Arctiinae. It was described by George Hampson in 1887. It is found in the Espírito Santo, Brazil.
