= Atyphopsis =

Scientific classification
- Domain: Eukaryota
- Kingdom: Animalia
- Phylum: Arthropoda
- Class: Insecta
- Order: Lepidoptera
- Superfamily: Noctuoidea
- Family: Erebidae
- Subfamily: Arctiinae
- Genus: Atyphopsis; Butler, 1878

Genus of moths

Atyphopsis is a genus of moths in the subfamily Arctiinae. The genus was erected by Arthur Gardiner Butler in 1878.

== Species ==
- Atyphopsis modesta Butler, 1887
- Atyphopsis roseiceps Druce, 1898
- Atyphopsis obscura Hampson, 1898
