= Antaeotricha orthriopa =

Scientific classification
- Domain: Eukaryota
- Kingdom: Animalia
- Phylum: Arthropoda
- Class: Insecta
- Order: Lepidoptera
- Family: Depressariidae
- Genus: Antaeotricha
- Species: A. orthriopa

Binomial name
- Antaeotricha orthriopa Meyrick, 1925

Species of moth

Antaeotricha orthriopa is a species of moth in the family Depressariidae. It was described by Edward Meyrick in 1925. It is found in Brazil.

The wingspan is about 16 mm. The forewings are white with the costal edge greyish from the base to beyond one-fourth, with a darker spot at the extremity and a slight greyish projection midway between this and the base. There are small faint greyish median and subdorsal spots near the base and a rather large oval blackish spot in the disc at one-third, beneath this three irregular subdorsal spots of pale grey suffusion sprinkled blackish. Some pale grey suffusion is found in the middle of the disc, and a larger blotch towards the middle of the dorsum, as well as two greyish dots transversely placed on the end of the cell. There are quadrate blotches of irregular dark grey mottling on the costa at two-thirds and the dorsum towards the tornus, representing a fascia broadly interrupted in the middle. There is also a dentate white marginal line around the apex, edged dark fuscous and preceded by some fuscous irroration. The hindwings are white, with an oblique dark grey mark from the costa just before the apex and with the costa dilated on the anterior two-thirds, with a dense projecting fringe of white and grey scales. The costal third from the base to beyond the middle is pale ochreous-yellowish, with long expansible whitish hairs.
