= Adoxosia excisa =

Scientific classification
- Kingdom: Animalia
- Phylum: Arthropoda
- Class: Insecta
- Order: Lepidoptera
- Superfamily: Noctuoidea
- Family: Erebidae
- Subfamily: Arctiinae
- Genus: Adoxosia
- Species: A. excisa

Binomial name
- Adoxosia excisa Hampson, 1900

Species of moth

Adoxosia excisa is a moth of the subfamily Arctiinae. It is found in Brazil.
