= Adoxosia nydiana =

Scientific classification
- Domain: Eukaryota
- Kingdom: Animalia
- Phylum: Arthropoda
- Class: Insecta
- Order: Lepidoptera
- Superfamily: Noctuoidea
- Family: Erebidae
- Subfamily: Arctiinae
- Genus: Adoxosia
- Species: A. nydiana

Binomial name
- Adoxosia nydiana Schaus, 1929

Species of moth

Adoxosia nydiana is a species of moth of the subfamily Arctiinae. It is found in Brazil.
