= Antaeotricha aglypta =

Scientific classification
- Kingdom: Animalia
- Phylum: Arthropoda
- Clade: Pancrustacea
- Class: Insecta
- Order: Lepidoptera
- Family: Depressariidae
- Genus: Antaeotricha
- Species: A. aglypta

Binomial name
- Antaeotricha aglypta Meyrick, 1925

Species of moth in genus Antaeotricha

Antaeotricha aglypta is a species of moth in the family Depressariidae. It was described by Edward Meyrick in 1925. It is found in Guyana and Brazil.

The wingspan is 14–16 mm. The forewings are whitish-ochreous, the dorsal half tinged and speckled fuscous with from just beneath the basal half of the costa a very dense downwards directed brushlike fringe of very long whitish-ochreous hairscales. There is a dark fuscous mark from the base of the costa, and a plical dash from near base to one-third. The stigmata are moderate and dark fuscous, the plical elongate, obliquely beyond the first discal, and there is an oblique dark fuscous line from the middle of the costa to the second discal. There are indistinct oblique triangular spots of dark fuscous suffusion from the dorsum beyond the middle and towards the tornus, as well as a thick dark fuscous sometimes interrupted line from the costa at two-thirds to near the termen above the tornus, the dorsal area between this and the preceding more infuscated. Six dark fuscous or blackish dots are found around the apex and termen, the largest at the apex. The hindwings are light grey, darker posteriorly and with an ochreous-whitish subcostal expansible hairpencil from the base to two-thirds.
