= Antaeotricha nitescens =

Scientific classification
- Domain: Eukaryota
- Kingdom: Animalia
- Phylum: Arthropoda
- Class: Insecta
- Order: Lepidoptera
- Family: Depressariidae
- Genus: Antaeotricha
- Species: A. nitescens

Binomial name
- Antaeotricha nitescens Meyrick, 1925

Species of moth

Antaeotricha nitescens is a species of moth in the family Depressariidae. It was described by Edward Meyrick in 1925. It is found in Brazil (Para).

The wingspan is about 17 mm. The forewings are shining white with a fine dark fuscous transverse mark at the base of the costa and two dark fuscous dorsal blotches, the first irregular, extending from near the base to the middle, the anterior half broader and reaching half across the wing, the second oblong, extending from two-thirds to the tornus, reaching half across the wing. There are cloudy fuscous dots in the disc at one-fourth towards the costa, and before the middle. An oblique dark fuscous line is found from the costa beyond the middle not reaching half across the wing, and one slightly curved from the costa at two-thirds to the posterior angle of the second dorsal blotch. There are five black dots around the apical margin and two very minute lower on the termen, preceded by a spot of dark fuscous suffusion at the apex and small cloudy fuscous spots beneath. The hindwings are whitish, the posterior third suffused pale grey except towards the costa, with three dark grey marginal marks around the apex. The costa is rather dilated on the basal two-thirds, and there is a group of long expansible yellow-whitish subcostal hairs extending from the base to near the apex.
