= Antaeotricha tornogramma =

Scientific classification
- Domain: Eukaryota
- Kingdom: Animalia
- Phylum: Arthropoda
- Class: Insecta
- Order: Lepidoptera
- Family: Depressariidae
- Genus: Antaeotricha
- Species: A. tornogramma

Binomial name
- Antaeotricha tornogramma Meyrick, 1925

Species of moth

Antaeotricha tornogramma is a moth in the family Depressariidae. It was described by Edward Meyrick in 1925. It is found in Brazil.

The wingspan is about 15 mm. The forewings are white, on dorsal three-fifths slightly tinged ochreous and irregularly sprinkled fuscous and with a longitudinal dark fuscous dash from the base of the costa. There is some dark fuscous suffusion towards the dorsum before the middle, an oblique series of three indistinct fuscous dashes crossing the disc above this and a very oblique dark fuscous line from the costa before the middle to the upper angle of the cell, as well as a cloudy dot on the lower angle. A curved dark fuscous line is found from the costa at two-thirds to the tornus, limiting a quadrate fuscous pre-tornal blotch reaching half across the wing. There is a black marginal line on the apex and upper part of the termen and one or two dots above it, some slight fuscous suffusion preceding it at the apex. The hindwings are ochreous-whitish, near the termen slightly greyish-tinged except towards the costa, and with two slight dark grey marginal marks at the apex. The costa is hardly dilated. There is a pale yellowish subcostal hairpencil from the base reaching nearly to the apex.
