= Antaeotricha acrograpta =

Scientific classification
- Kingdom: Animalia
- Phylum: Arthropoda
- Clade: Pancrustacea
- Class: Insecta
- Order: Lepidoptera
- Family: Depressariidae
- Genus: Antaeotricha
- Species: A. acrograpta

Binomial name
- Antaeotricha acrograpta (Meyrick, 1915)

Synonyms
- Aphanoxena acrograpta Meyrick, 1915

Species of moth in genus Antaeotricha

Antaeotricha acrograpta is a species of moth of the family Depressariidae. It is found in French Guiana, Guyana and Brazil.

The wingspan is about 16 mm. The forewings are white with a small grey spot on the costa beyond one-fourth, a dot on the fold near the base, and one beneath the fold at one-third. There is an irregular patch of light grey suffusion in the middle of the disc and an oval blackish spot on the upper angle of the cell, as well as a small dot beneath its posterior extremity. There is also an irregular fuscous spot, on the costa above this, where an irregular line right-angled inwards beneath the costa and then obtuse-angled outwards runs to the tornus, where it forms the posterior edge of an irregular dorsal blotch. There are about five blackish pre-marginal dots around the apex, preceded by some slight fuscous suffusion. The hindwings are whitish, tinged with fuscous and with the costal margin expanded on the anterior half, with rough projecting hairscales suffused with dark fuscous beneath, and a subcostal groove containing some long whitish hairs. There is also a dark fuscous mark from the costa just before the apex.
