= Antaeotricha stringens =

Scientific classification
- Domain: Eukaryota
- Kingdom: Animalia
- Phylum: Arthropoda
- Class: Insecta
- Order: Lepidoptera
- Family: Depressariidae
- Genus: Antaeotricha
- Species: A. stringens

Binomial name
- Antaeotricha stringens Meyrick, 1925

Species of moth

Antaeotricha stringens is a moth in the family Depressariidae. It was described by Edward Meyrick in 1925. It is found in Brazil.

The wingspan is about 21 mm. The forewings are shining white, with the markings rather dark grey and a median dash near the base, as well as a thick subdorsal streak from near the base to two-fifths, expanded downwards in the middle to rest on the dorsum. There is an irregular streak from the costa at one-fourth to a quadrate blotch on the dorsum beyond the middle. There is a second discal stigma forming a small transverse mark and an irregular rather curved streak from above the middle of the disc passing just beyond this to a transverse pre-tornal spot narrowed on the dorsum. A somewhat curved dentate streak (or series of confluent marks) is found from three-fourths of the costa to the tornus but widely interrupted beneath the costa. A marginal streak of three or four confluent spots is found on the apex and upper part of the termen, widest at the apex. The hindwings are light grey, whitish-tinged near the base, the costa suffused white posteriorly and the costa expanded on the basal half, with a projecting tuft of dark grey hairscales before the middle, and a yellowish-tinged subcostal groove with a few short whitish hairs at the base.
