= Antaeotricha sellifera =

Scientific classification
- Kingdom: Animalia
- Phylum: Arthropoda
- Clade: Pancrustacea
- Class: Insecta
- Order: Lepidoptera
- Family: Depressariidae
- Genus: Antaeotricha
- Species: A. sellifera

Binomial name
- Antaeotricha sellifera Meyrick, 1925

Species of moth

Antaeotricha sellifera is a species of moth belonging to the Depressariidae family. It was described by Edward Meyrick in 1925. It is found in Brazil.

The wingspan is about 15 mm. The forewings are ochreous-white with a dark fuscous basal patch occupying one-fourth of the wing, streaked blackish on the fold, the edge rather convex and somewhat projecting above and below the middle, the dorsal edge brownish. There is a grey patch extending on the dorsum from before the middle to near the tornus, the anterior half not reaching the middle, the posterior half reaching two-thirds across the wing, the second discal stigma forming a strong transverse black spot placed in the angle of this, and a series of three cloudy blackish-grey spots surrounding this behind and beneath and continued by three smaller irregular spots towards the costa before the middle. A marginal series of blackish linear marks is found around the posterior half of the costa and termen, with some slight grey suffusion around the apex. The hindwings are light grey, the apex slenderly white, with two small dark fuscous marginal marks. The costa is expanded on the basal half, with a strong projecting fringe of white and grey scales and a whitish subcostal hairpencil reaching to beyond the middle lying beneath the forewings.
