= Antaeotricha resiliens =

Scientific classification
- Domain: Eukaryota
- Kingdom: Animalia
- Phylum: Arthropoda
- Class: Insecta
- Order: Lepidoptera
- Family: Depressariidae
- Genus: Antaeotricha
- Species: A. resiliens

Binomial name
- Antaeotricha resiliens Meyrick, 1925

Species of moth

Antaeotricha resiliens is a moth in the family Depressariidae. It was described by Edward Meyrick in 1925. It is found in Brazil.

The wingspan is about 13 mm. The forewings are ochreous-white, with slight irregular very fine greyish speckling or suffusion, the costal edge clear and with a dark fuscous longitudinal line from the base of the costa to one-fifth. There are three trapezoidal grey dorsal blotches reaching nearly half across the wing, the first towards the base, the second median, the third pre-tornal, much expanded upwards. Three very oblique dark fuscous streaks are found from just beneath the costal edge, the first suffused, irregular, from one-fifth to the anterior angle of the second blotch, the second similar, from before the middle to the anterior angle of the third blotch, the third well-marked, linear, slightly curved, from two-thirds to the posterior angle of the third blotch, making an abrupt angle with the posterior side of the blotch. Seven blackish marginal dots are found around the apex and termen. The hindwings are light grey with the costa slightly expanded anteriorly, a pale greyish-ochreous subcostal hairpencil from the base to the middle.
