= Antaeotricha xuthosaris =

Scientific classification
- Domain: Eukaryota
- Kingdom: Animalia
- Phylum: Arthropoda
- Class: Insecta
- Order: Lepidoptera
- Family: Depressariidae
- Genus: Antaeotricha
- Species: A. xuthosaris

Binomial name
- Antaeotricha xuthosaris Meyrick, 1925

Species of moth

Antaeotricha xuthosaris is a moth in the family Depressariidae. It was described by Edward Meyrick in 1925. It is found in Brazil.

The wingspan is about 19 mm. The forewings are pale greyish-ochreous suffused white except towards the base and the dorsal expansion. There are three cloudy ochreous-grey hardly curved lines from just below the costal edge, the first from one-fifth to a cloudy suffused dark fuscous blotch on the middle of the dorsum, the second from before the middle to an oblique-triangular suffused dark fuscous spot on the dorsum at four-fifths, the second discal stigma perceptible on this, the third from three-fourths to the tornus. There are five blackish terminal dots, longitudinal ochreous-grey marks preceding and alternating with these. The hindwings are grey, towards the base whitish-hyaline with the costa slightly dilated anteriorly, with a strong projecting fringe of dark grey hairscales from the base to two-fifths, on the lower surface a dark grey costal patch beneath this. There is a fulvous subcostal hairpencil from the base not reaching the middle.
