= Antaeotricha planicoma =

Scientific classification
- Domain: Eukaryota
- Kingdom: Animalia
- Phylum: Arthropoda
- Class: Insecta
- Order: Lepidoptera
- Family: Depressariidae
- Genus: Antaeotricha
- Species: A. planicoma

Binomial name
- Antaeotricha planicoma (Meyrick, 1925)

Synonyms
- Stenoma planicoma Meyrick, 1925

Species of moth

Antaeotricha planicoma is a species of moth of the family Depressariidae. It is found in Pará, Brazil.

The wingspan is about 18 mm. The forewings are white with a short irregular dark fuscous subdorsal line from the middle of the base, the dorsal area between this and next the line tinged pale fuscous. There are three somewhat irregular oblique dark fuscous lines from beneath the costal edge, the first almost straight from before one-fourth to the middle of the dorsum, the second from the middle somewhat sinuate in the disc to the dorsum at three-fourths, the third from three-fourths rather curved on the lower half to the tornus, the space between the second and third pale grey on the dorsal half. A marginal series of blackish dots is found around the posterior part of the costa and termen. The hindwings are whitish, the costa strongly expanded on the anterior half, expansion fringed with white scales and clothed on the lower surface with closely appressed long ochreous-whitish hairs. There is an ochreous-yellowish subcostal streak reaching the middle.
