= Antaeotricha sterrhomitra =

Scientific classification
- Domain: Eukaryota
- Kingdom: Animalia
- Phylum: Arthropoda
- Class: Insecta
- Order: Lepidoptera
- Family: Depressariidae
- Genus: Antaeotricha
- Species: A. sterrhomitra

Binomial name
- Antaeotricha sterrhomitra (Meyrick, 1925)

Synonyms
- Stenoma sterrhomitra Meyrick, 1925

Species of moth

Antaeotricha sterrhomitra is a moth of the family Depressariidae. It is found in Brazil (Amazonas).

The wingspan is 12–13 mm. The forewings are white, partially slightly tinged or speckled fuscous and with a dark fuscous basal dot in the middle. The first discal stigma and plical are obliquely beyond it. They are rather large, dark fuscous, and there is usually a cloudy mark on the costa at one-fourth, sometimes all united by a streak of fuscous suffusion. A slightly curved somewhat irregular dark fuscous streak is found from the costa at three-fifths to the dorsum at three-fourths, in females rather thick, suffused posteriorly. There is also a hardly curved dark fuscous streak from the costa towards the apex to the termen above the tornus and there are four dark fuscous dots around the apex and upper part of the termen. The hindwings are ochreous-whitish in males and grey in females.
