= Antaeotricha synercta =

Scientific classification
- Domain: Eukaryota
- Kingdom: Animalia
- Phylum: Arthropoda
- Class: Insecta
- Order: Lepidoptera
- Family: Depressariidae
- Genus: Antaeotricha
- Species: A. synercta

Binomial name
- Antaeotricha synercta Meyrick, 1925

Species of moth

Antaeotricha synercta is a moth in the family Depressariidae. It was described by Edward Meyrick in 1925. It is found in Brazil.

The wingspan is about 17 mm. The forewings are white, the dorsal area tinged fuscous and with fine blackish supramedian and subdorsal dashes near the base. A similar dash represents the plical stigma, and a fuscous dash in the disc is found obliquely before this. There is a very oblique suffused dark fuscous line from the middle of the costa towards the second discal stigma but interrupted on both sides of it, then to the dorsum near the tornus, and a straight dark fuscous line from a very oblique black mark on the costa at three-fourths to the tornus, the space between these tinged fuscous on the costal third and forming a light fuscous blotch on the tornus. Six blackish dots are found around the apex and termen. The hindwings are whitish, tinged grey posteriorly and with the costa rather expanded from the base to near the apex, a whitish subcostal hairpencil from the base to three-fourths.
