= Antaeotricha cleopatra =

Scientific classification
- Domain: Eukaryota
- Kingdom: Animalia
- Phylum: Arthropoda
- Class: Insecta
- Order: Lepidoptera
- Family: Depressariidae
- Genus: Antaeotricha
- Species: A. cleopatra

Binomial name
- Antaeotricha cleopatra Meyrick, 1925

Species of moth

Antaeotricha cleopatra is a moth in the family Depressariidae. It was described by Edward Meyrick in 1925. It is endemic to Brazil.

The wingspan is about 15 millimetres (0.59 in). The forewings are shining white with the costal edge light grey on the basal fourth, from the extremity a light grey irregular interrupted shade to the middle of the dorsum. The second discal stigma is large, oval and black and there is a slightly curved fuscous fascia from two-thirds of the costa to the dorsum before the tornus, narrowed towards the costa and darkest on the costal edge, narrowly interrupted in the middle. A toothed white marginal line is found around the apex edged by five blackish dots in the excavations, and with some slight fuscous irroration before this. The hindwings are white with the costa dilated on the anterior half, with a broad projecting median tuft of dark grey and white scales, as well as a white subcostal hairpencil from the base reaching to beyond the middle, lying beneath the forewings.
