= Antaeotricha tractrix =

Scientific classification
- Domain: Eukaryota
- Kingdom: Animalia
- Phylum: Arthropoda
- Class: Insecta
- Order: Lepidoptera
- Family: Depressariidae
- Genus: Antaeotricha
- Species: A. tractrix

Binomial name
- Antaeotricha tractrix Meyrick, 1925

Species of moth

Antaeotricha tractrix is a moth in the family Depressariidae. It was described by Edward Meyrick in 1925. It is found in Brazil.

The wingspan is about 14 mm. The forewings are white, the dorsal half suffused light greyish and with some slight dark grey suffusion towards the dorsum at the base. There is an irregular interrupted oblique dark fuscous line from the costa at one-fourth towards the apex of a suffused triangular dark fuscous blotch on the middle of the dorsum, and a similar streak from the middle of the costa to the apex of a similar pre-tornal blotch, preceded in the disc by a fuscous dash confluent with it. There is a hardly curved slightly interrupted dark fuscous line from the costa at three-fourths to the tornus and there are also six rather large blackish terminal dots. The hindwings are light grey and the costa is slightly dilated anteriorly, with a pale yellowish subcostal hairpencil from the base to beyond the middle.
