= Antaeotricha tetrapetra =

Scientific classification
- Domain: Eukaryota
- Kingdom: Animalia
- Phylum: Arthropoda
- Class: Insecta
- Order: Lepidoptera
- Family: Depressariidae
- Genus: Antaeotricha
- Species: A. tetrapetra

Binomial name
- Antaeotricha tetrapetra (Meyrick, 1925)

Synonyms
- Stenoma tetrapetra Meyrick, 1925

Species of moth

Antaeotricha tetrapetra is a moth of the family Depressariidae. It is found in Brazil (Amazonas).

The wingspan is about 25 mm. The forewings are white with four rather dark grey blotches occupying most of the dorsum, not nearly reaching half across the wing, the first elongate, the second and third subquadrate, the fourth small, triangular and tornal. There is an indistinct greyish streak above the middle from near the base to one-fourth, and a stronger one in the disc from one-fifth to two-fifths. The second discal stigma is dark grey, with three greyish longitudinal marks above the cell forming a very oblique series pointing to this. There is also a short fine grey dash beyond the cell above the middle and five minute dark grey dots on the termen. The hindwings are ochreous-whitish suffused pale grey on the posterior half.
