= Antaeotricha percnocarpa =

Scientific classification
- Domain: Eukaryota
- Kingdom: Animalia
- Phylum: Arthropoda
- Class: Insecta
- Order: Lepidoptera
- Family: Depressariidae
- Genus: Antaeotricha
- Species: A. percnocarpa

Binomial name
- Antaeotricha percnocarpa (Meyrick, 1925)

Synonyms
- Stenoma percnocarpa Meyrick, 1925

Species of moth

Antaeotricha percnocarpa is a moth of the family Depressariidae. It is found in Brazil (Amazonas).

The wingspan is about 17 mm. The forewings are light brownish-ochreous with a semi-oval black blotch occupying nearly the basal third of the dorsum. The discal stigmata is moderate and blackish, the first preceded by a small dot very obliquely above it, with some oblique blackish irroration from the dorsum beyond the middle directed toward these, the second lying between an oblique series of three cloudy dots of blackish irroration from the costa beyond the middle and a rather oblique blackish transverse blotch rising from the dorsum before the tornus. There is a faint irregular curved fuscous subterminal line and a marginal series of black dots around the posterior part of the costa and termen. The hindwings are dark grey.
