= Antaeotricha carbasea =

Scientific classification
- Domain: Eukaryota
- Kingdom: Animalia
- Phylum: Arthropoda
- Class: Insecta
- Order: Lepidoptera
- Family: Depressariidae
- Genus: Antaeotricha
- Species: A. carbasea

Binomial name
- Antaeotricha carbasea (Meyrick, 1915)

Synonyms
- Stenoma carbasea Meyrick, 1915

Species of moth

Antaeotricha carbasea is a moth of the family Depressariidae. It is found in Brazil (Rio de Janeiro).

The wingspan is about 20 mm. The forewings are brown, broadly suffused with whitish-ochreous towards the anterior half of the costa and with two or three cloudy irregular dark fuscous dots obliquely placed in the disc about one-third, directed towards a transverse spot of cloudy dark fuscous suffusion from the middle of the dorsum. An irregular curved series of cloudy dark fuscous marks is found from before the middle of the costa to three-fourths of the dorsum and there is a curved row of cloudy dark fuscous dots from the costa at three-fourths to just before the tornus. There is also a series of dark fuscous marginal marks around the posterior part of the costa and termen. The hindwings are grey.
