= Antaeotricha notosaris =

Scientific classification
- Domain: Eukaryota
- Kingdom: Animalia
- Phylum: Arthropoda
- Class: Insecta
- Order: Lepidoptera
- Family: Depressariidae
- Genus: Antaeotricha
- Species: A. notosaris

Binomial name
- Antaeotricha notosaris (Meyrick, 1925)

Synonyms
- Stenoma notosaris Meyrick, 1925

Species of moth

Antaeotricha notosaris is a moth of the family Depressariidae. It is found in Pará, Brazil.

The wingspan is 14–15 mm. The forewings are shining white, the dorsal half fuscous except for an attenuated projection of a white area on the termen, the upper edge of the dorsal area including a fuscous dot in a cloudy indentation on the end of the cell. There are elongate fuscous marks in the disc above the dorsal area at one-fourth and beyond the middle and a slightly curved rather dark fuscous line from the costa at two-thirds to the angle of the dorsal area. There are also six irregular blackish marginal dots around the apex and termen, the largest at the apex. Some fuscous suffusion is found before the apex. The hindwings are fuscous-whitish with dark fuscous marginal marks on each side of the apex.
