= Antaeotricha praecisa =

Scientific classification
- Kingdom: Animalia
- Phylum: Arthropoda
- Class: Insecta
- Order: Lepidoptera
- Family: Depressariidae
- Genus: Antaeotricha
- Species: A. praecisa

Binomial name
- Antaeotricha praecisa Meyrick, 1912

Species of moth

Antaeotricha praecisa is a moth of the family Depressariidae. It is found in Brazil (Rio de Janeiro, São Paulo).

The wingspan is 20–25 mm. The forewings have a dark fuscous patch with purplish-leaden reflections and are irregularly mixed with blackish extending from the base of the costa along the dorsum to two-thirds, reaching two-thirds across the wing and posteriorly truncate, the angle edged with black. There are two irregular transverse fuscous shades beyond this, the first with the costal extremity obsolete or represented by a cloudy dot beneath the middle of the costa, the second sometimes reaching the costa at three-fourths. A third shade is indicated by a tornal mark and a small black costal spot. The hindwings are whitish-grey, in males with a subcostal pencil of long whitish hairs reaching from the base to the middle. The costal edge in males with a projection of grey scales before the middle.
