= Antaeotricha adjunctella =

Scientific classification
- Kingdom: Animalia
- Phylum: Arthropoda
- Clade: Pancrustacea
- Class: Insecta
- Order: Lepidoptera
- Family: Depressariidae
- Genus: Antaeotricha
- Species: A. adjunctella

Binomial name
- Antaeotricha adjunctella (Walker, 1864)

Synonyms
- Cryptolechia adjunctella Walker, 1864; Cryptolechia additella Walker, 1864; Cryptolechia absconditella Walker, 1864

Species of moth in genus Antaeotricha

Antaeotricha adjunctella is a moth in the family Depressariidae. It was described by Francis Walker in 1864. It is found in Amazonas in Brazil and in the Guianas.

Adults are pale cinereous (ash-gray) straw colour, the forewings with a fawn-coloured basal patch, which is accompanied by black streaks. There is a black point in the disk beyond the middle and the exterior space is fawn coloured, whitish streaked and traversed by an outward-curved whitish line. The marginal points are black and whitish bordered. The hindwings are whitish, with the exterior part tinged with pale fawn colour.
