= Antaeotricha stygeropa =

Scientific classification
- Domain: Eukaryota
- Kingdom: Animalia
- Phylum: Arthropoda
- Class: Insecta
- Order: Lepidoptera
- Family: Depressariidae
- Genus: Antaeotricha
- Species: A. stygeropa

Binomial name
- Antaeotricha stygeropa (Meyrick, 1925)

Synonyms
- Stenoma stygeropa Meyrick, 1925

Species of moth

Antaeotricha stygeropa is a moth of the family Depressariidae. It is found in Brazil (Amazonas).

The wingspan is 14–15 mm. The forewings are dark grey, with from just beneath the basal half of the costa a downwards-directed fringe of long dense grey hairscales and with three indistinct irregular suffused oblique parallel dark fuscous transverse shades, the first from beneath the costal fringe to the middle of the dorsum, the second from beyond the middle of the costa to before the tornus and the third from the costa at three-fourths to the termen above the tornus. There are cloudy dark fuscous marginal dots around the apex and termen. The hindwings are dark fuscous.
