= Antaeotricha aerinotata =

Scientific classification
- Kingdom: Animalia
- Phylum: Arthropoda
- Clade: Pancrustacea
- Class: Insecta
- Order: Lepidoptera
- Family: Depressariidae
- Genus: Antaeotricha
- Species: A. aerinotata

Binomial name
- Antaeotricha aerinotata (Butler, 1877)

Synonyms
- Cryptolechia aerinotata Butler, 1877; Stenoma speratum Busck, 1911

Species of moth in genus Antaeotricha

Antaeotricha aerinotata is a moth species in the family Depressariidae. It was described by Arthur Gardiner Butler in 1877. It is found in Amazonas, Brazil.

The wingspan is about 24 mm. The forewings are greyish-brown, the external half of the cell, the area beyond it, and a transverse patch placed at right angles to it and parallel to the inferior extremity of the outer margin, pale brassy-green. There is also a blackish dot at the end of cell. The hindwings are shining brown.
