= Antaeotricha umbriferella =

Scientific classification
- Kingdom: Animalia
- Phylum: Arthropoda
- Class: Insecta
- Order: Lepidoptera
- Family: Depressariidae
- Genus: Antaeotricha
- Species: A. umbriferella

Binomial name
- Antaeotricha umbriferella (Walker, 1864)

Synonyms
- Cryptolechia umbriferella Walker, 1864

Species of moth

Antaeotricha umbriferella is a moth in the family Depressariidae. It was described by Francis Walker in 1864. It is found in Amazonas, Brazil.

Adults are hoary, the forewings clouded with brownish cinereous (ash gray) along the interior border and with a dislocated abbreviated brown line along the middle of the disk. There are three oblique brown streaks extending from the costa to the disk, the first and second joining the line, the third forming an angle beyond the line and retracted to the interior border. There is a row of black points very near the exterior border, which is very convex. The hindwings are brownish cinereous moderately broad.
