= Antaeotricha basirubrella =

Scientific classification
- Kingdom: Animalia
- Phylum: Arthropoda
- Clade: Pancrustacea
- Class: Insecta
- Order: Lepidoptera
- Family: Depressariidae
- Genus: Antaeotricha
- Species: A. basirubrella

Binomial name
- Antaeotricha basirubrella (Walker, 1864)

Synonyms
- Cryptolechia basirubrella Walker, 1864

Species of moth in genus Antaeotricha

Antaeotricha basirubrella is a moth in the family Depressariidae. It was described by Francis Walker in 1864. It is found in Amazonas, Brazil.

Adults are brown, the forewings reddish ferruginous for one-third of the length from the base, this hue bounded by an angular transverse whitish line. There is a slightly curved transverse submarginal whitish line, the space between the two lines irregularly whitish speckled. The marginal points are whitish and diffuse.
