= Antaeotricha semisignella =

Scientific classification
- Kingdom: Animalia
- Phylum: Arthropoda
- Class: Insecta
- Order: Lepidoptera
- Family: Depressariidae
- Genus: Antaeotricha
- Species: A. semisignella

Binomial name
- Antaeotricha semisignella (Walker, 1864)

Synonyms
- Cryptolechia semisignella Walker, 1864; Cryptolechia consociella Walker, 1864 (preocc.); Cryptolechia batesella Walker, 1866; Stenoma consonella Busck, 1935

Species of moth

Antaeotricha semisignella is a moth in the family Depressariidae. It was described by Francis Walker in 1864. It is found in Amazonas, Brazil.

Adults are whitish, the forewings with two brownish dots in the disk, one before the middle, the other at two-thirds of the length. The hindwings are brownish.
