= Antaeotricha tripustulella =

Scientific classification
- Kingdom: Animalia
- Phylum: Arthropoda
- Class: Insecta
- Order: Lepidoptera
- Family: Depressariidae
- Genus: Antaeotricha
- Species: A. tripustulella

Binomial name
- Antaeotricha tripustulella (Walker, 1864)

Synonyms
- Cryptolechia tripustulella Walker, 1864

Species of moth

Antaeotricha tripustulella is a moth in the family Depressariidae. It was described by Francis Walker in 1864. It is found in Amazonas, Brazil.

Adults are white, the forewings are pale brownish towards the exterior border, with the exception of the minutely denticulated whitish submarginal and marginal lines. There are three elongated blackish patches, the first and second on the costa and the third on the interior border, between the first and the second. The hindwings are brownish.
