= Antaeotricha aratella =

Scientific classification
- Kingdom: Animalia
- Phylum: Arthropoda
- Clade: Pancrustacea
- Class: Insecta
- Order: Lepidoptera
- Family: Depressariidae
- Genus: Antaeotricha
- Species: A. aratella

Binomial name
- Antaeotricha aratella (Walker, 1864)

Synonyms
- Cryptolechia aratella Walker, 1864

Species of moth in genus Antaeotricha

Antaeotricha aratella is a moth in the family Depressariidae. It was described by Francis Walker in 1864. It is found in Amazonas, Brazil.

Adults are wood colour, the forewings whitish in front, brownish hindward, with some irregular blackish streaks and with a blackish patch on the middle of the interior border.
