= Antaeotricha albitincta =

Scientific classification
- Kingdom: Animalia
- Phylum: Arthropoda
- Clade: Pancrustacea
- Class: Insecta
- Order: Lepidoptera
- Family: Depressariidae
- Genus: Antaeotricha
- Species: A. albitincta

Binomial name
- Antaeotricha albitincta (Meyrick, 1930)

Synonyms
- Stenoma albitincta Meyrick, 1930; Stenoma pauroconis Meyrick, 1932

Species of moth in genus Antaeotricha

Antaeotricha albitincta is a moth in the family Depressariidae. It can be identified by its white wings with dark edges, typically being brown or black. It was described by Edward Meyrick in 1930. It is found in Brazil.
