= Antaeotricha ogmolopha =

Scientific classification
- Domain: Eukaryota
- Kingdom: Animalia
- Phylum: Arthropoda
- Class: Insecta
- Order: Lepidoptera
- Family: Depressariidae
- Genus: Antaeotricha
- Species: A. ogmolopha

Binomial name
- Antaeotricha ogmolopha (Meyrick, 1930)

Synonyms
- Stenoma ogmolopha Meyrick, 1930

Species of moth

Antaeotricha ogmolopha is a moth in the family Depressariidae. It was described by Edward Meyrick in 1930. It is found in Brazil (Para).

The wingspan is about 13 mm.
