= Antaeotricha nitidorella =

Scientific classification
- Kingdom: Animalia
- Phylum: Arthropoda
- Class: Insecta
- Order: Lepidoptera
- Family: Depressariidae
- Genus: Antaeotricha
- Species: A. nitidorella

Binomial name
- Antaeotricha nitidorella (Walker, 1864)

Synonyms
- Cryptolechia nitidorella Walker, 1864

Species of moth

Antaeotricha nitidorella is a moth in the family Depressariidae. It was described by Francis Walker in 1864. It is found in Amazonas, Brazil.

Adults are brownish silvery white, the hindwings semihyaline (almost glassy).
