= Antaeotricha semicinerea =

Scientific classification
- Kingdom: Animalia
- Phylum: Arthropoda
- Clade: Pancrustacea
- Class: Insecta
- Order: Lepidoptera
- Family: Depressariidae
- Genus: Antaeotricha
- Species: A. semicinerea

Binomial name
- Antaeotricha semicinerea Zeller, 1877

Synonyms
- Antaeotricha hemitephras Meyrick, 1930

Species of moth

Antaeotricha semicinerea is a moth in the family Depressariidae. It was described by Philipp Christoph Zeller in 1877. It is found in Panama, Guatemala and Brazil (Amazonas).
