= Antaeotricha bracatingae =

Scientific classification
- Kingdom: Animalia
- Phylum: Arthropoda
- Clade: Pancrustacea
- Class: Insecta
- Order: Lepidoptera
- Family: Depressariidae
- Genus: Antaeotricha
- Species: A. bracatingae

Binomial name
- Antaeotricha bracatingae (Köhler, 1943)

Synonyms
- Stenoma bracatingae Köhler, 1943

Species of moth in genus Antaeotricha

Antaeotricha bracatingae is a moth in the family Depressariidae. It was described by Paul Köhler in 1943. It is found in Rio Grande do Sul, Brazil.
