= Scopula rubrocinctata =

Scientific classification
- Kingdom: Animalia
- Phylum: Arthropoda
- Class: Insecta
- Order: Lepidoptera
- Family: Geometridae
- Genus: Scopula
- Species: S. rubrocinctata

Binomial name
- Scopula rubrocinctata (Guenée, [1858])

Synonyms
- Acidalia rubrocinctata Guenée, 1858; Haemalea rufifimbria Warren, 1905

Species of geometer moth in subfamily Sterrhinae

Scopula rubrocinctata is a moth of the family Geometridae. It is found in Brazil and Peru.
