= Antaeotricha unisecta =

Scientific classification
- Domain: Eukaryota
- Kingdom: Animalia
- Phylum: Arthropoda
- Class: Insecta
- Order: Lepidoptera
- Family: Depressariidae
- Genus: Antaeotricha
- Species: A. unisecta

Binomial name
- Antaeotricha unisecta (Meyrick, 1930)

Synonyms
- Stenoma unisecta Meyrick, 1930

Species of moth

Antaeotricha unisecta is a moth in the family Depressariidae. It was described by Edward Meyrick in 1930. It is found in Brazil.
