= Scopula conotaria =

Scientific classification
- Domain: Eukaryota
- Kingdom: Animalia
- Phylum: Arthropoda
- Class: Insecta
- Order: Lepidoptera
- Family: Geometridae
- Genus: Scopula
- Species: S. conotaria

Binomial name
- Scopula conotaria (Schaus, 1901)

Synonyms
- Craspedia conotaria Schaus, 1901

Species of geometer moth in subfamily Sterrhinae

Scopula conotaria is a moth of the family Geometridae. It was described by Schaus in 1901. It is found in south-eastern Brazil.
