= Antaeotricha amphizyga =

Scientific classification
- Kingdom: Animalia
- Phylum: Arthropoda
- Clade: Pancrustacea
- Class: Insecta
- Order: Lepidoptera
- Family: Depressariidae
- Genus: Antaeotricha
- Species: A. amphizyga

Binomial name
- Antaeotricha amphizyga Meyrick, 1930

Species of moth in genus Antaeotricha

Antaeotricha amphizyga is a moth in the family Depressariidae. It was described by Edward Meyrick in 1930. It is found in Brazil (Para).
