= Scopula unicornata =

Scientific classification
- Domain: Eukaryota
- Kingdom: Animalia
- Phylum: Arthropoda
- Class: Insecta
- Order: Lepidoptera
- Family: Geometridae
- Genus: Scopula
- Species: S. unicornata

Binomial name
- Scopula unicornata (Warren, 1900)

Synonyms
- Craspedia unicornata Warren, 1900

Species of geometer moth in subfamily Sterrhinae

Scopula unicornata is a moth of the family Geometridae. It is found in Brazil.
