= Scopula timboensis =

Scientific classification
- Kingdom: Animalia
- Phylum: Arthropoda
- Clade: Pancrustacea
- Class: Insecta
- Order: Lepidoptera
- Family: Geometridae
- Genus: Scopula
- Species: S. timboensis

Binomial name
- Scopula timboensis Prout, 1938

Species of geometer moth in subfamily Sterrhinae

Scopula timboensis is a moth of the family Geometridae. It is found in Brazil.
