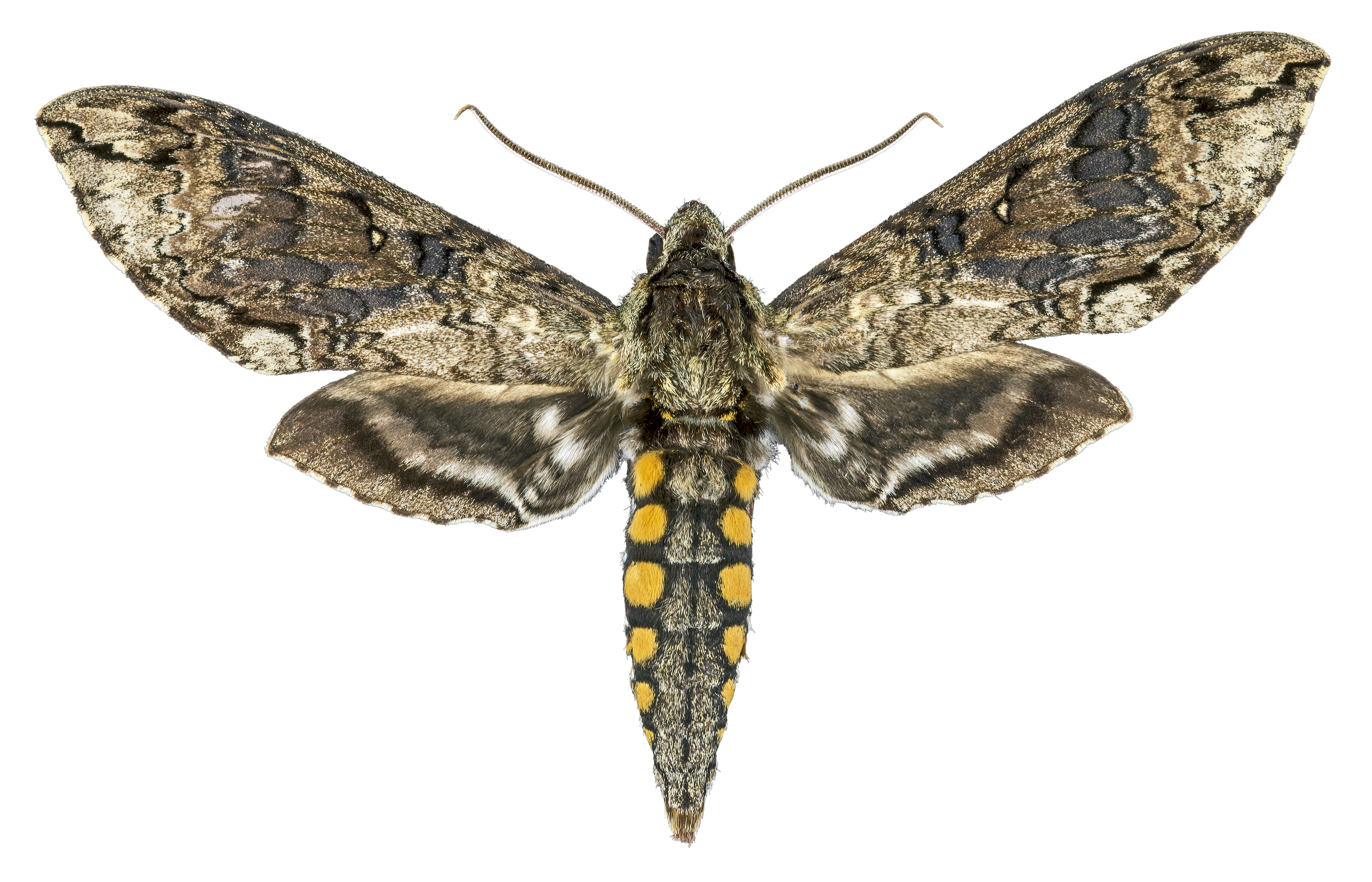
- Manduca brasiliensis

Scientific classification
- Kingdom: Animalia
- Phylum: Arthropoda
- Clade: Pancrustacea
- Class: Insecta
- Order: Lepidoptera
- Family: Sphingidae
- Tribe: Sphingini
- Genus: Manduca; Hübner, 1807

Species
- About 70, see text

Synonyms
- Syzygia Grote & Robinson, 1865; Protoparce Burmeister, 1855; Phlegethontius Hübner, 1819; Macrosila Walker, 1856; Diludia Grote & Robinson, 1865; Chlaenogramma Smith, 1887

= Manduca =

Genus of moths

Manduca is a genus of moths in the family Sphingidae, the hawkmoths. The genus is used as a model in the biological sciences. The tobacco hornworm (Manduca sexta) and the tomato hornworm (M. quinquemaculata) in particular have been well studied. The genus was erected by Jacob Hübner in 1807.

== Species ==
- Manduca afflicta
- Manduca albiplaga - white-plaqued sphinx
- Manduca albolineata
- Manduca andicola
- Manduca armatipes
- Manduca aztecus
- Manduca barnesi
- Manduca bergarmatipes
- Manduca bergi
- Manduca blackburni - Blackburn's sphinx
- Manduca boliviana
- Manduca brasiliensis
- Manduca brontes
- Manduca brunalba
- Manduca camposi
- Manduca caribbeus
- Manduca chinchilla
- Manduca clarki
- Manduca contracta
- Manduca corallina
- Manduca corumbensis
- Manduca dalica
- Manduca diffissa
- Manduca dilucida
- Manduca duquefi
- Manduca empusa
- Manduca extrema
- Manduca feronia
- Manduca florestan
- Manduca fosteri
- Manduca franciscae
- Manduca gloriosa
- Manduca gueneei
- Manduca hannibal
- Manduca huascara
- Manduca incisa
- Manduca janira
- Manduca jasminearum - ash sphinx
- Manduca johanni
- Manduca jordani
- Manduca kuschei
- Manduca lamasi
- Manduca lanuginosa
- Manduca lefeburii
- Manduca leucospila
- Manduca lichenea
- Manduca lucetius
- Manduca manducoides
- Manduca morelia
- Manduca mossi
- Manduca muscosa - muscosa sphinx
- Manduca neglecta
- Manduca occulta - occult sphinx
- Manduca ochus
- Manduca pellenia
- Manduca prestoni
- Manduca quinquemaculata - five-spotted hawkmoth, tomato hornworm
- Manduca reducta
- Manduca rustica - rustic sphinx
- Manduca schausi
- Manduca scutata
- Manduca sesquiplex
- Manduca sexta - Carolina sphinx, six-spotted hawkmoth, tobacco hornworm
- Manduca stuarti
- Manduca trimacula
- Manduca tucumana
- Manduca undata
- Manduca vestalis
- Manduca violaalba
- Manduca wellingi
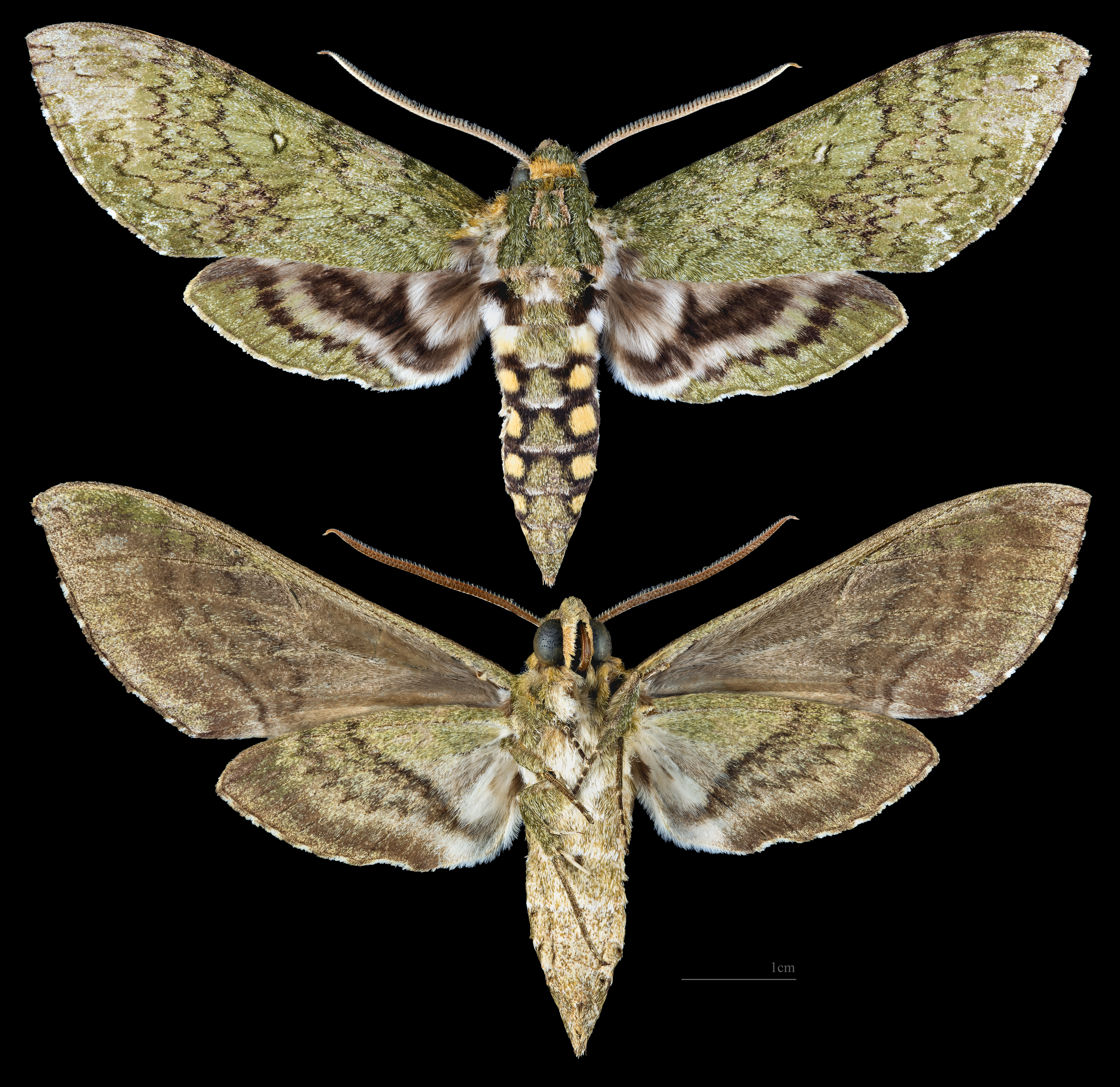
Manduca afflicta

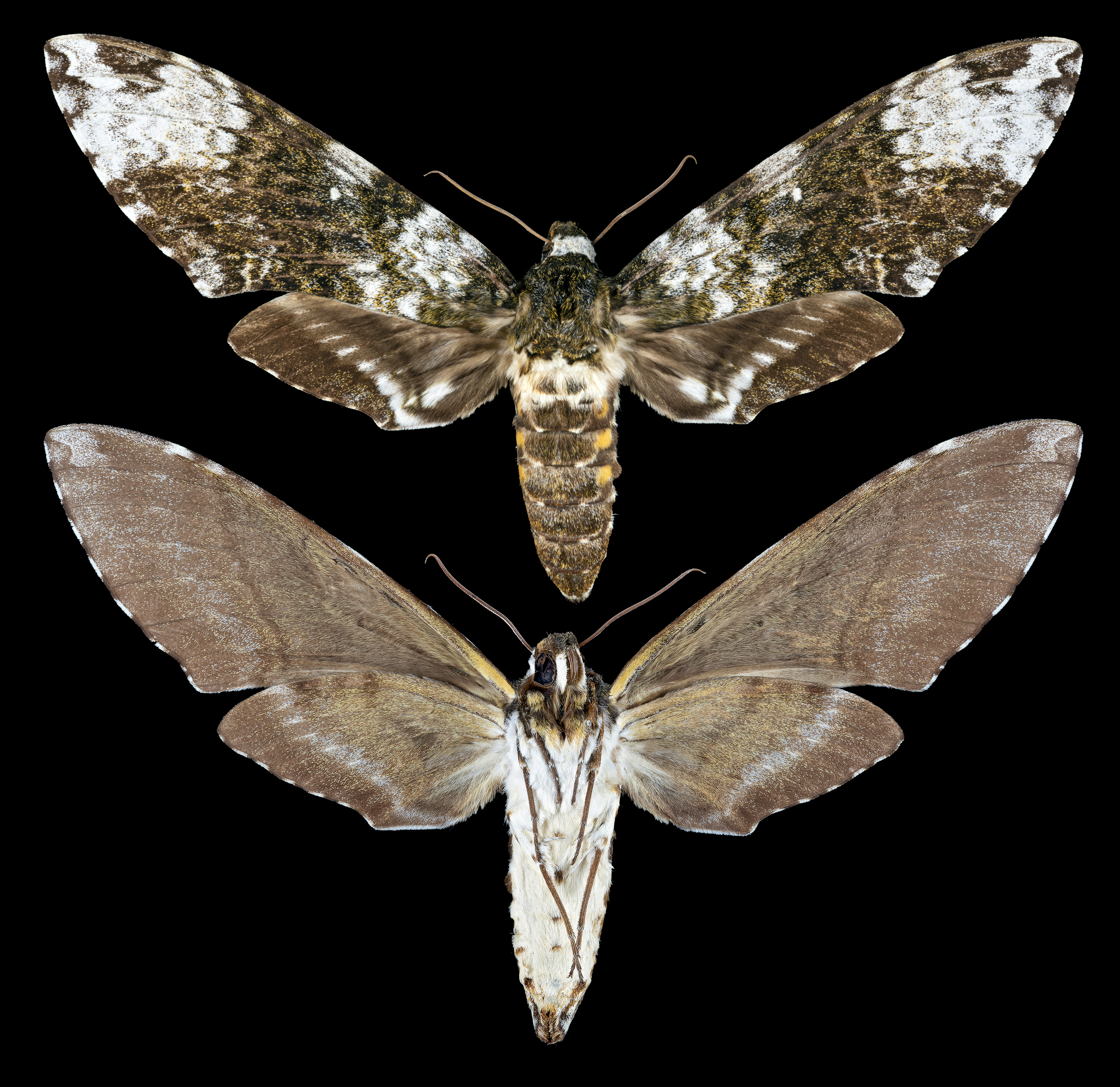
Manduca albiplaga

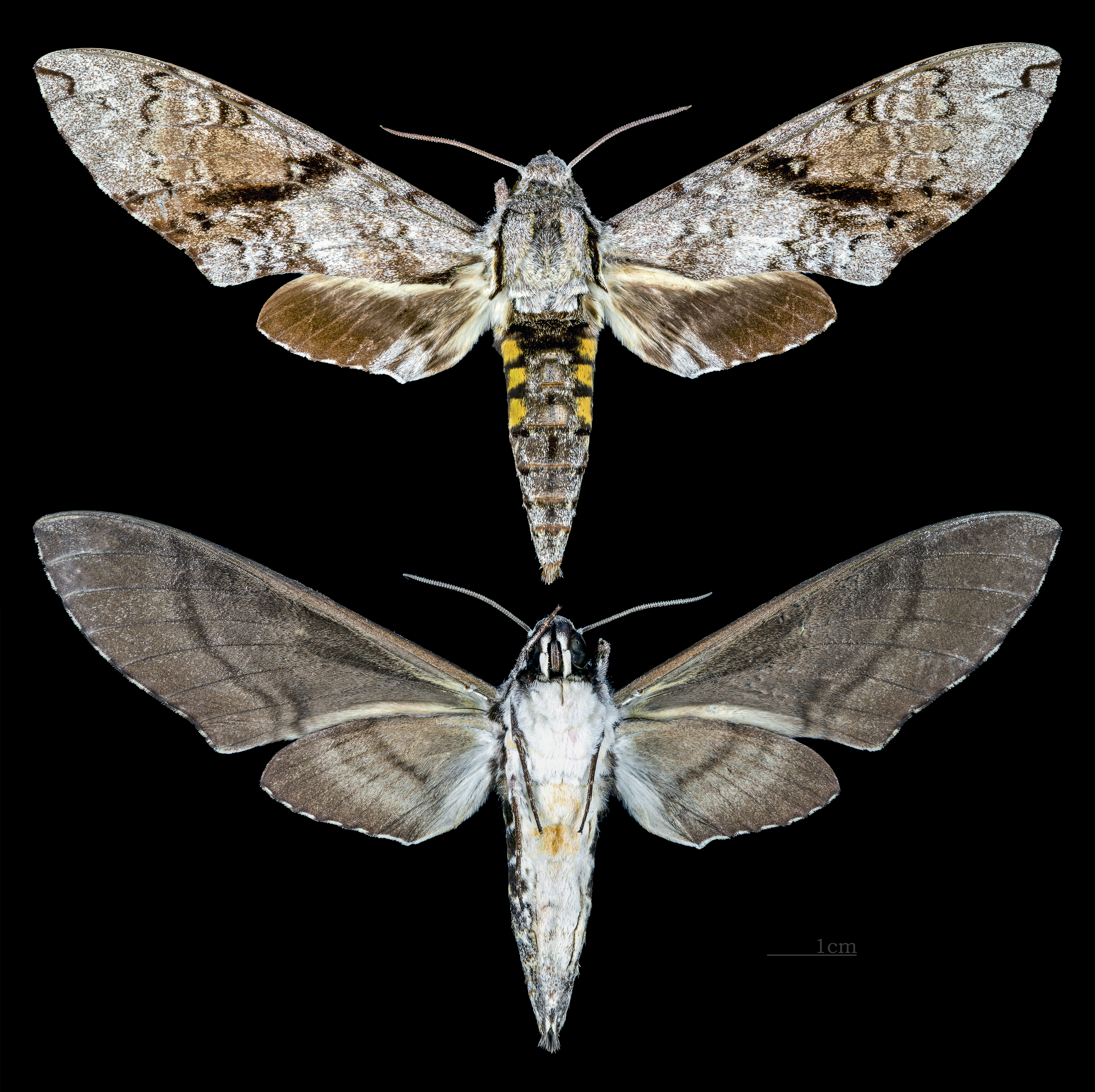
Manduca andicola

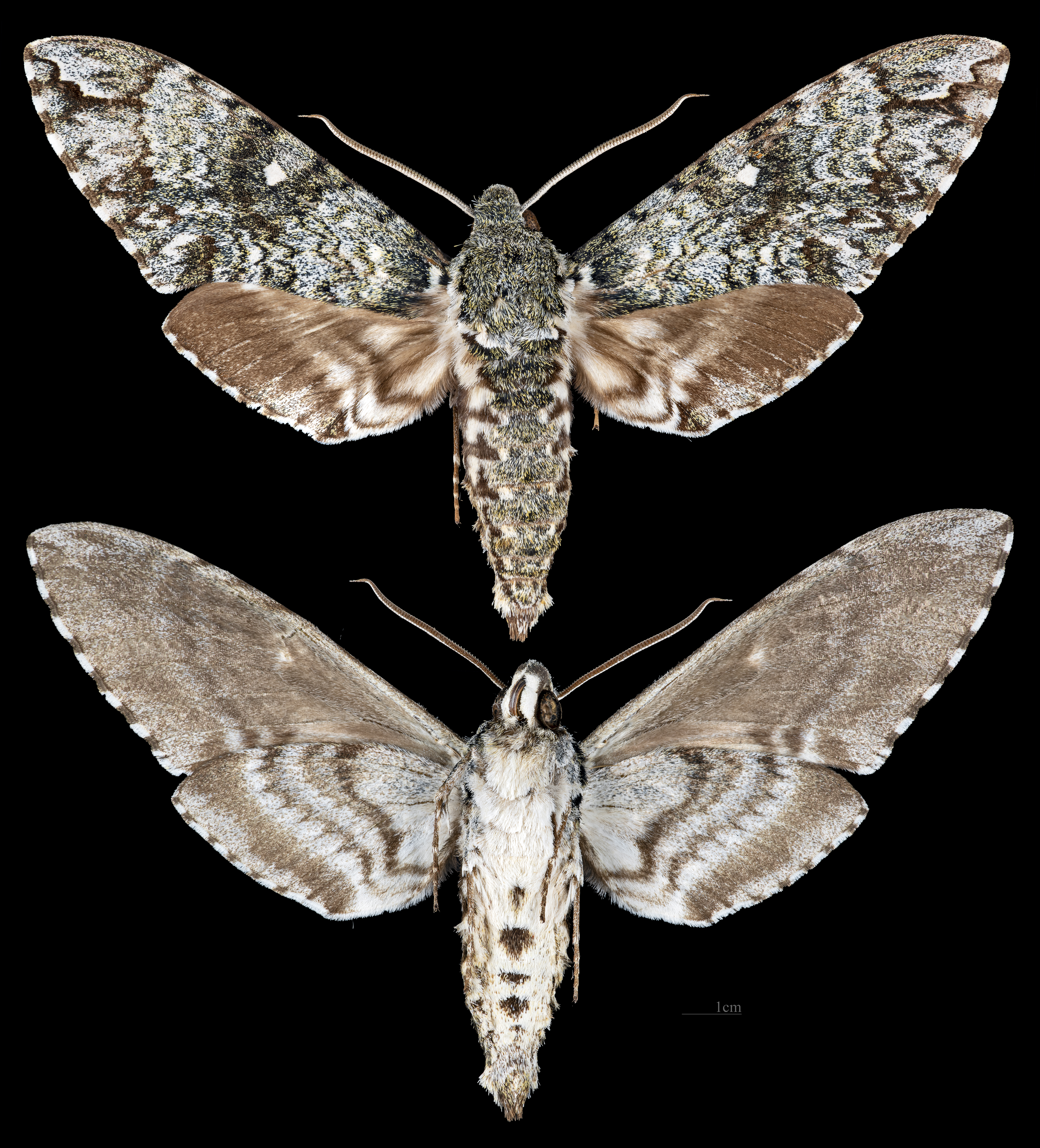
Manduca armatipes

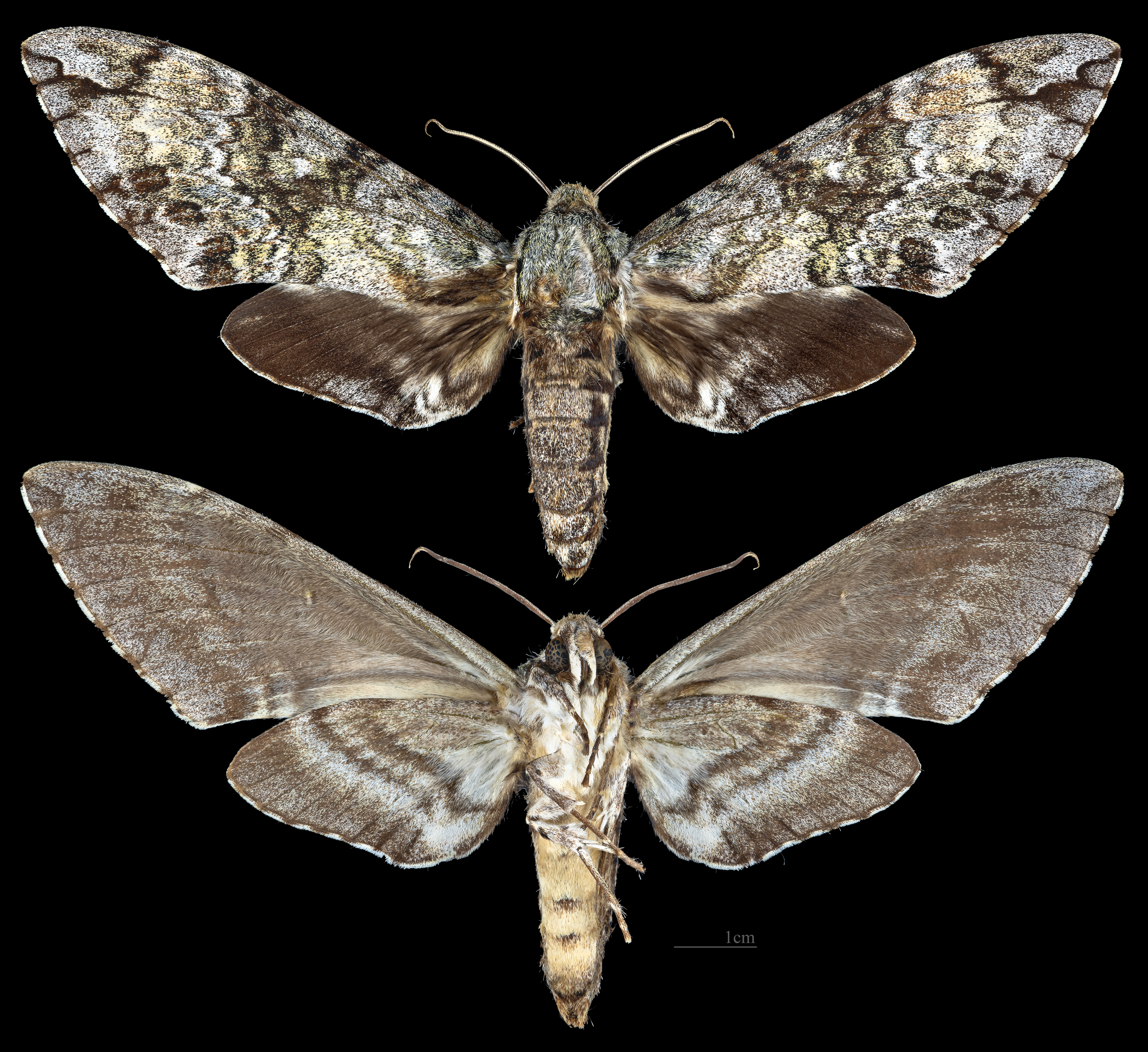
Manduca barnesi

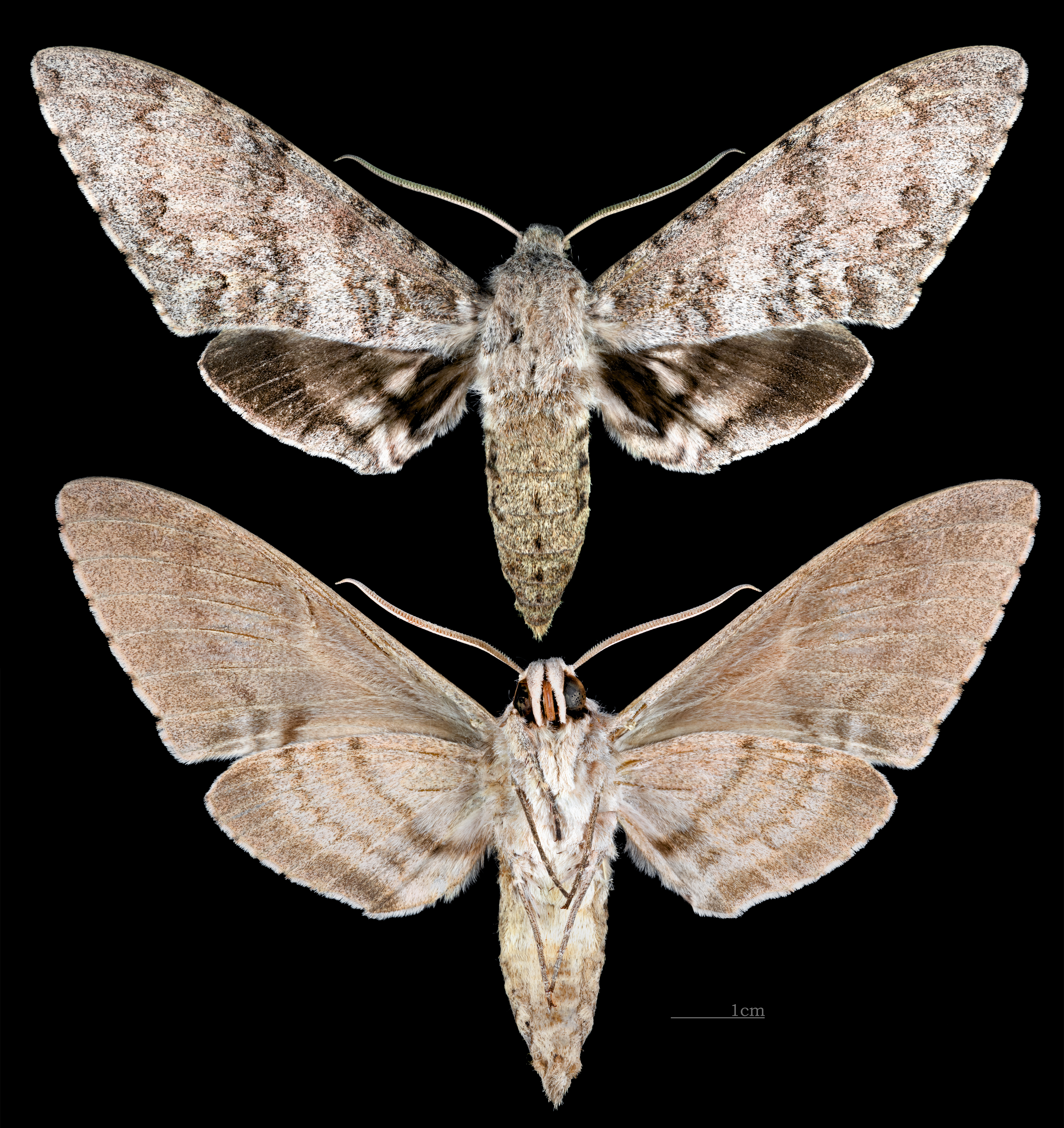
Manduca bergi

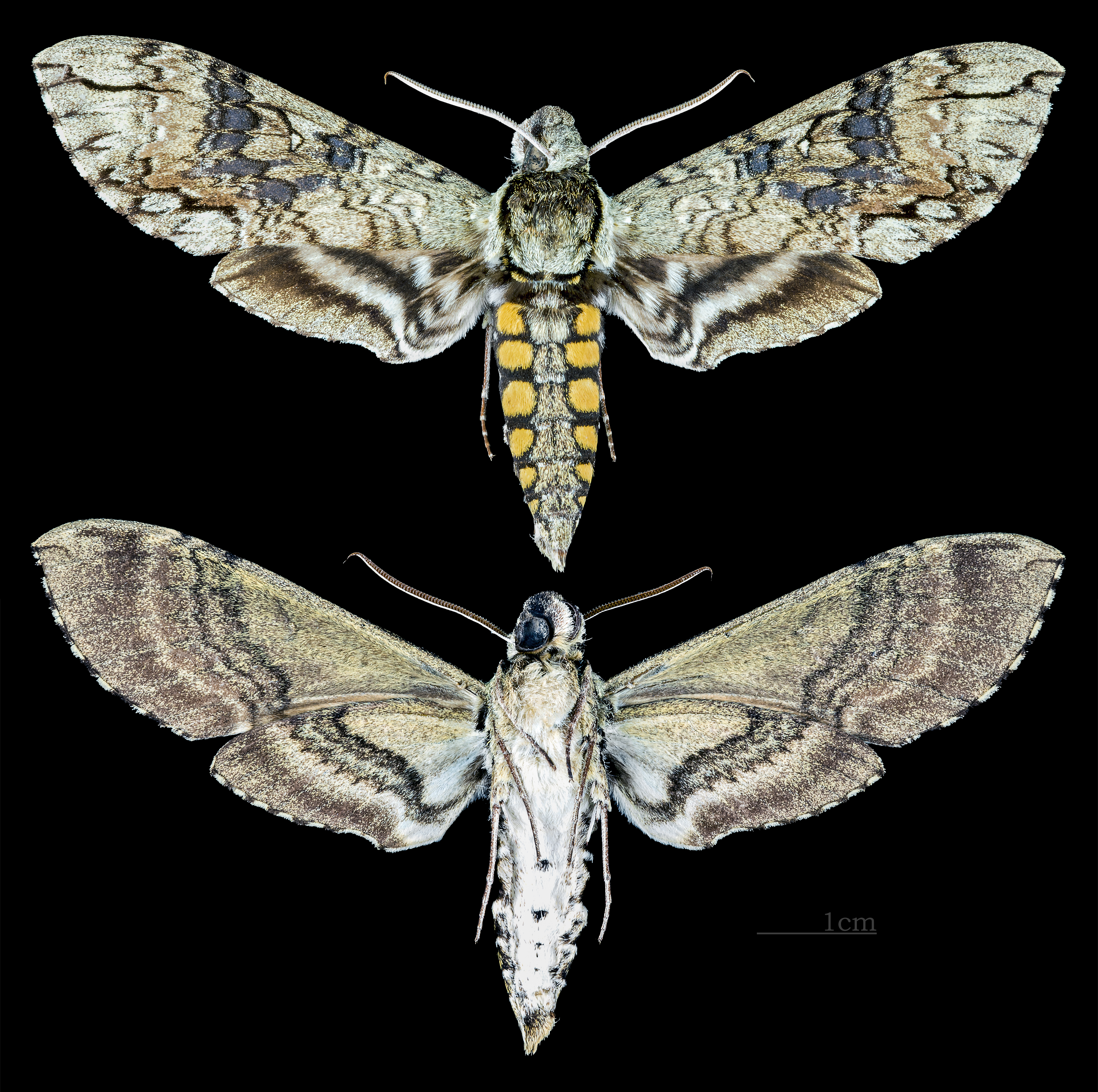
Manduca boliviana

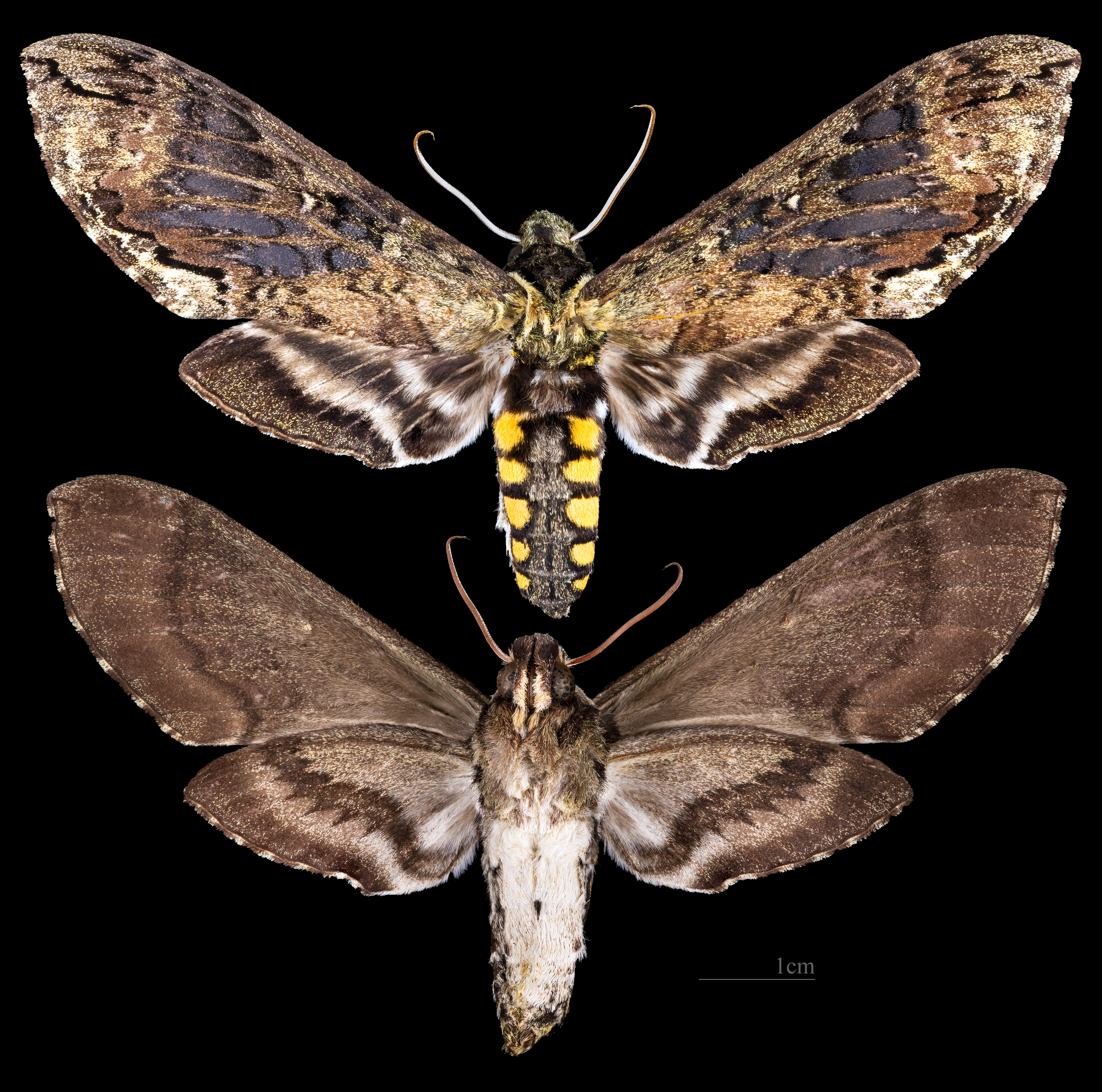
Manduca brasiliensis

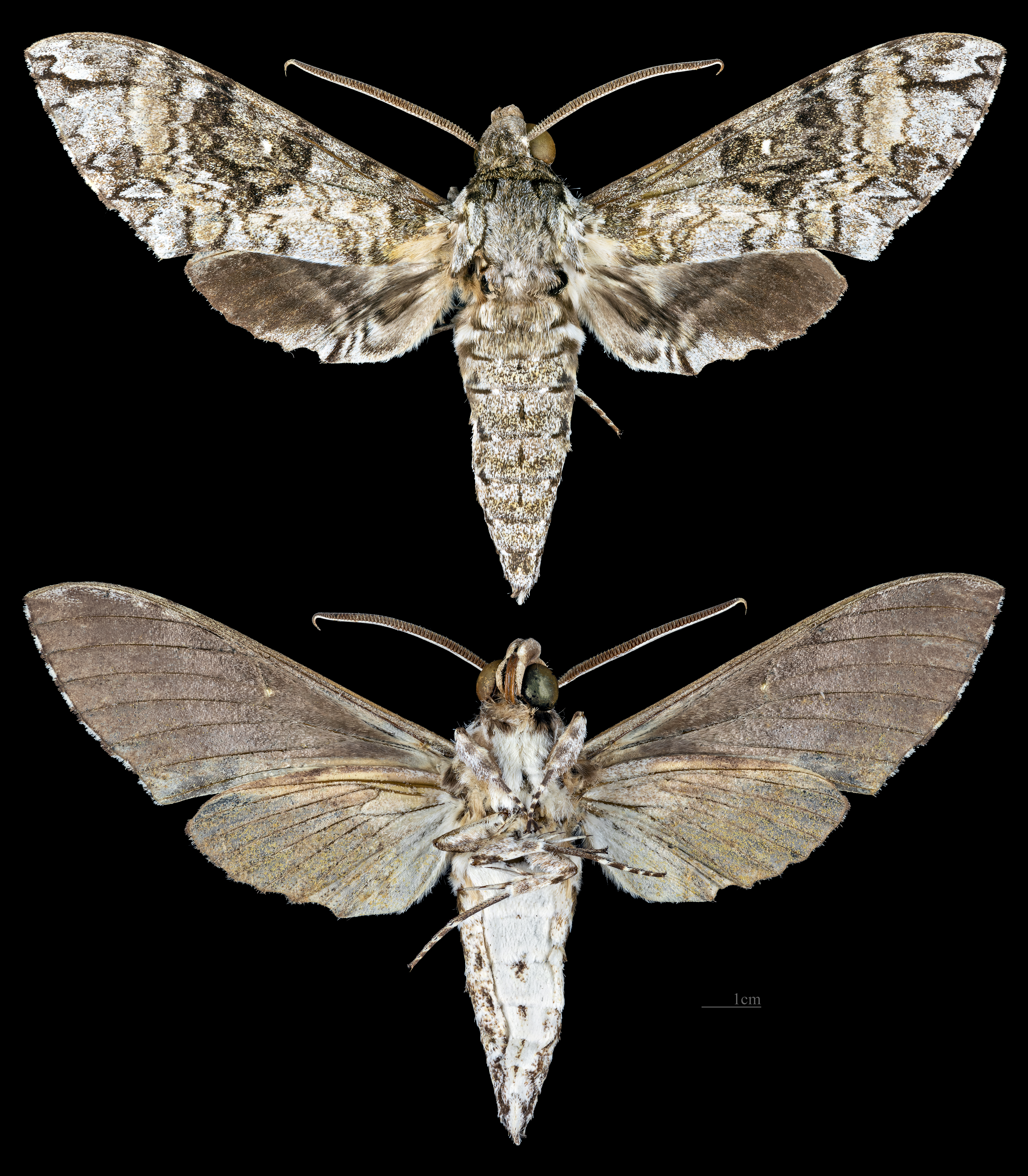
Manduca brontes

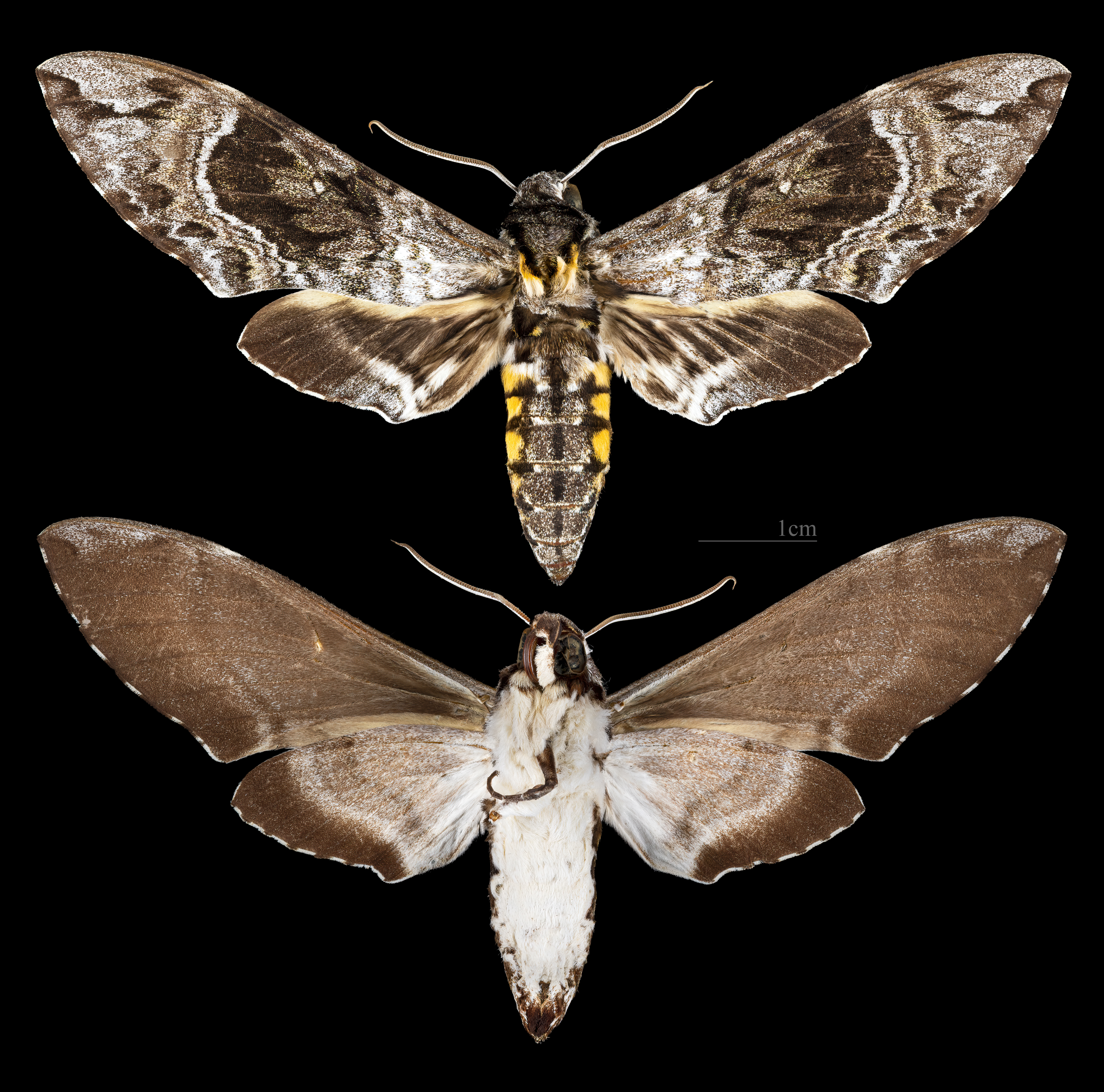
Manduca brunalba

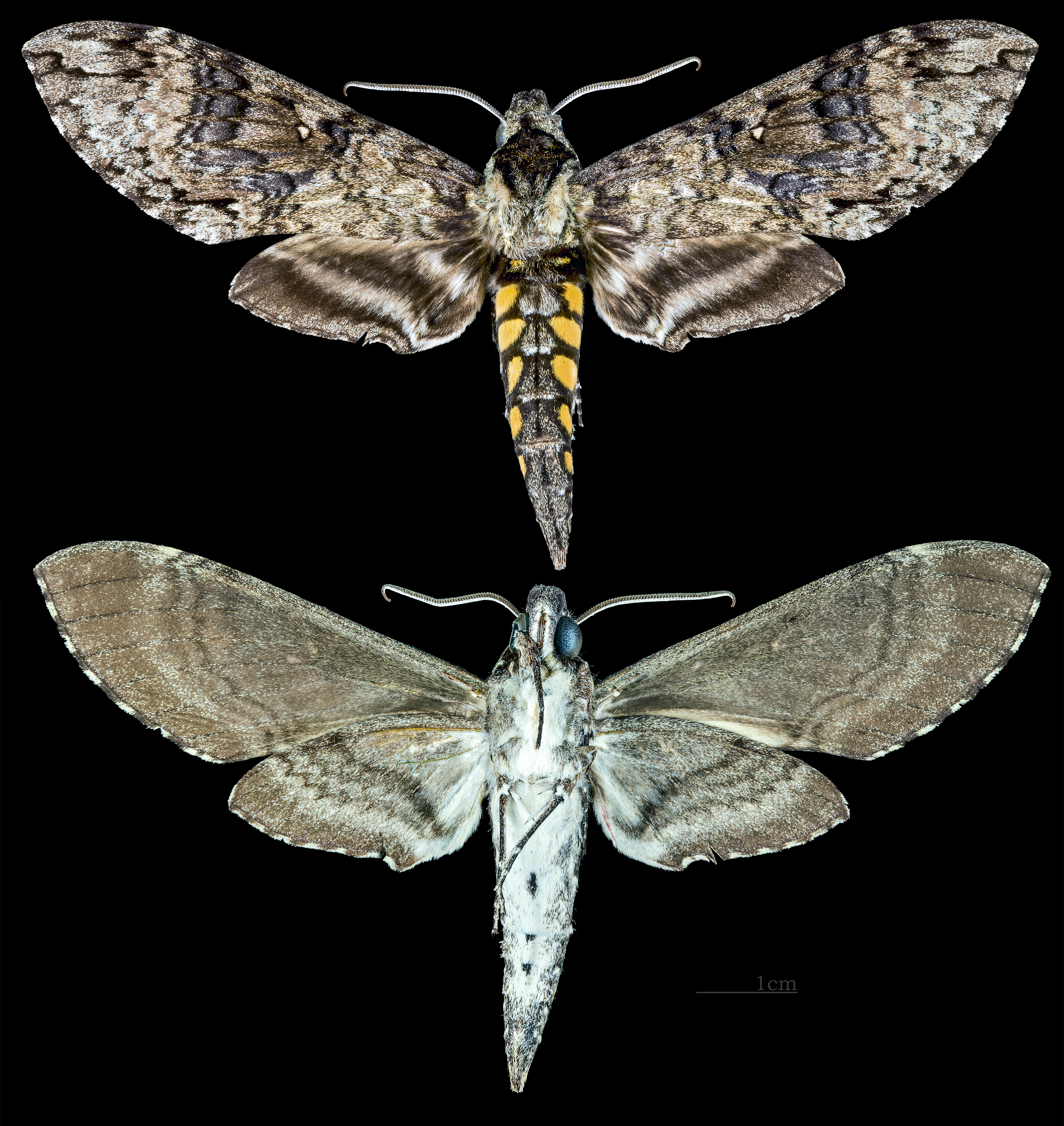
Manduca clarki

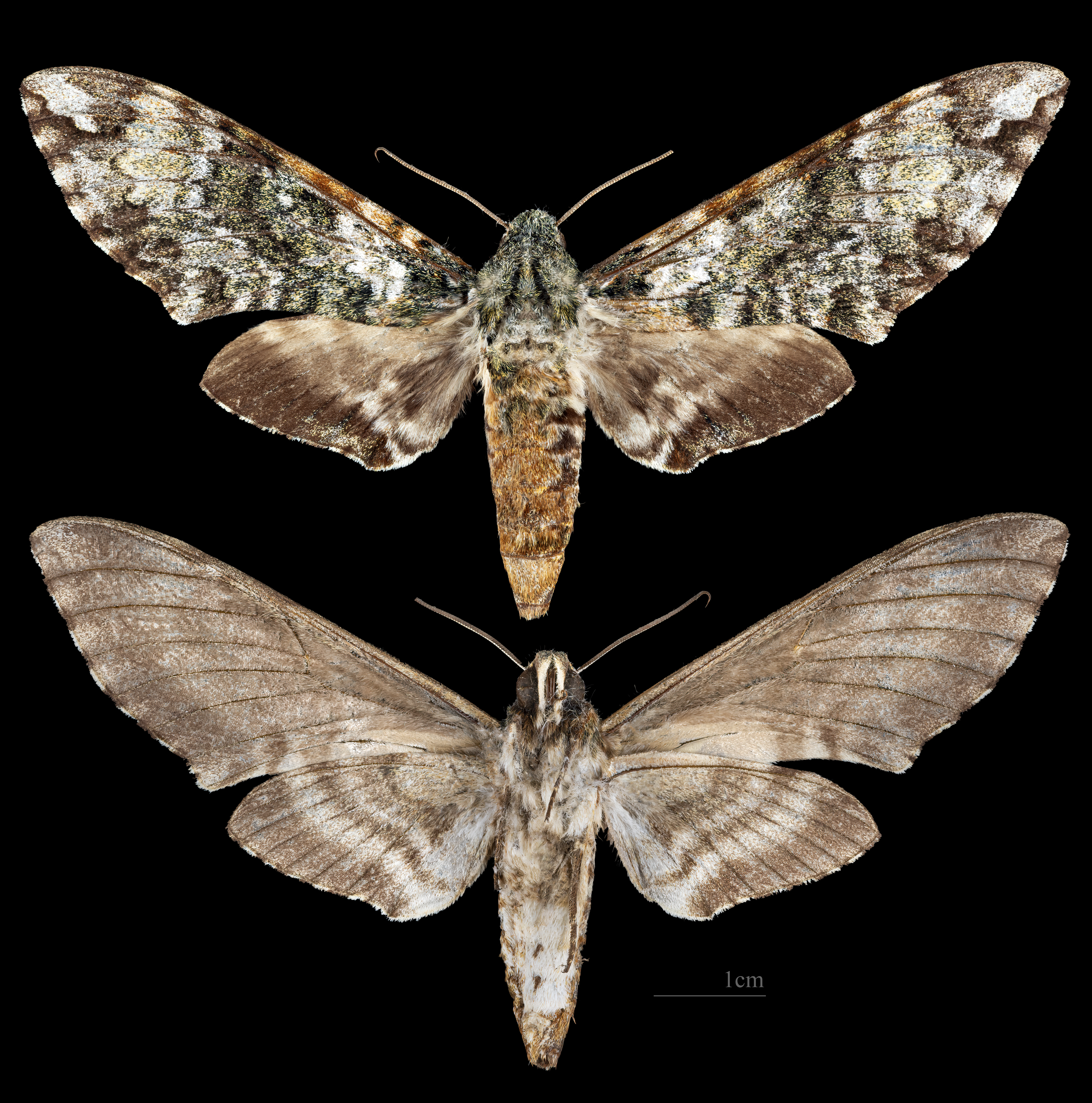
Manduca corallina

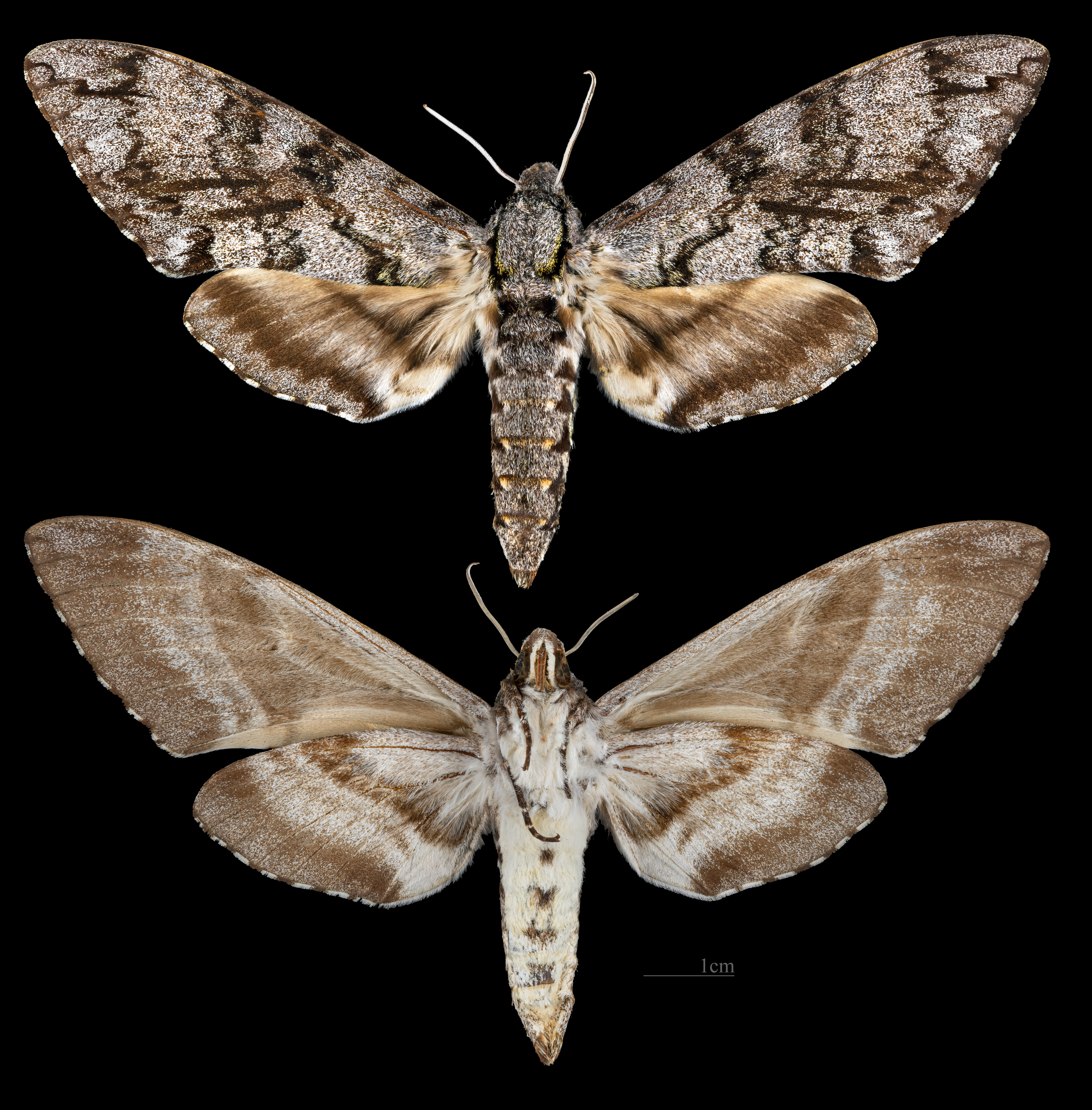
Manduca corumbensis

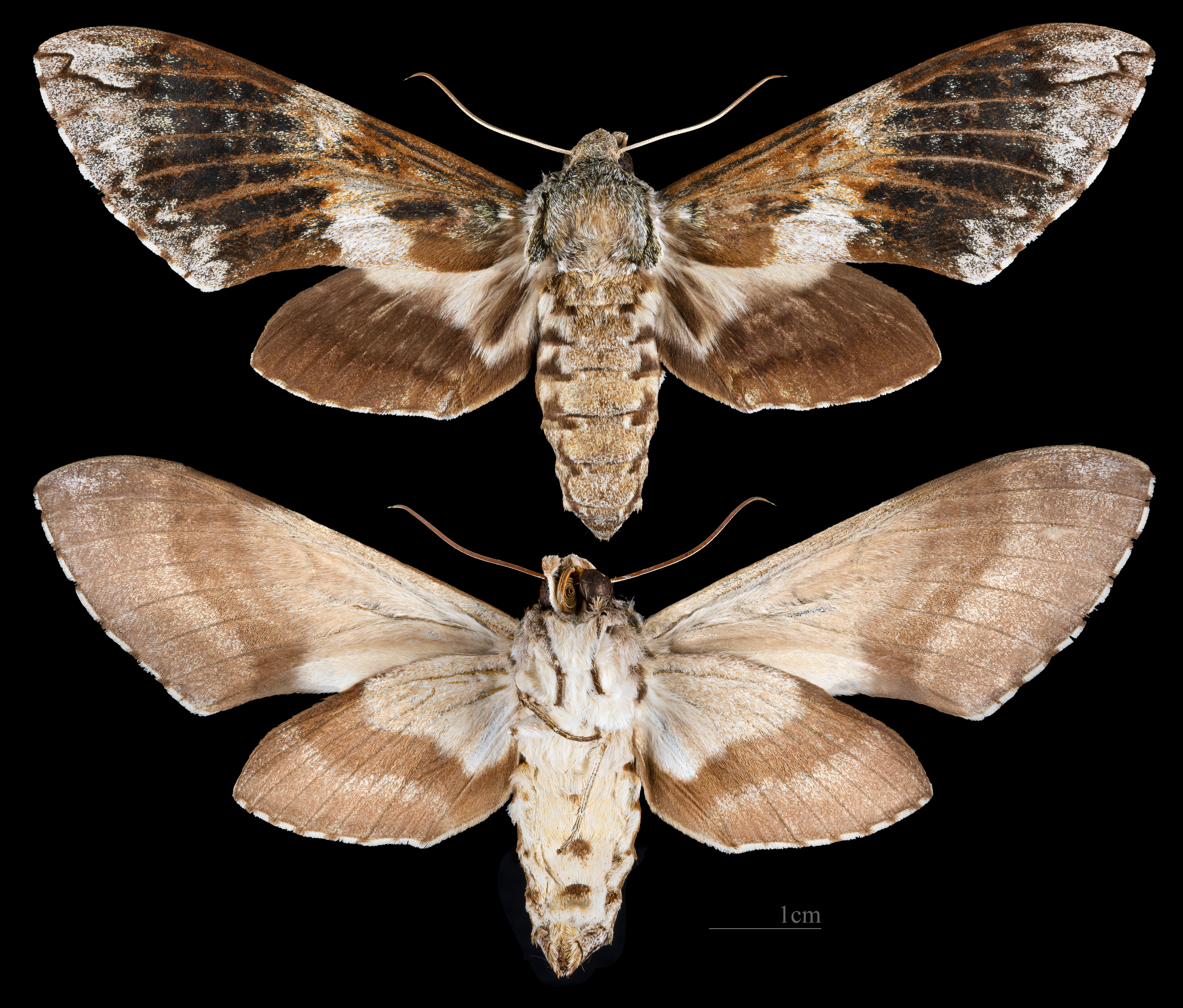
Manduca crocala

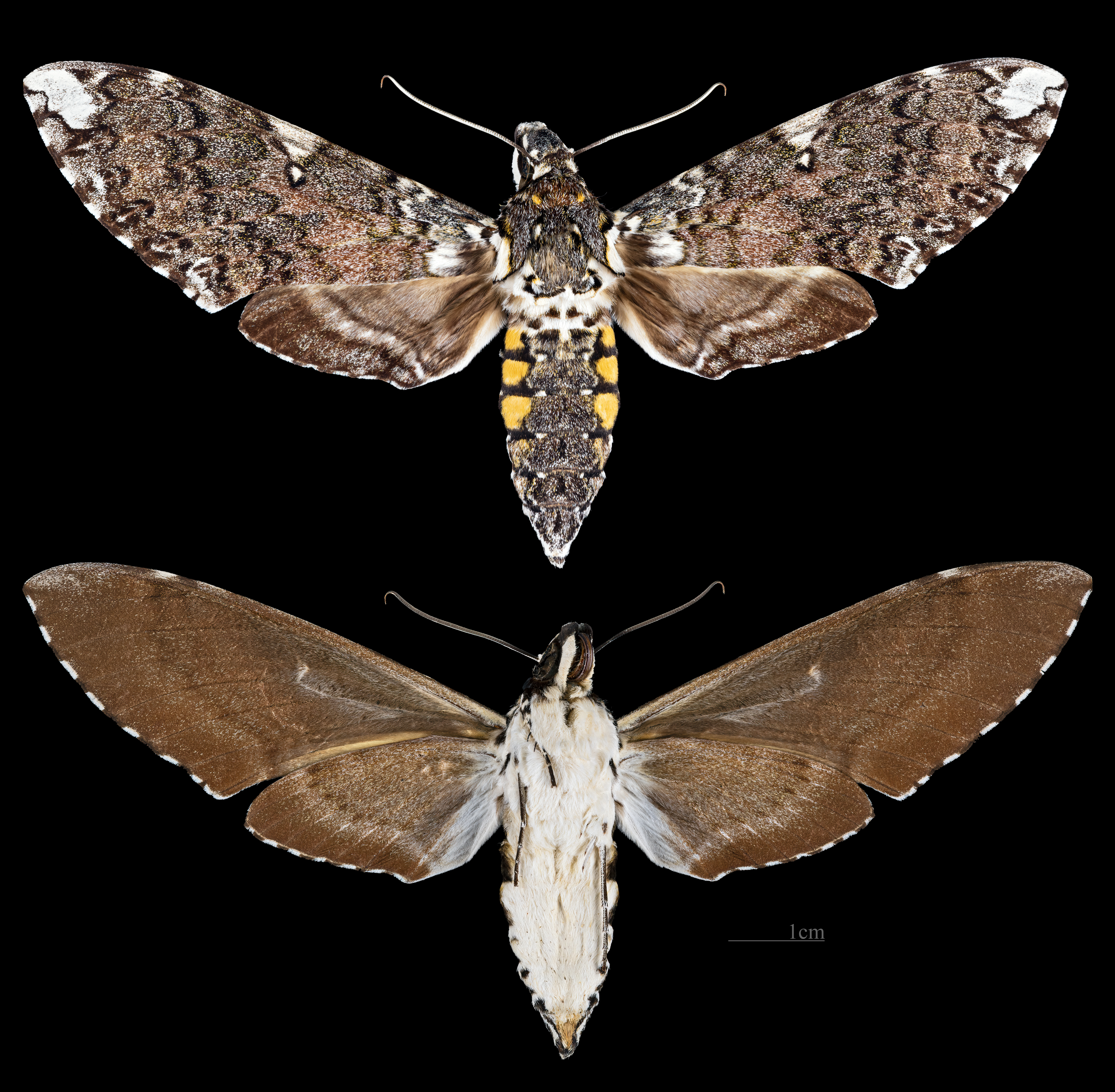
Manduca dalica

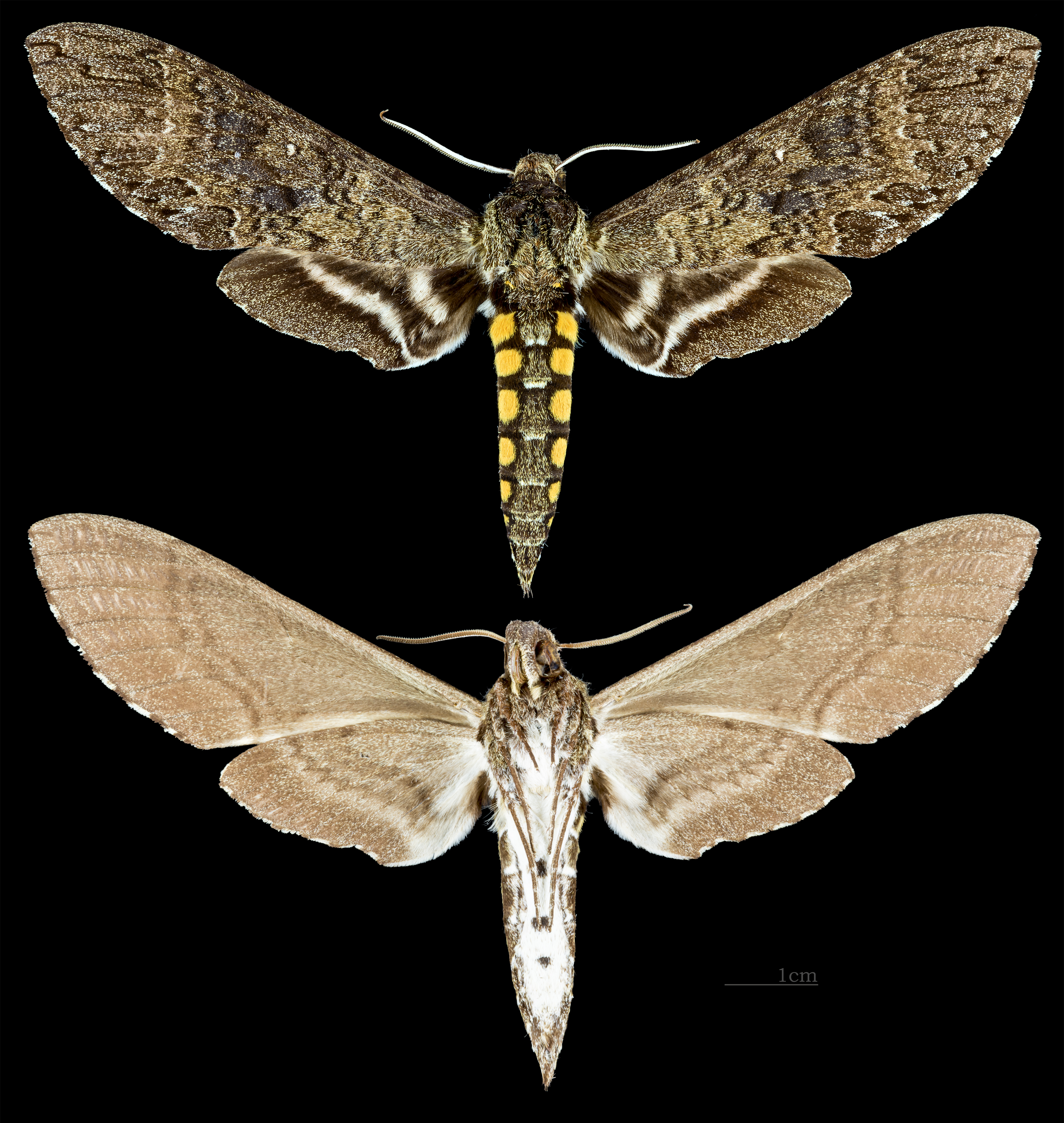
Manduca diffissa

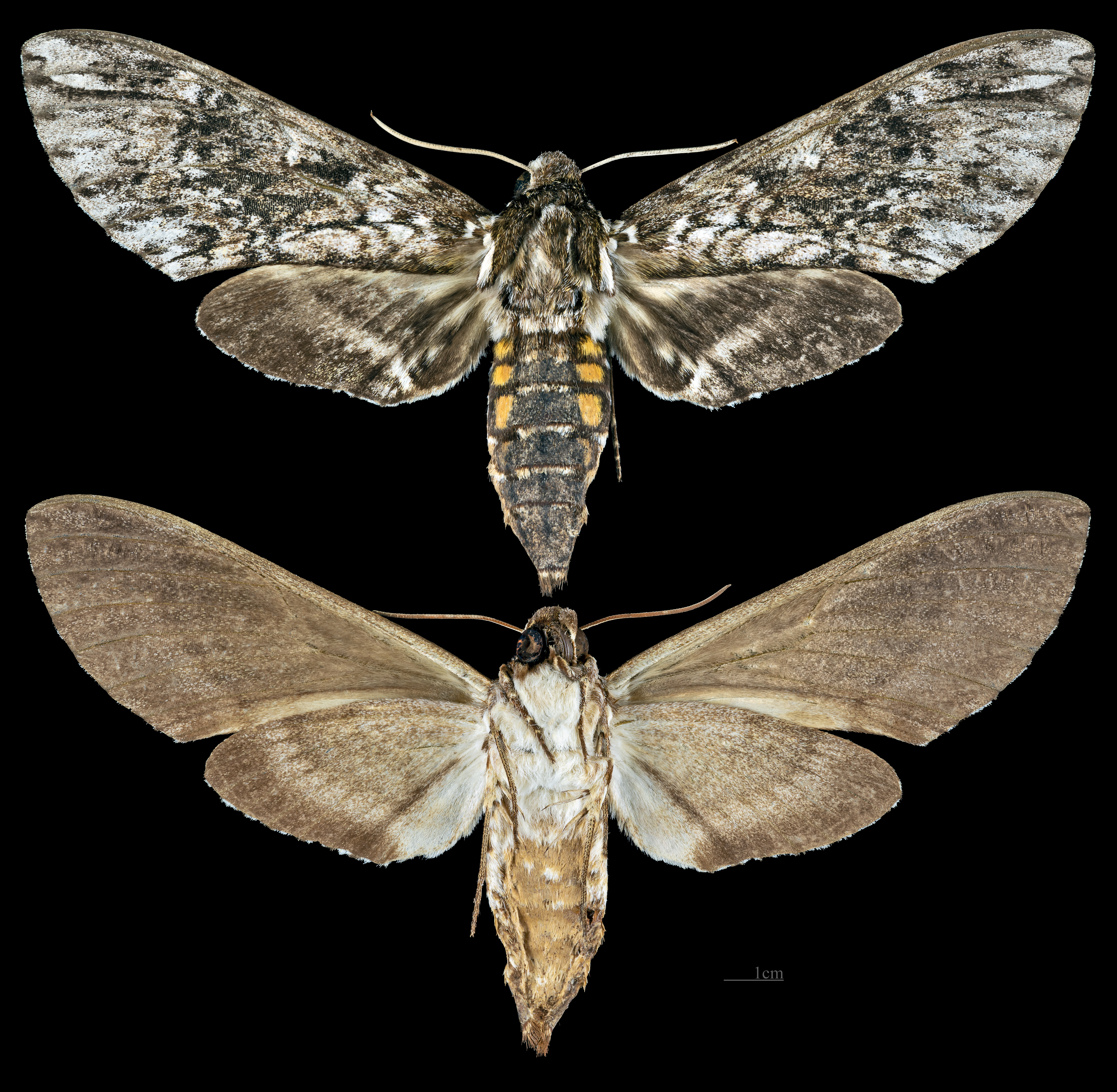
Manduca dilucida

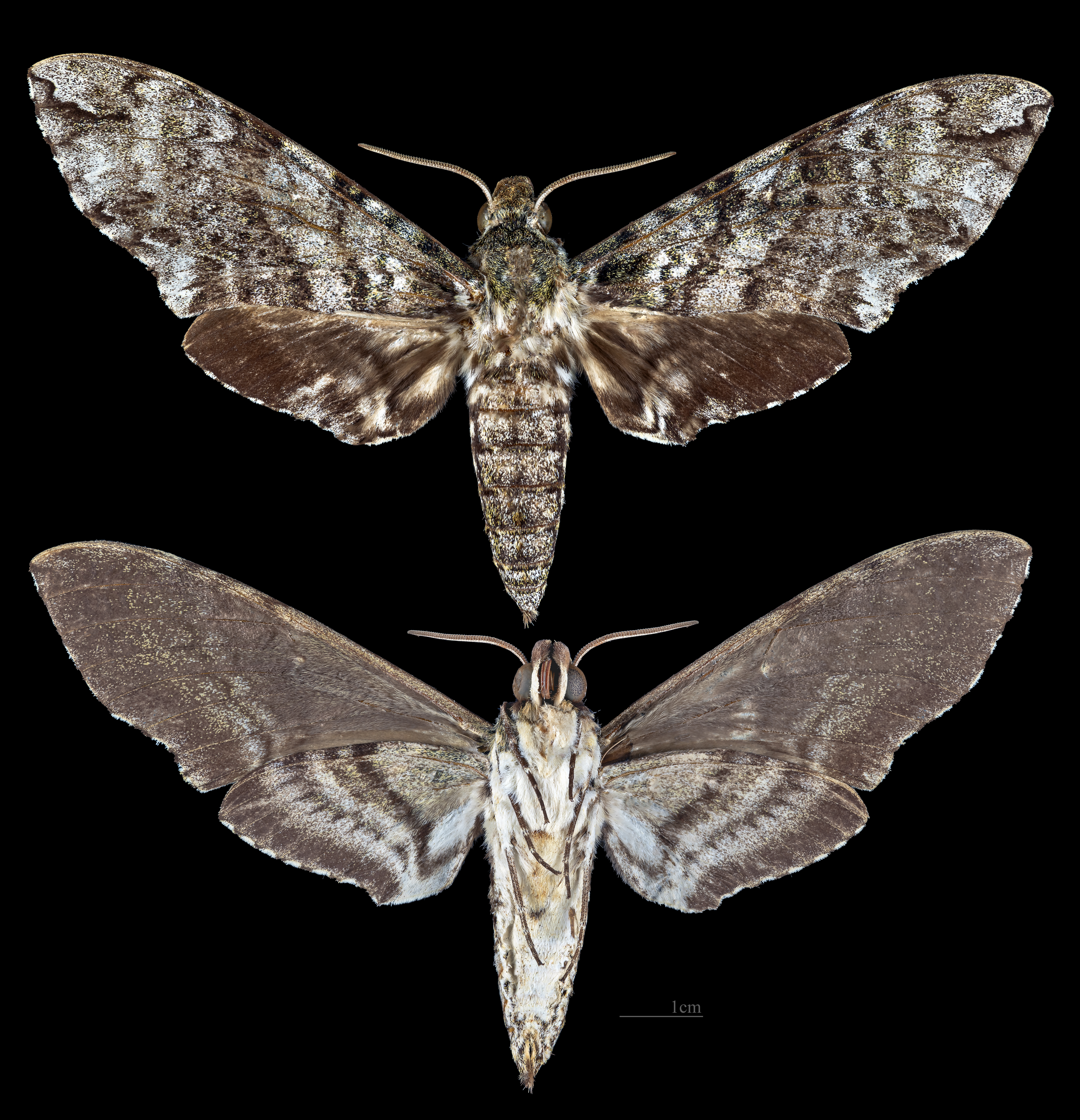
Manduca extrema

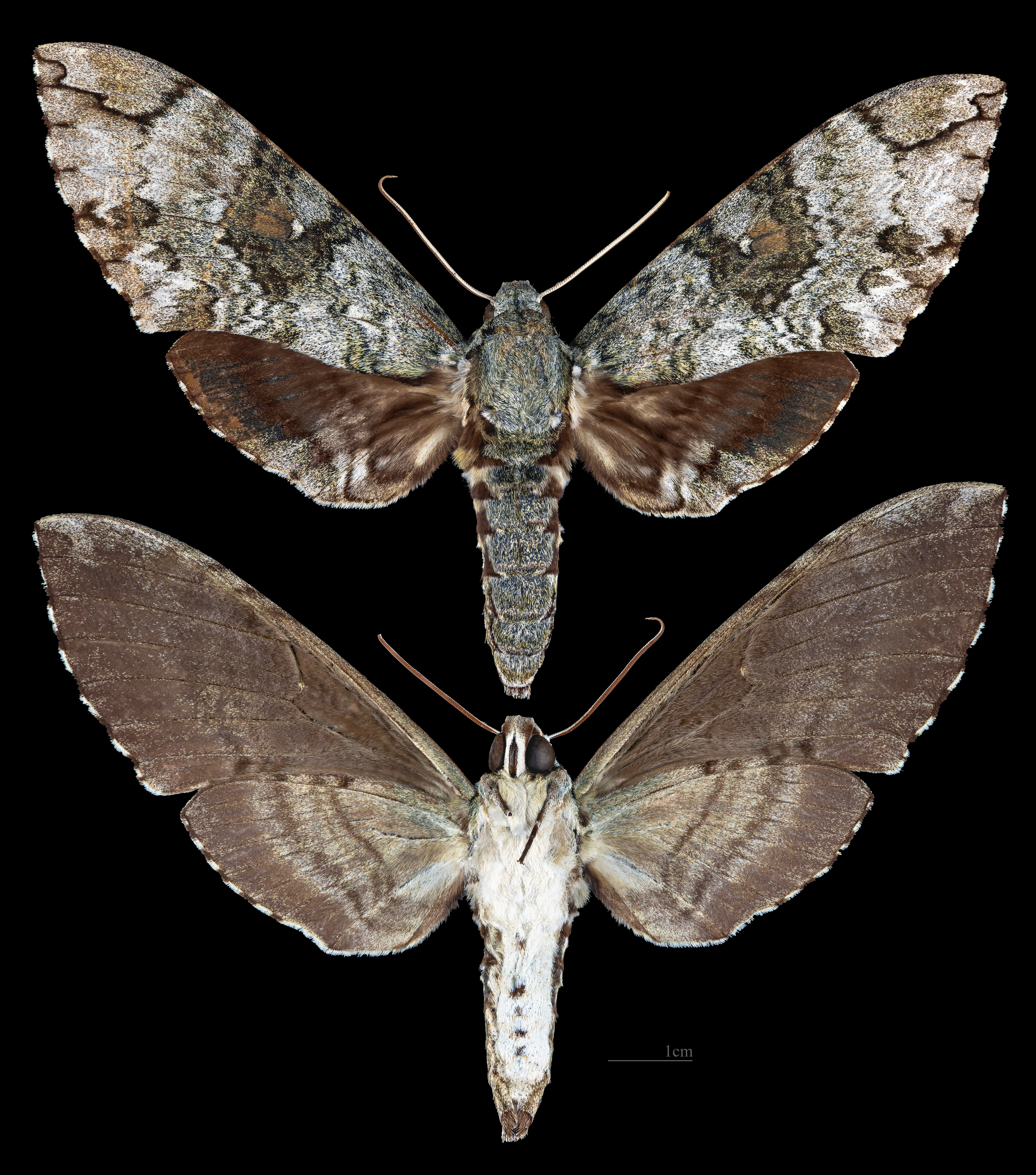
Manduca florestan

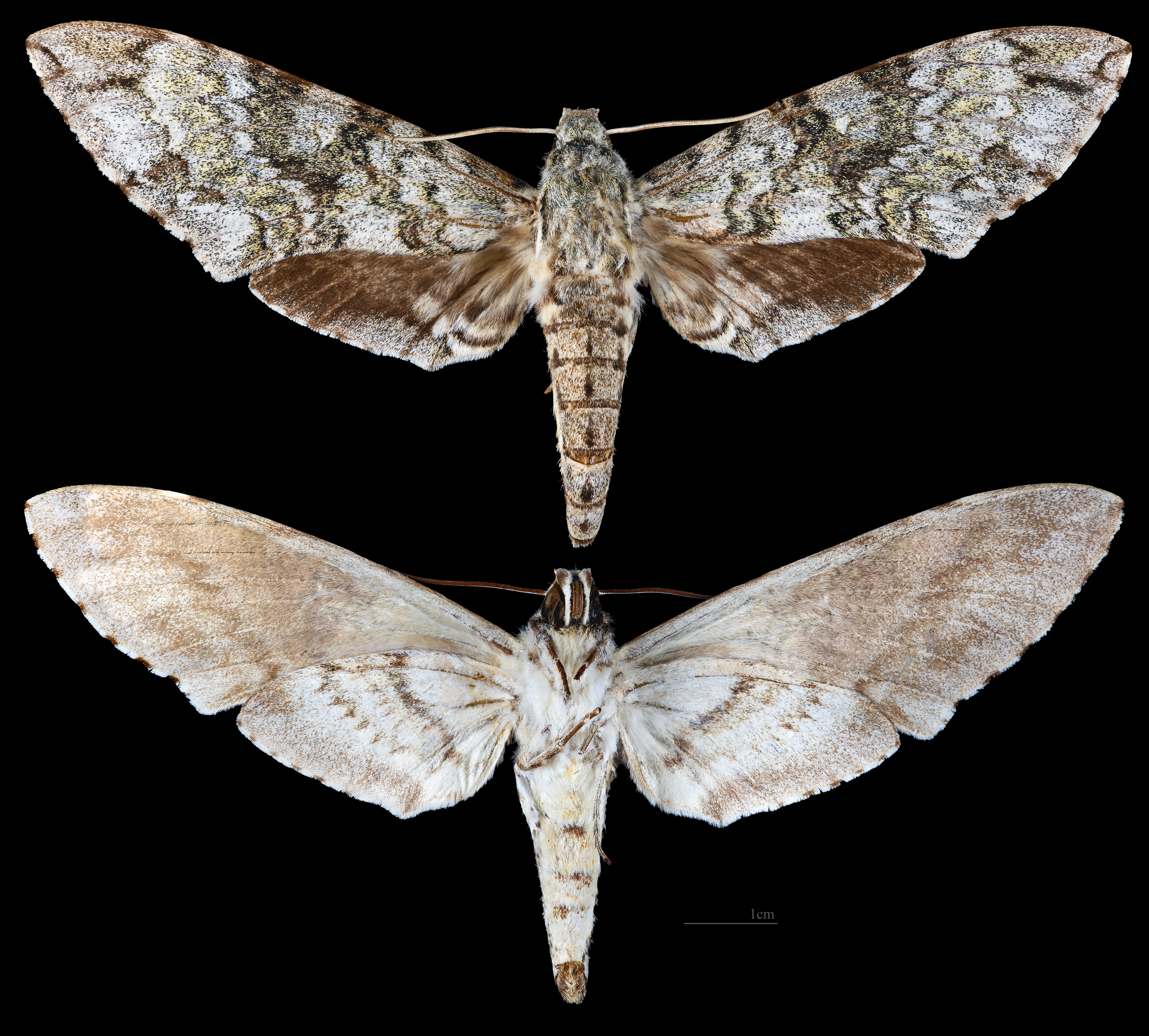
Manduca franciscae

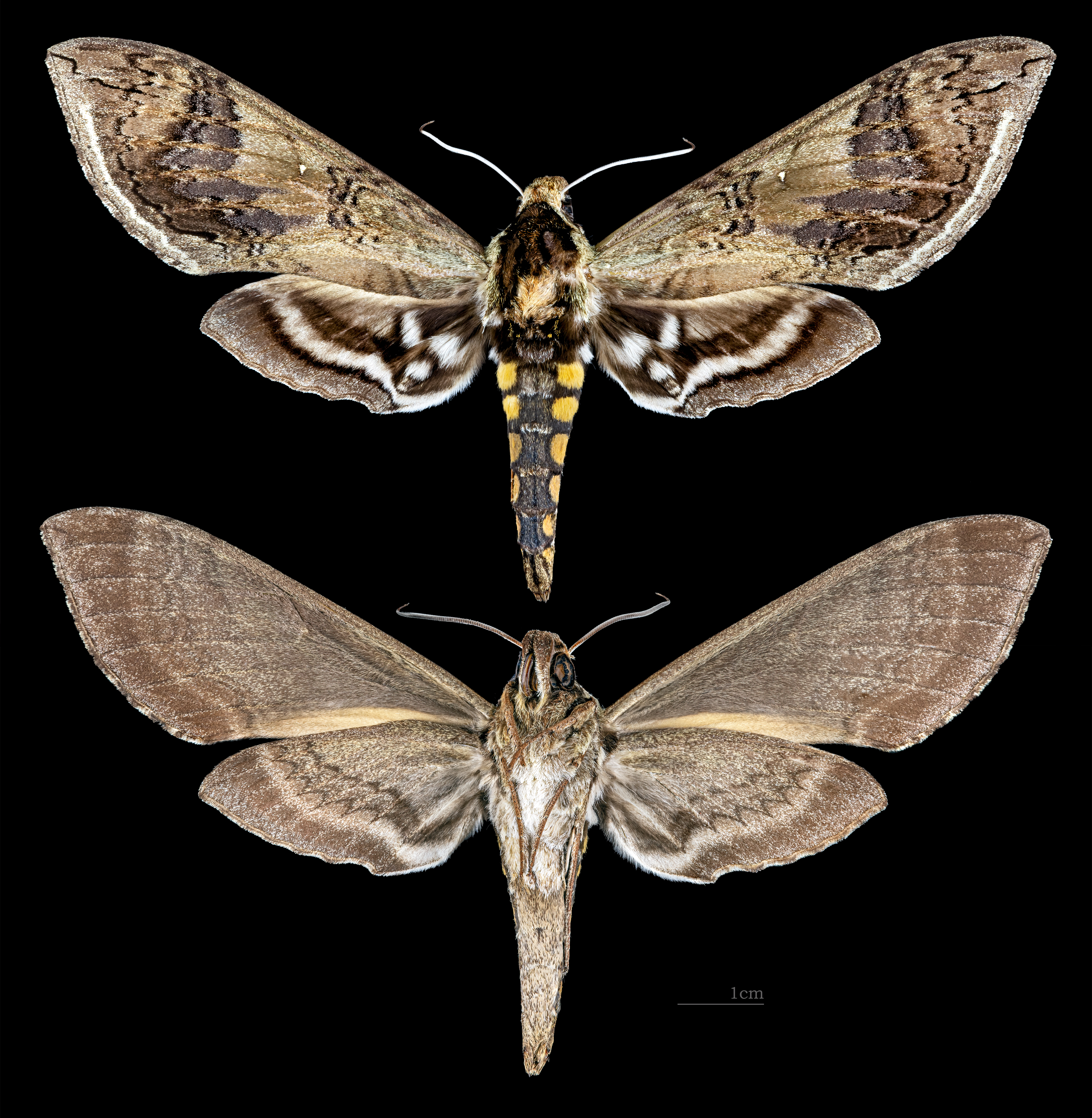
Manduca hannibal

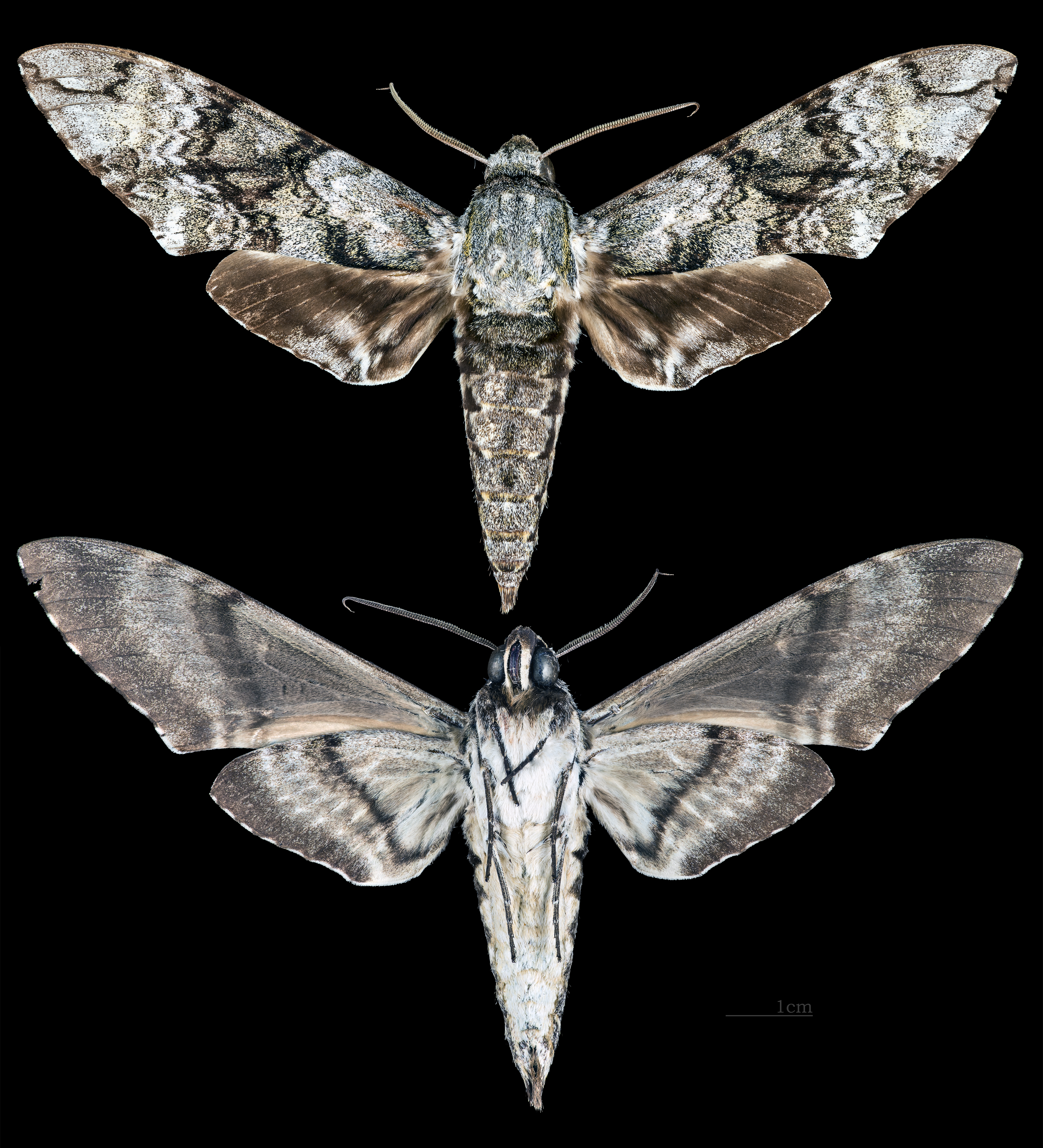
Manduca huascara

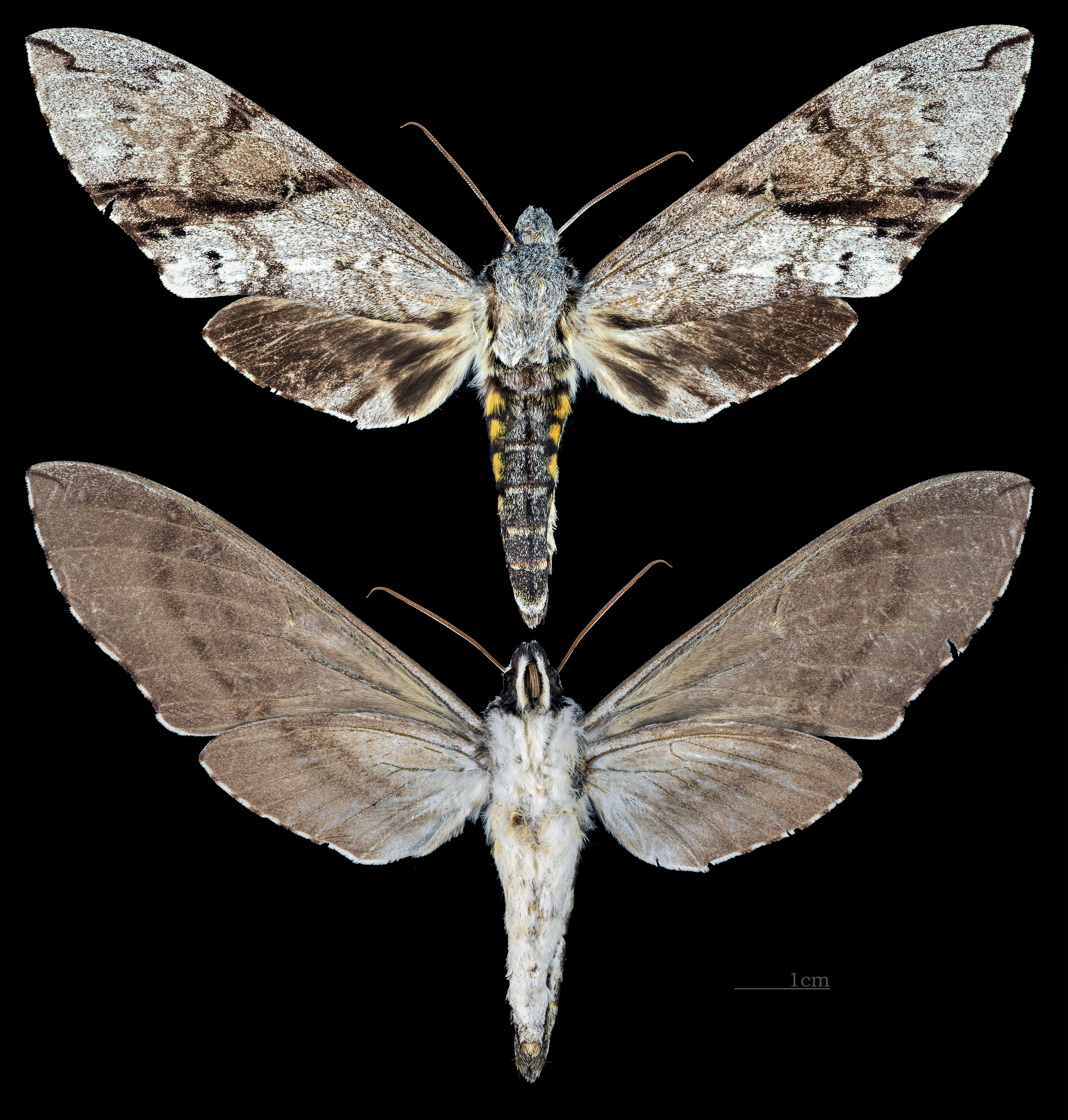
Manduca incisa

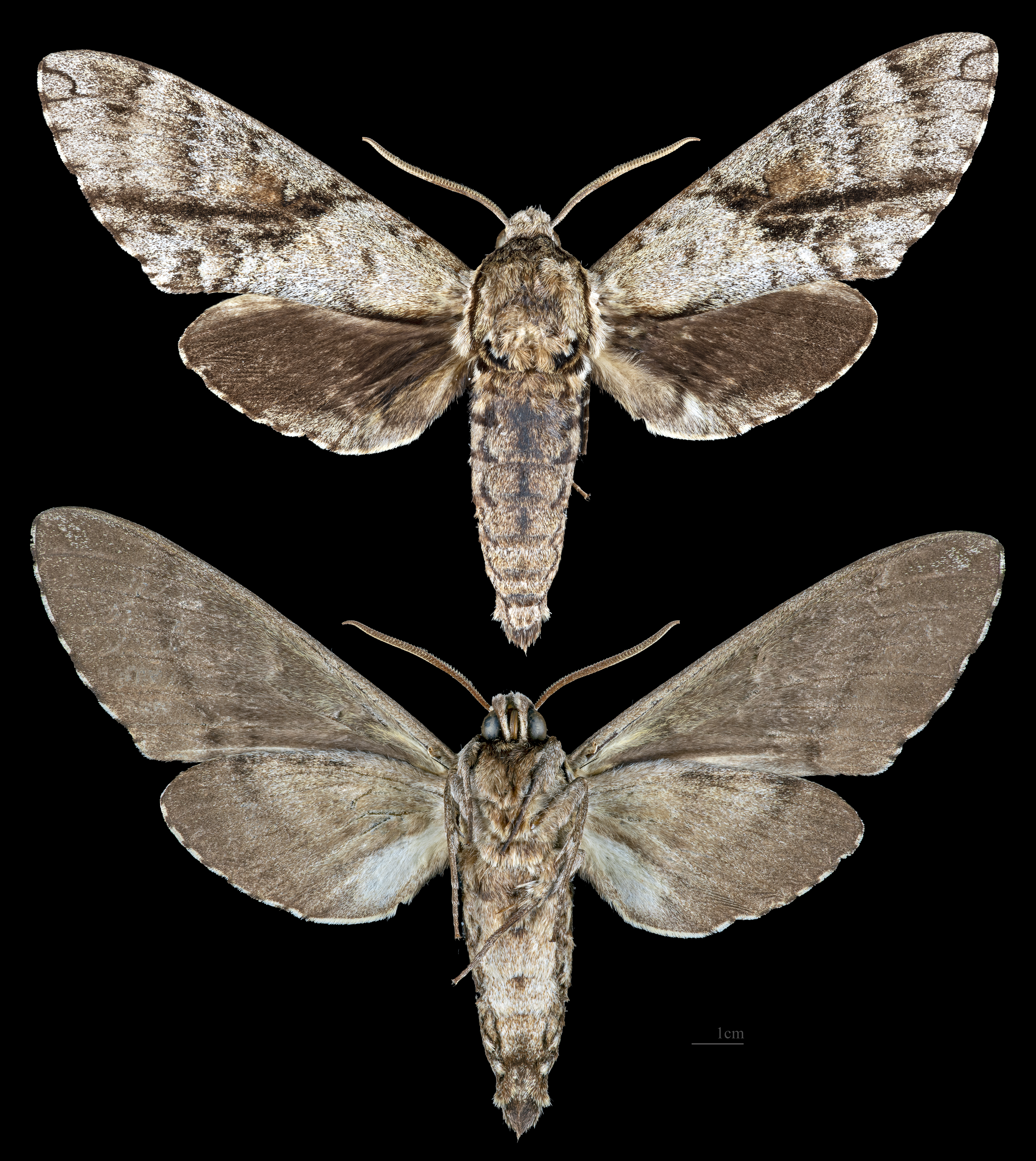
Manduca jasminearum

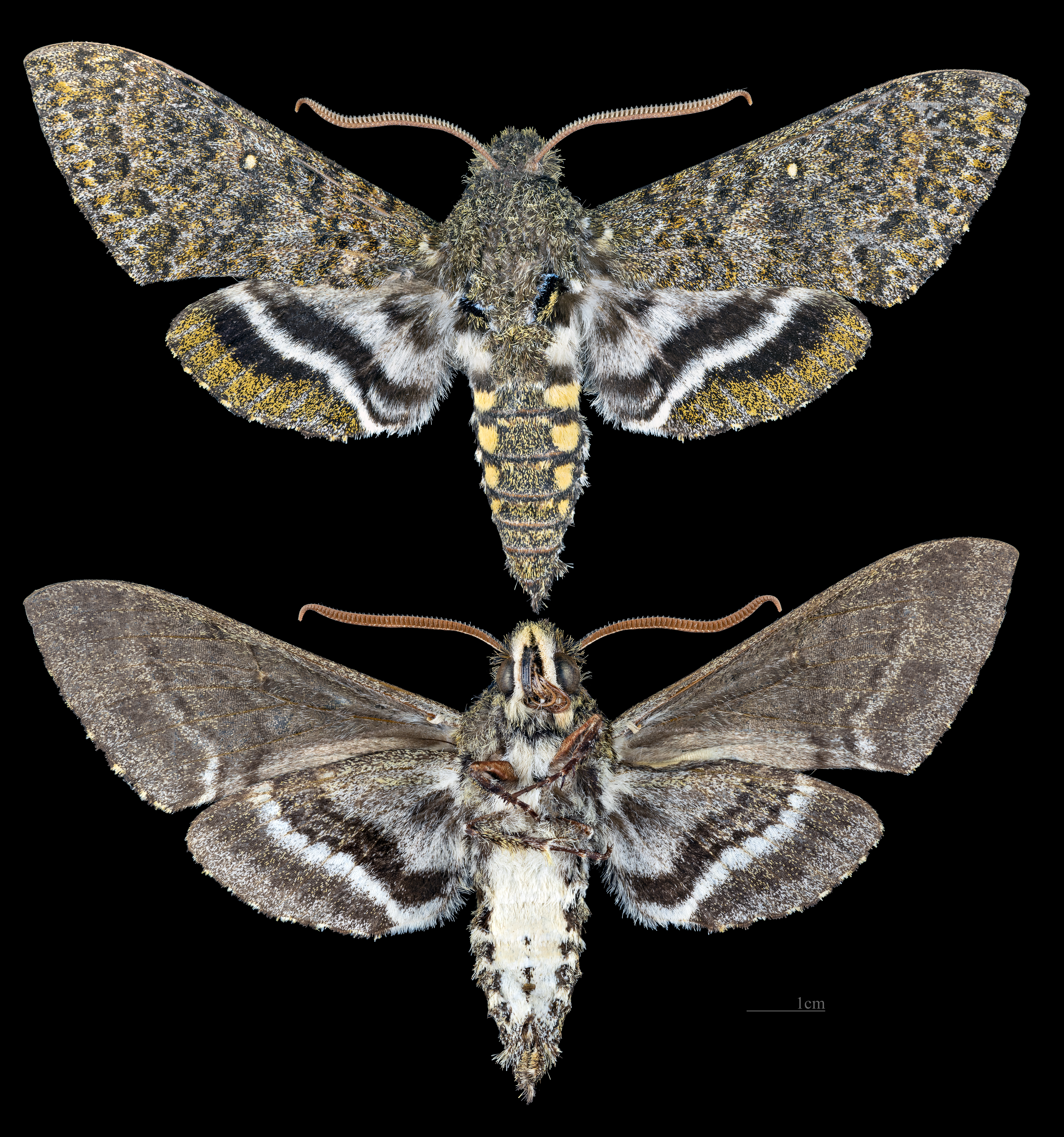
Manduca jordani

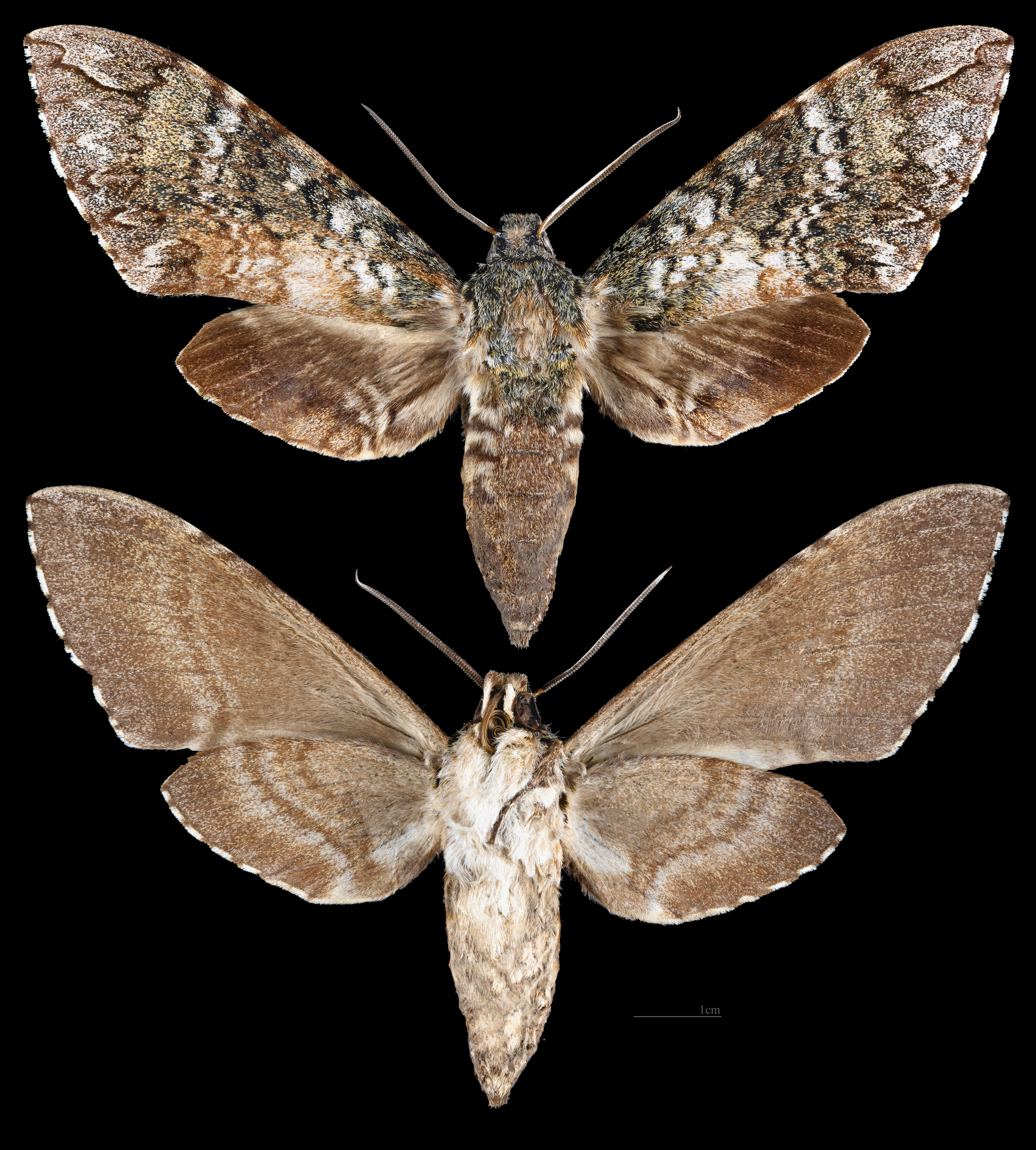
Manduca lanuginosa

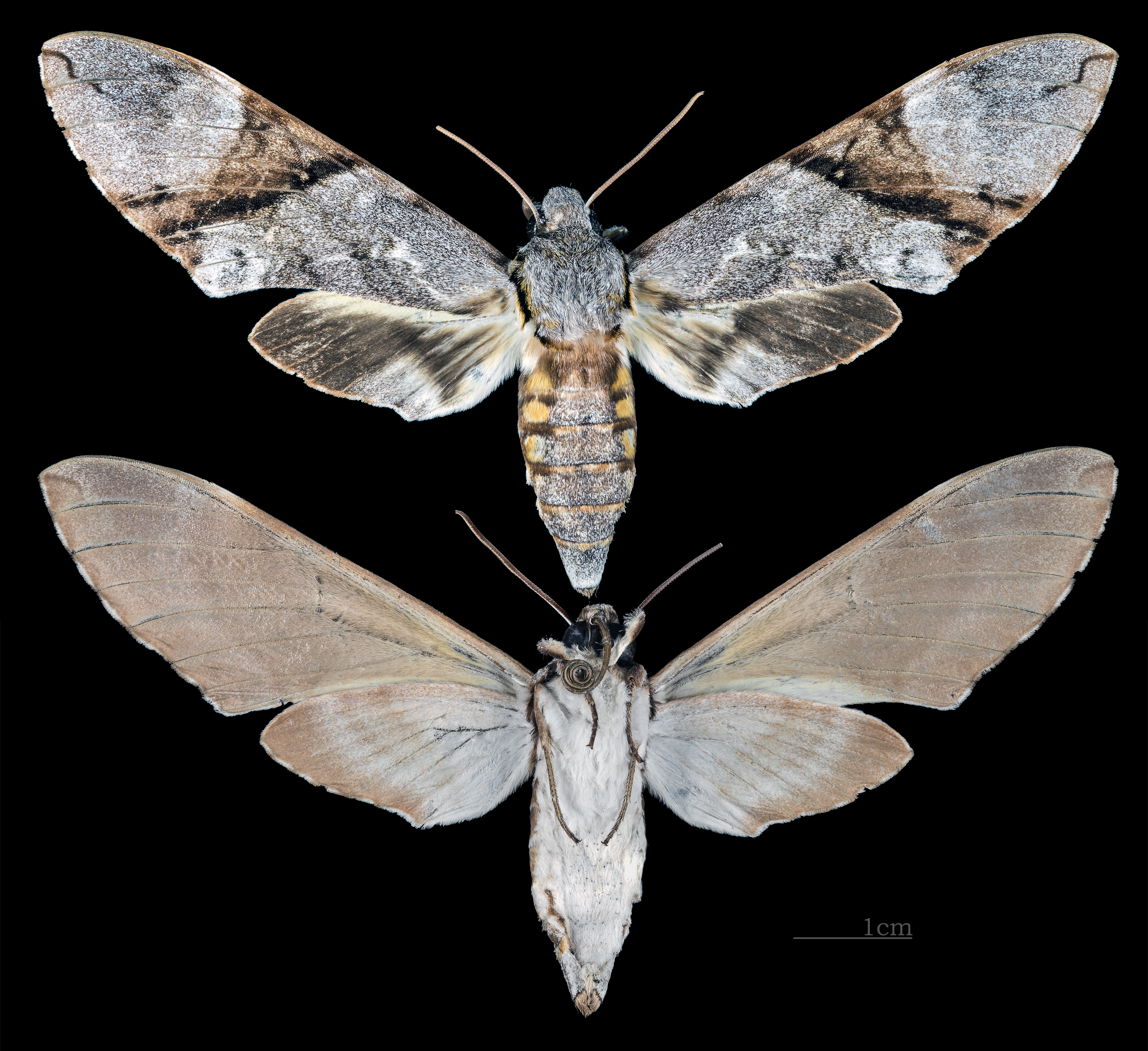
Manduca lefeburii

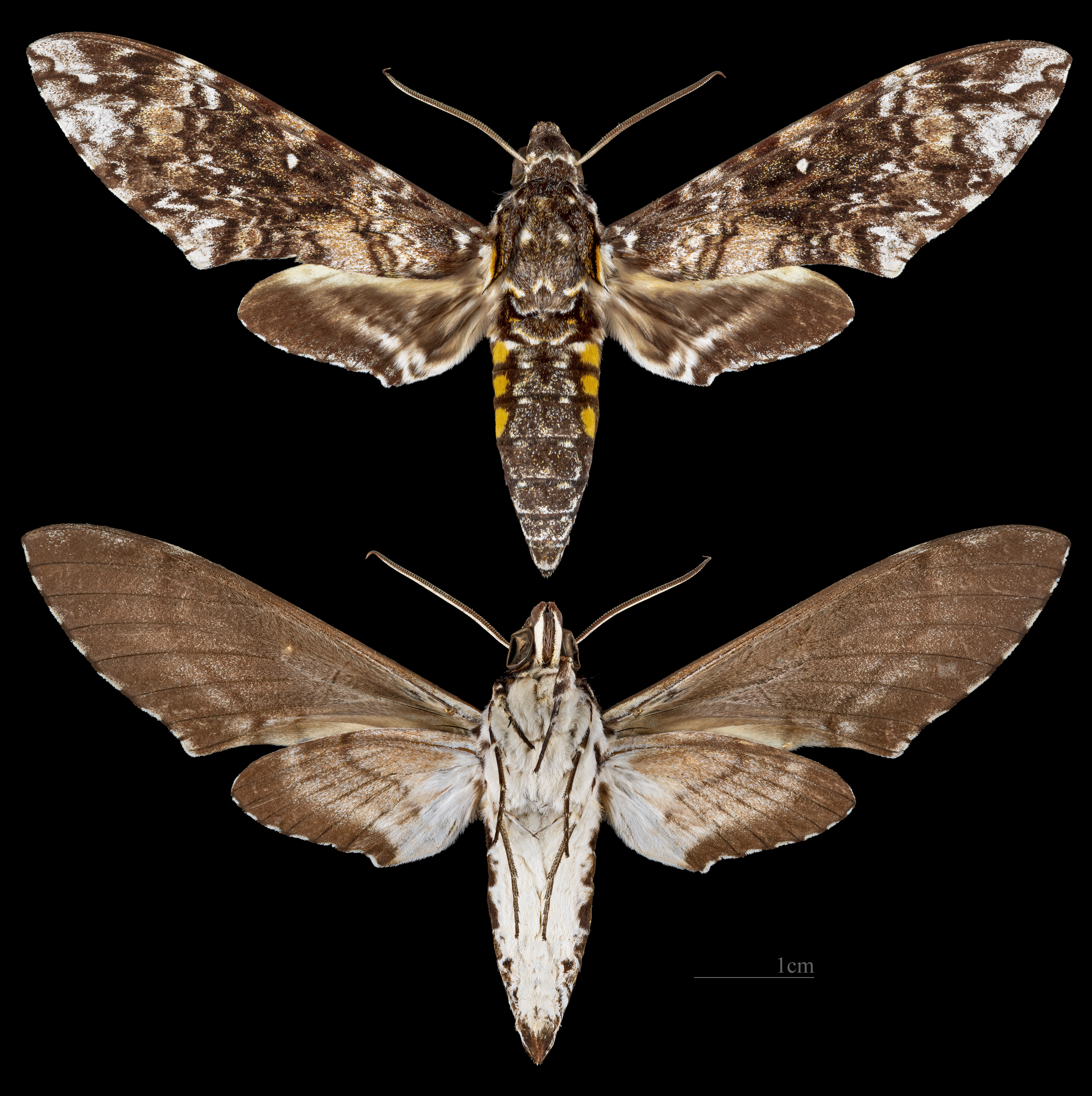
Manduca leucospila

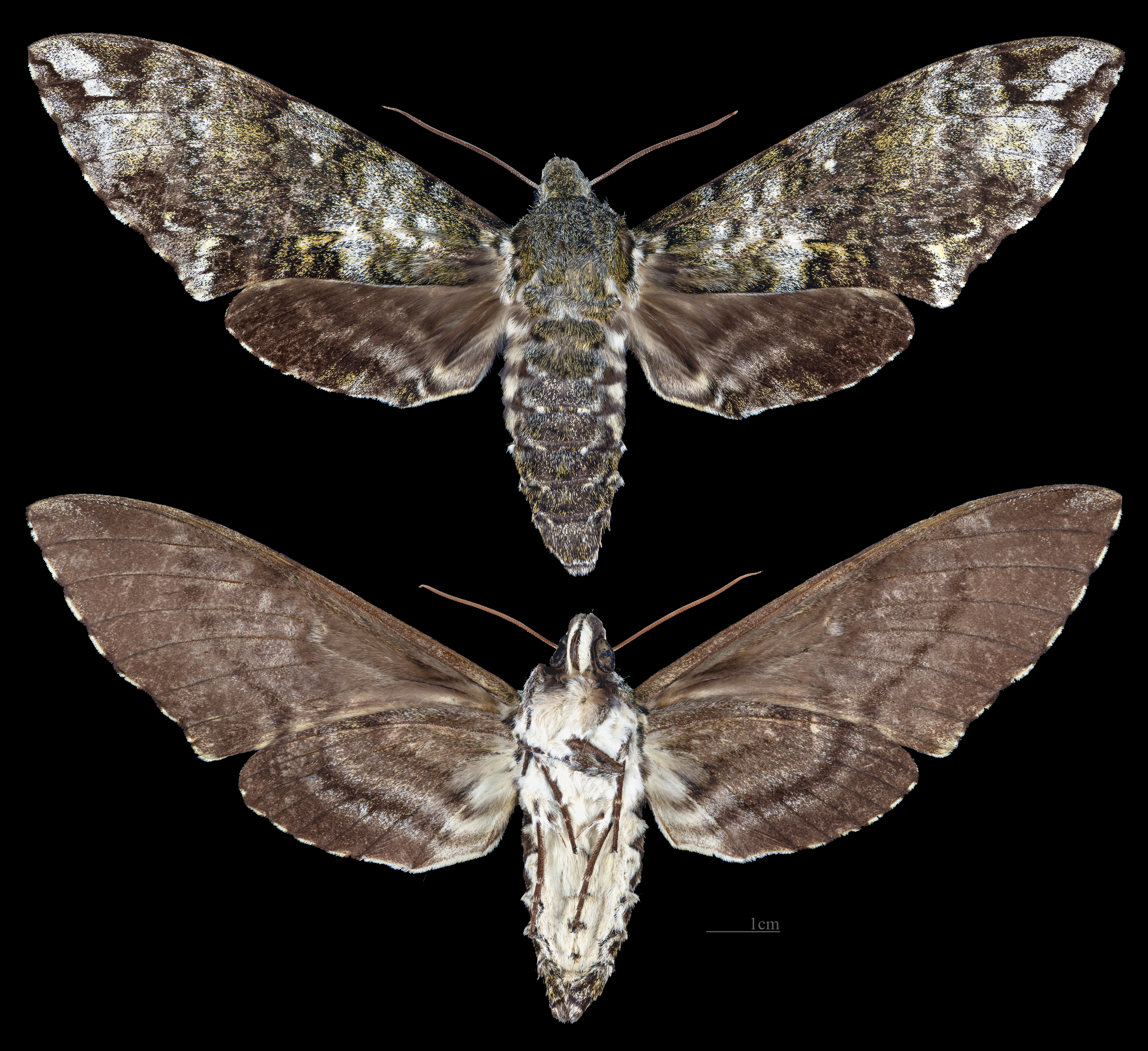
Manduca lichenea

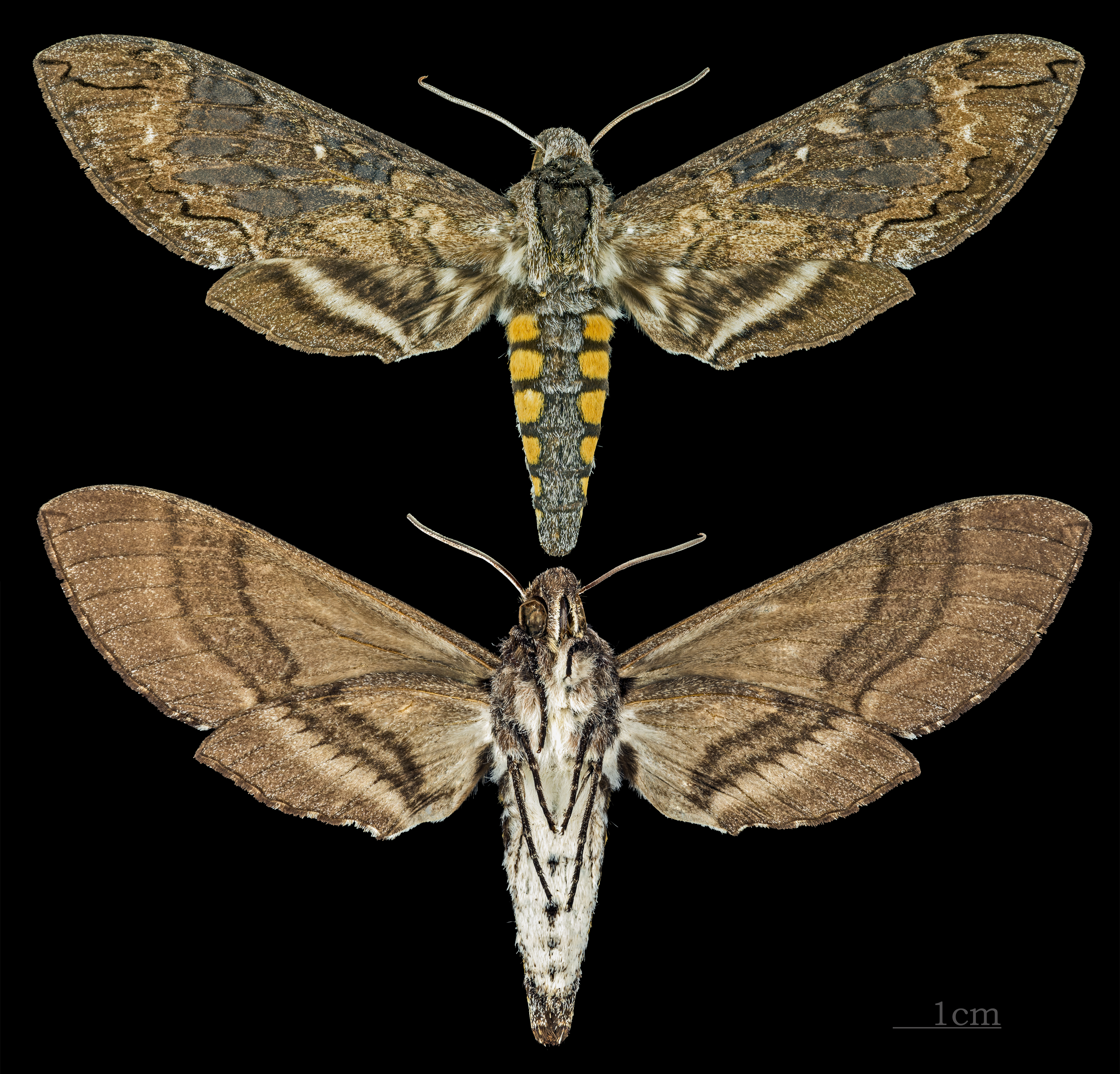
Manduca lucetius

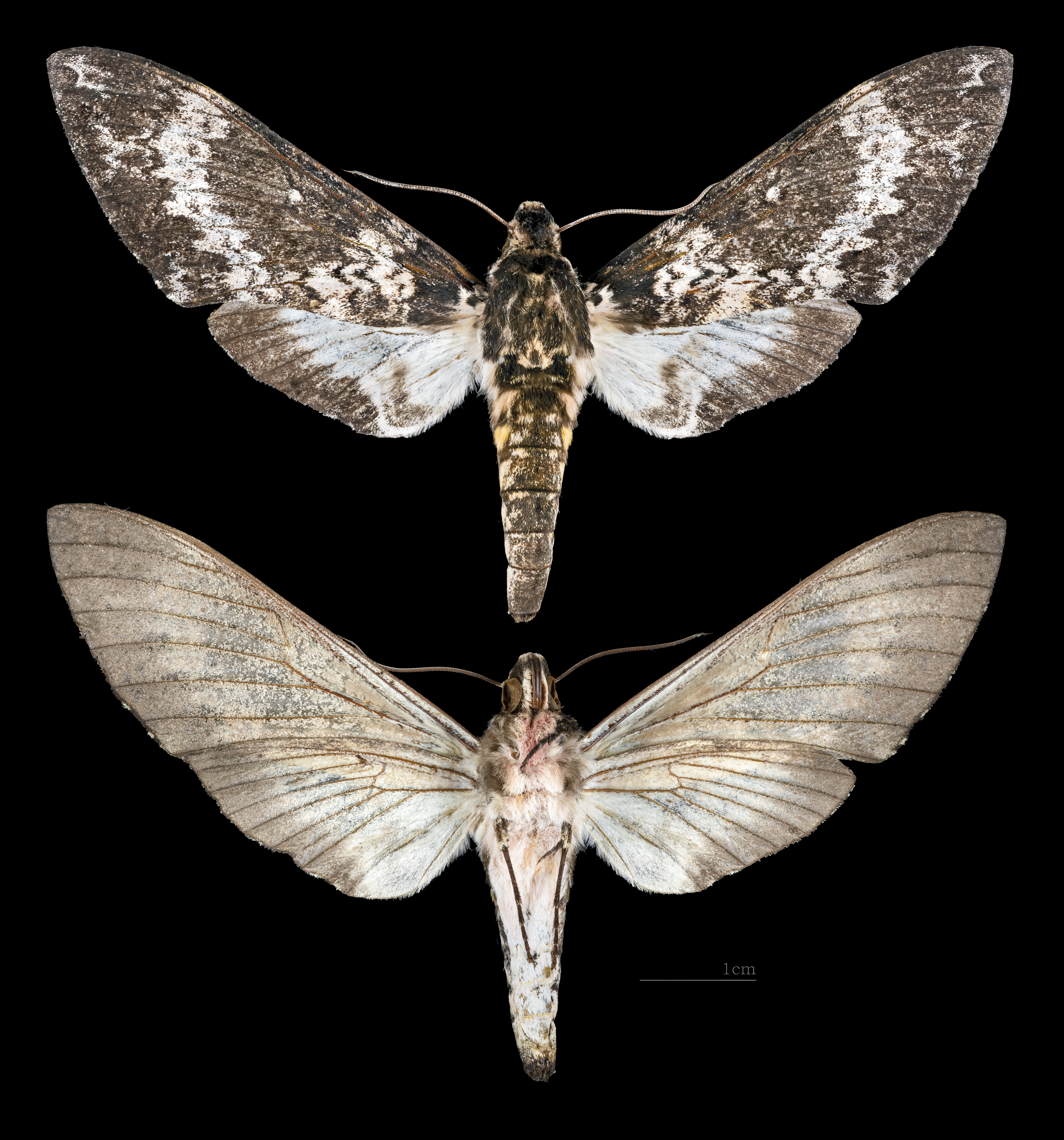
Manduca manducoides

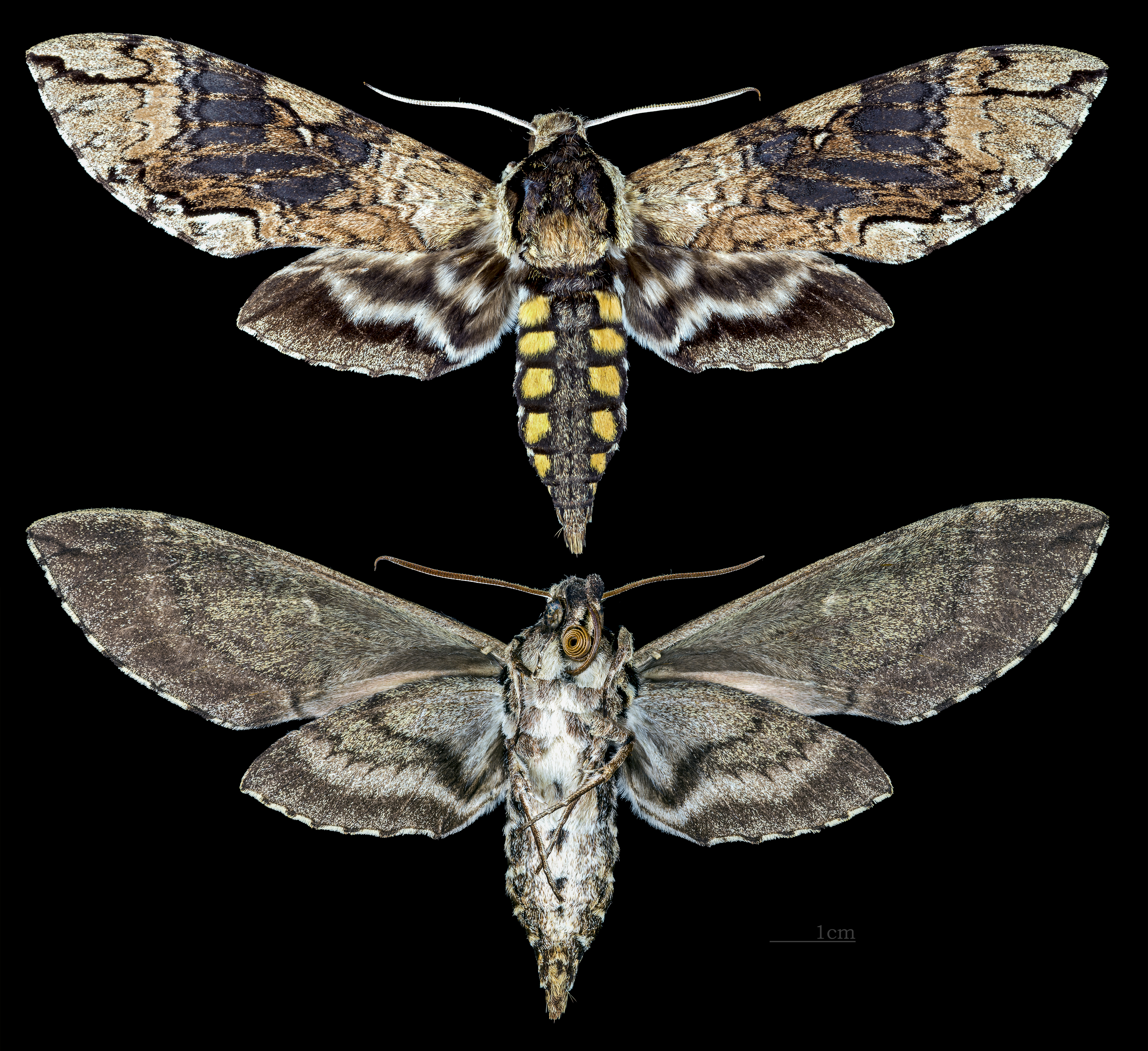
Manduca morelia

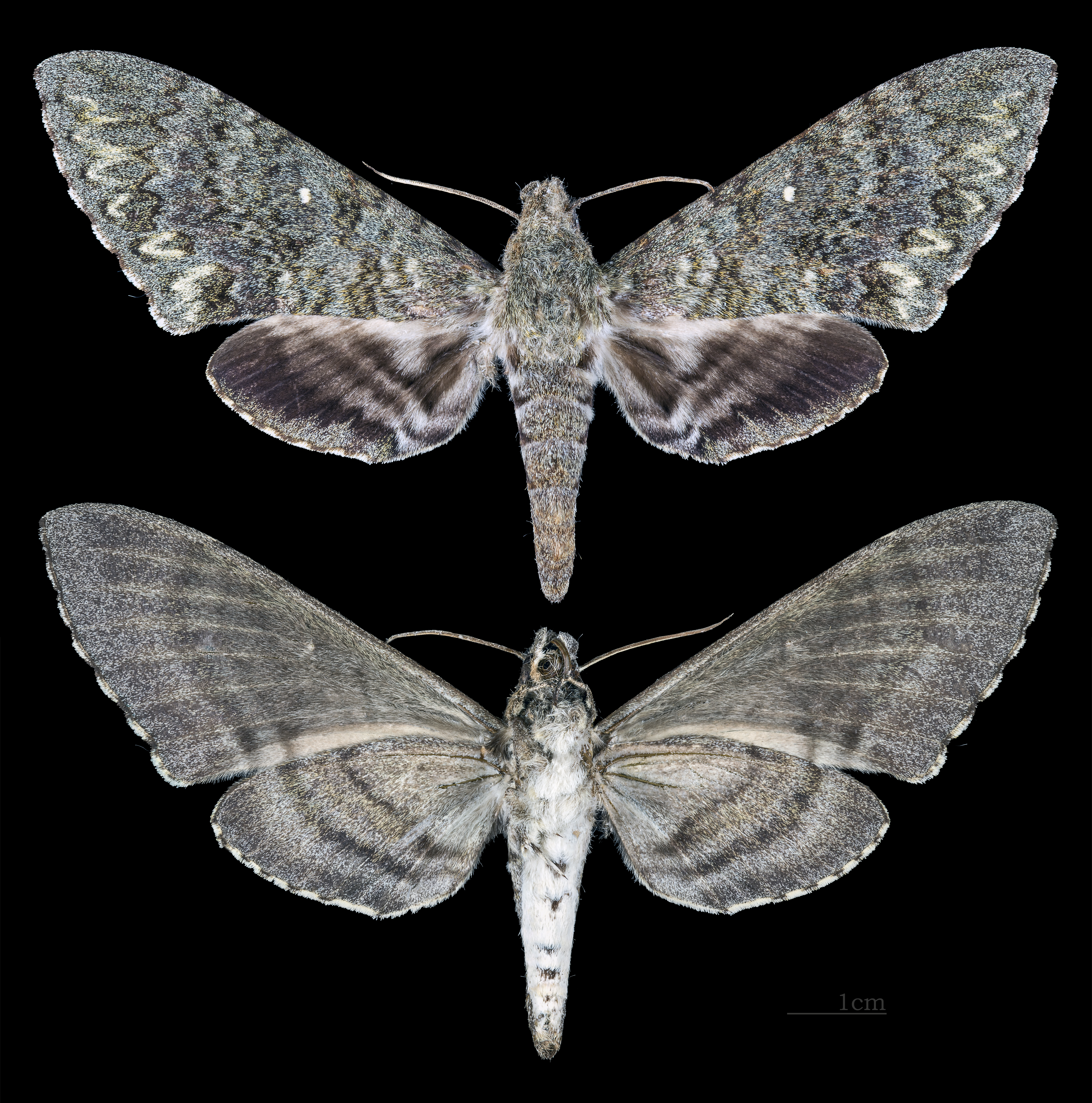
Manduca muscosa

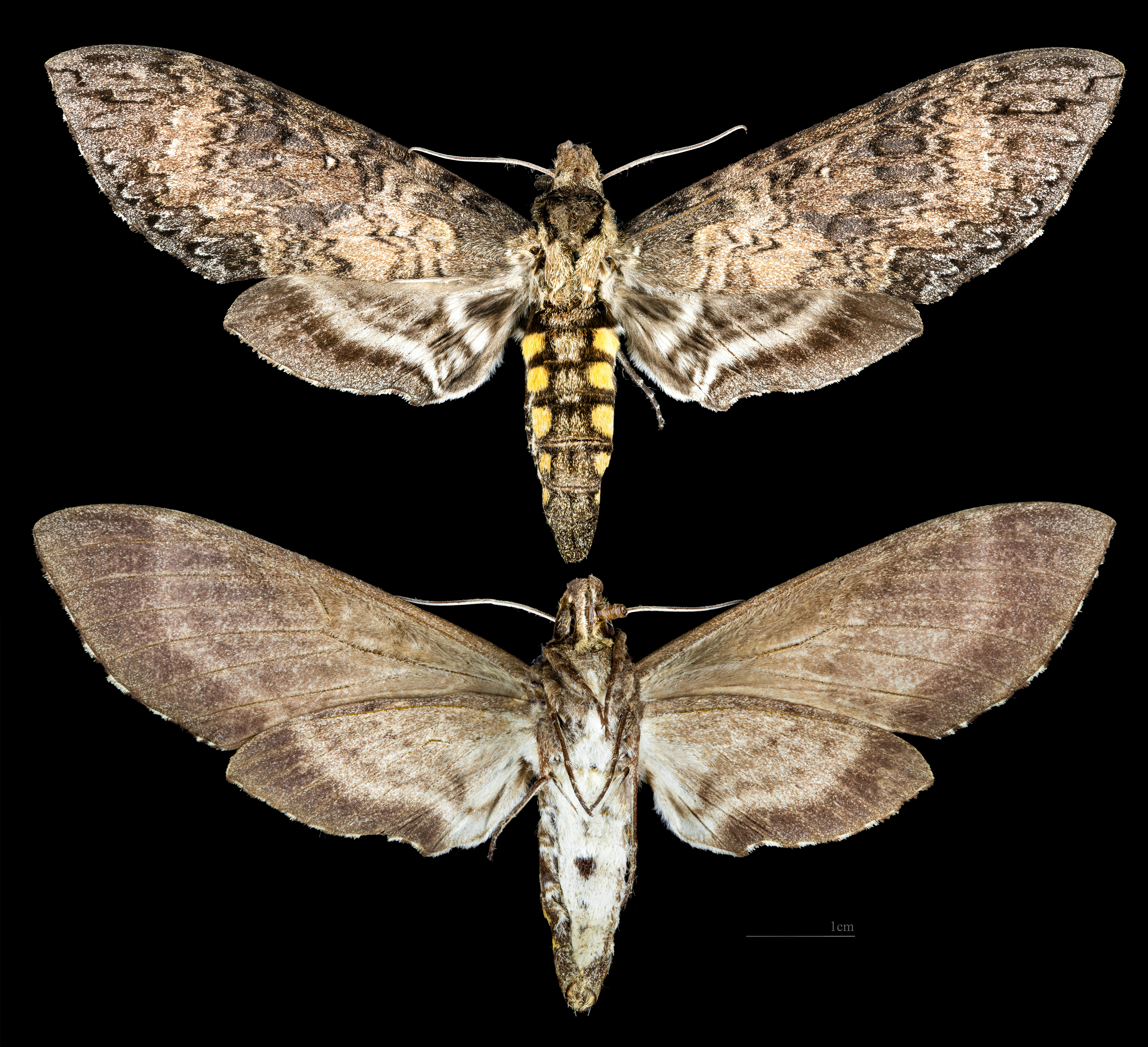
Manduca occulta

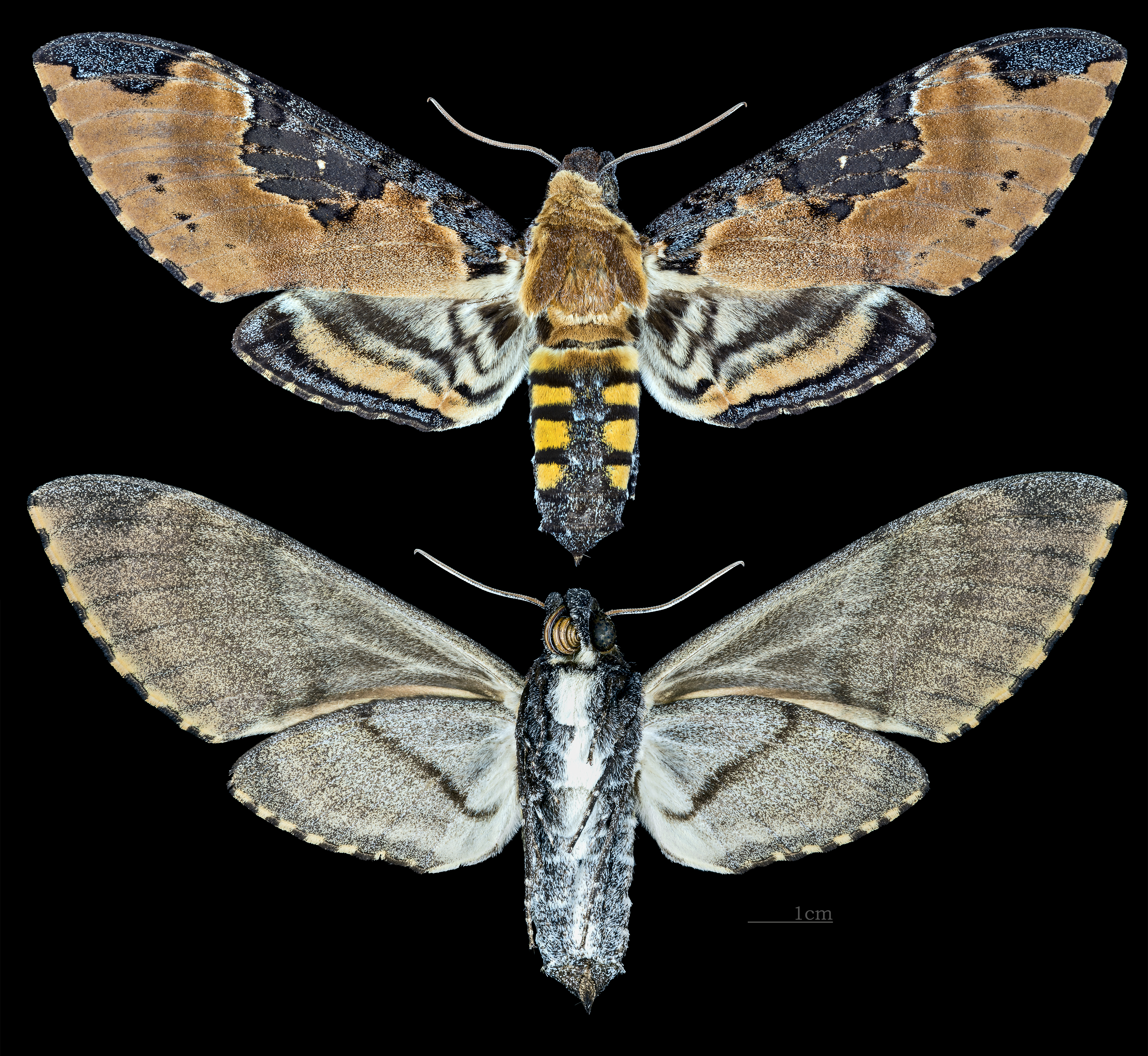
Manduca ochus

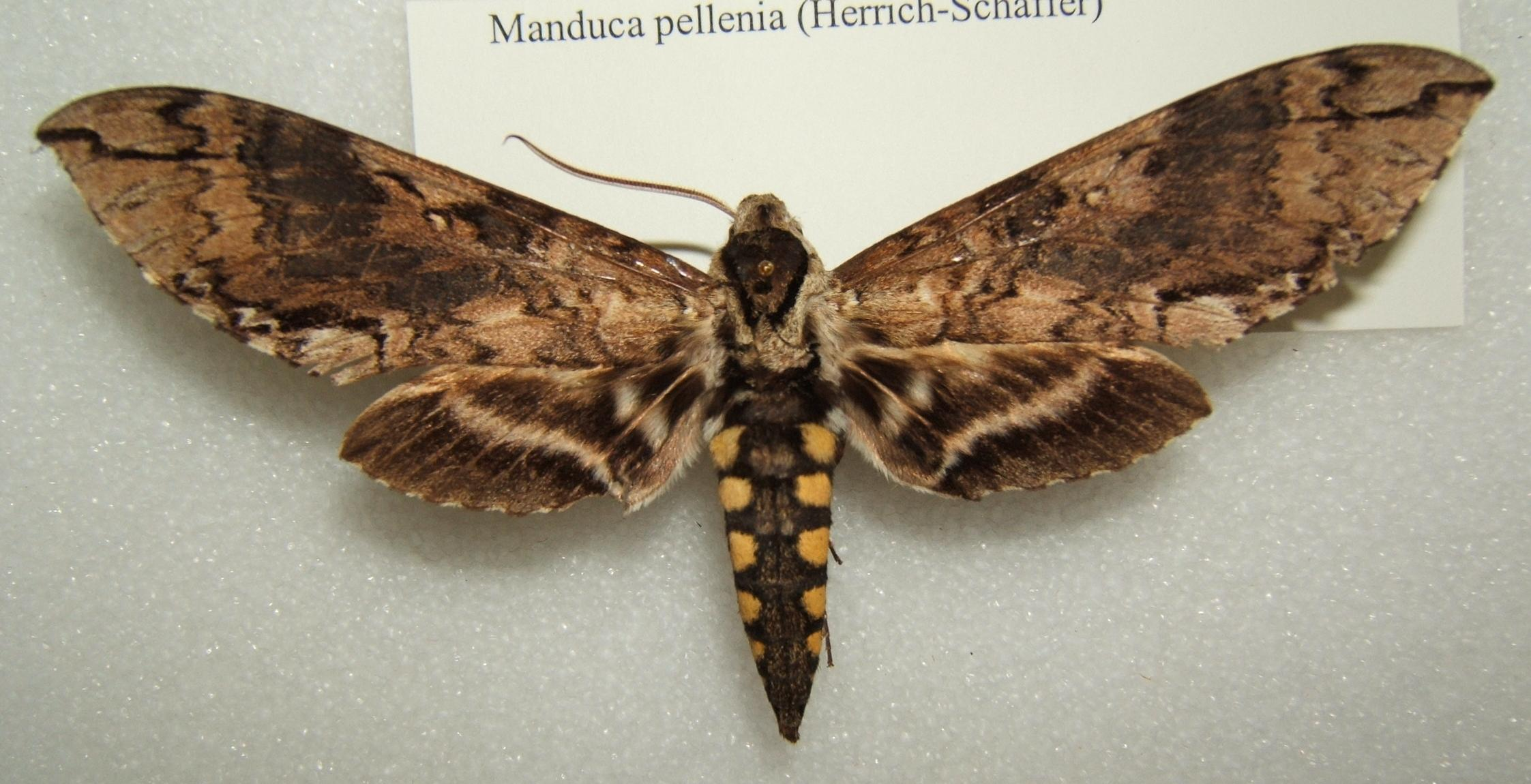
Manduca pellenia

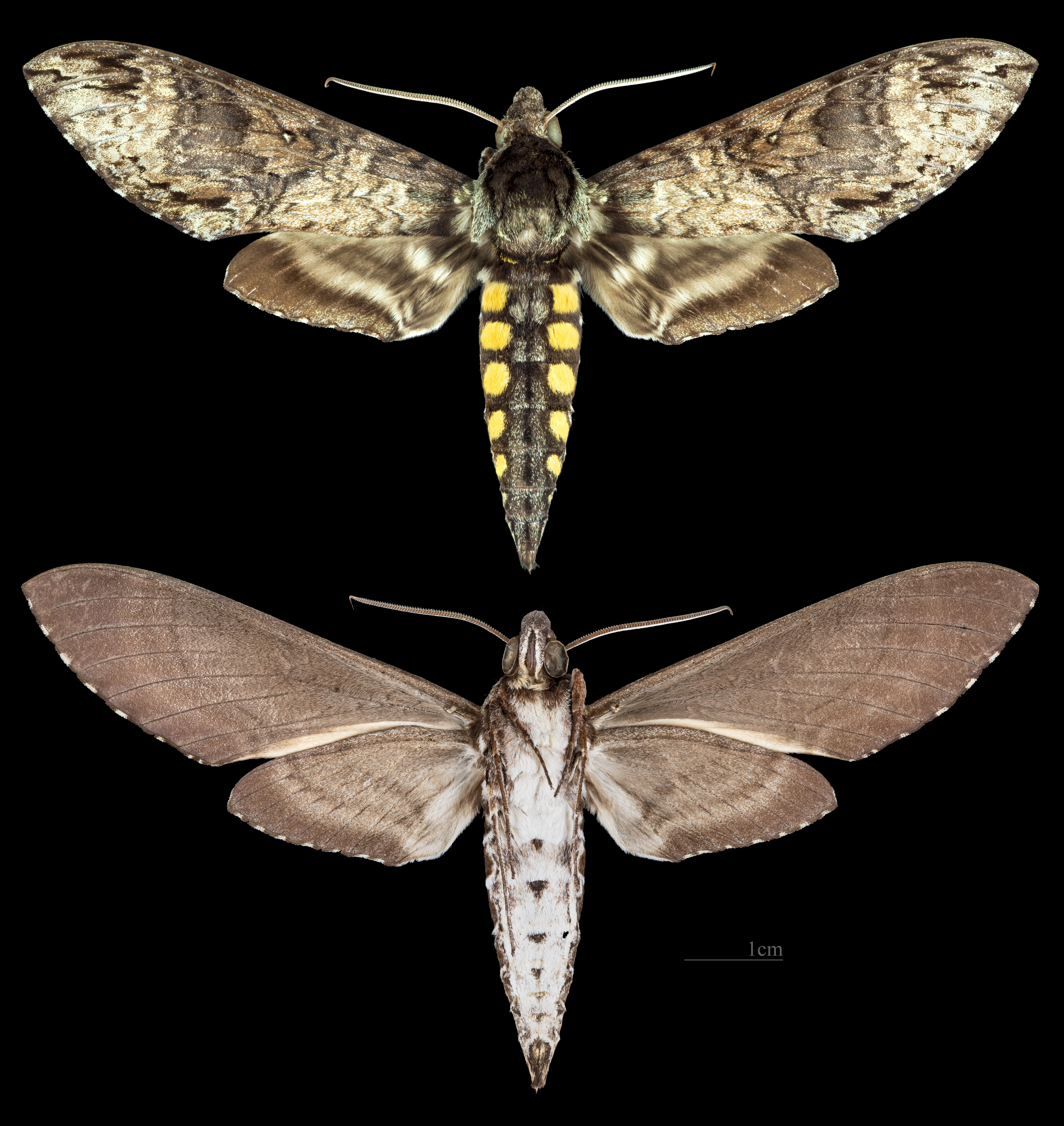
Manduca perplexa

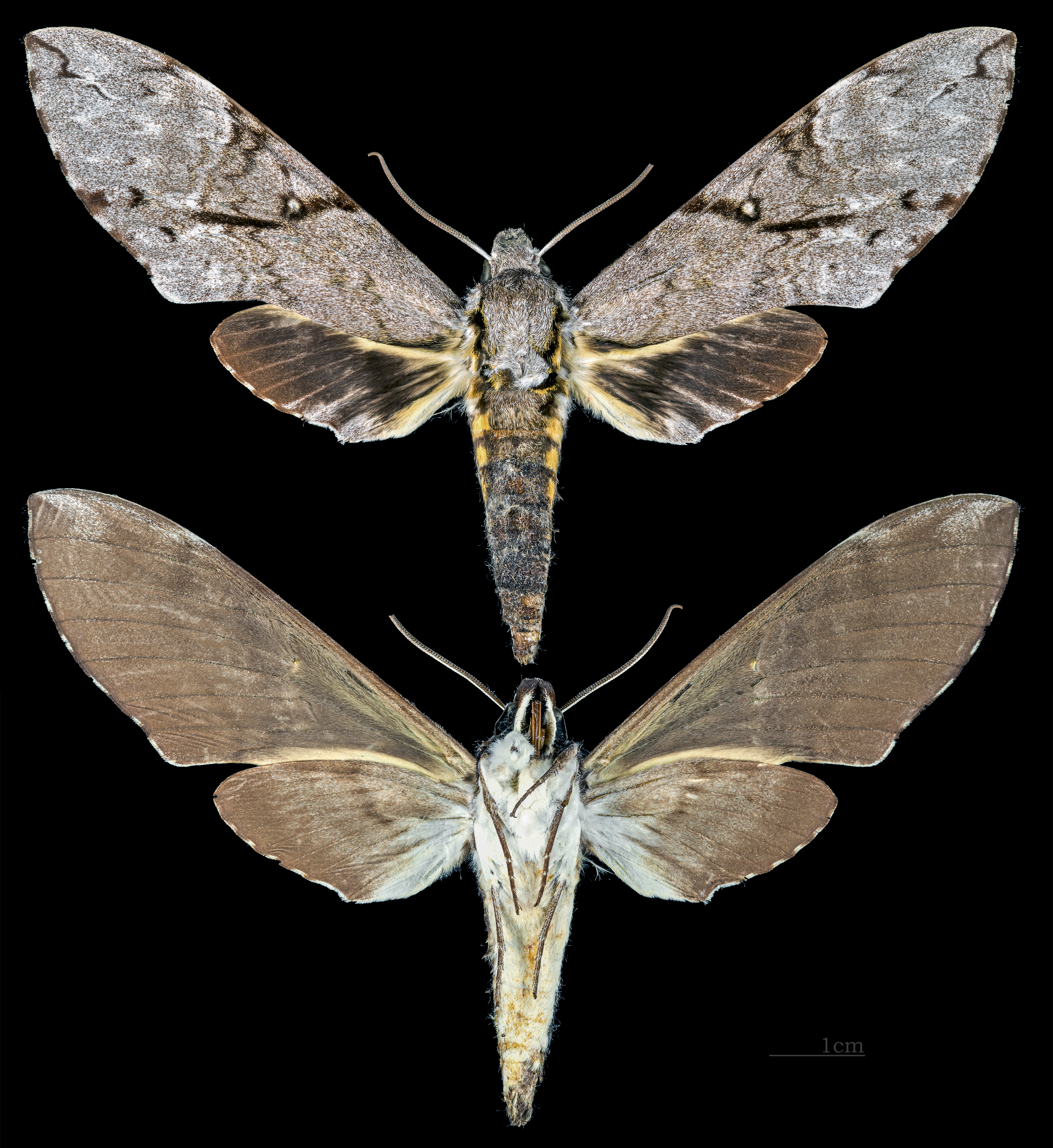
Manduca prestoni

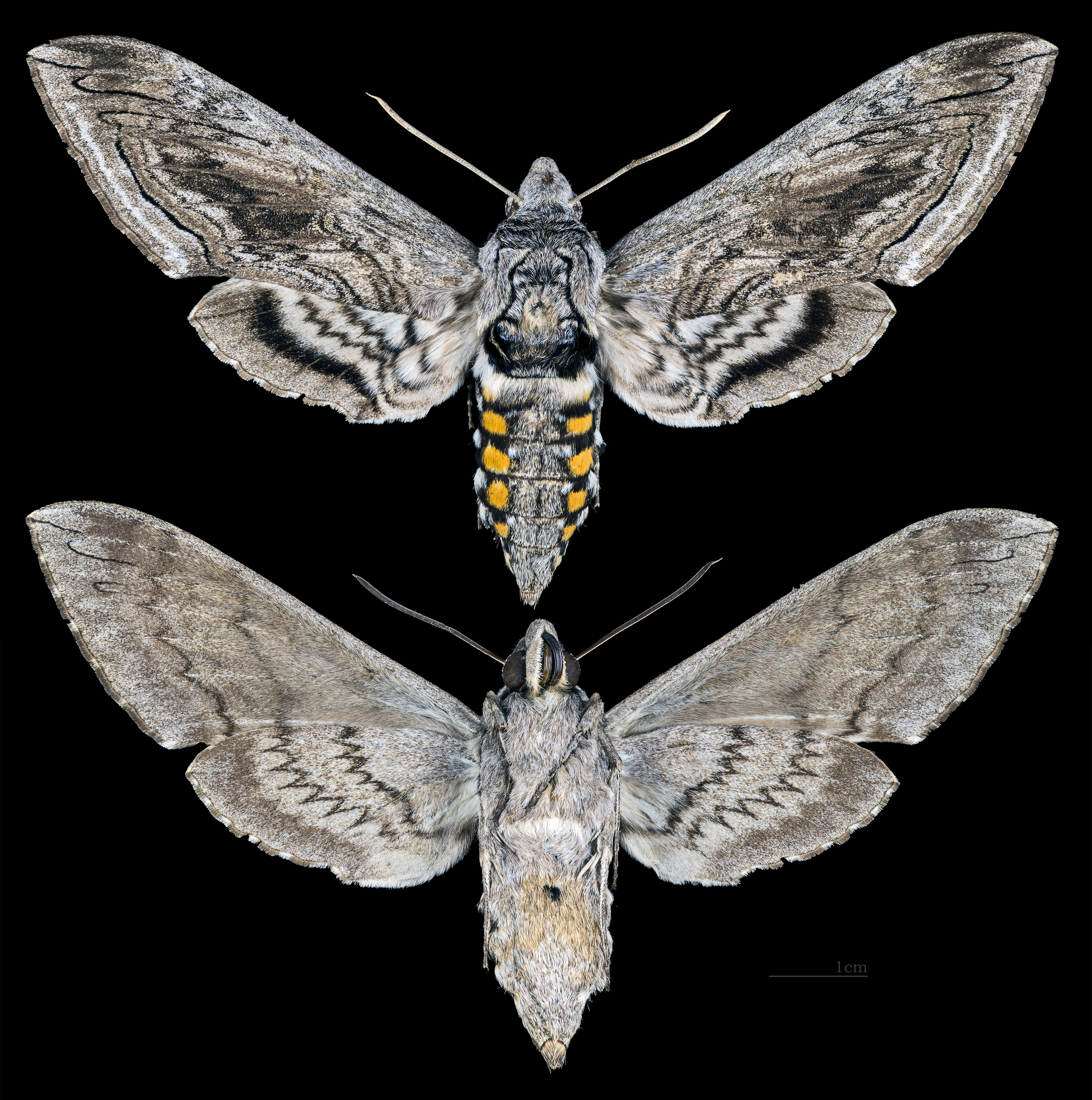
Manduca quinquemaculata

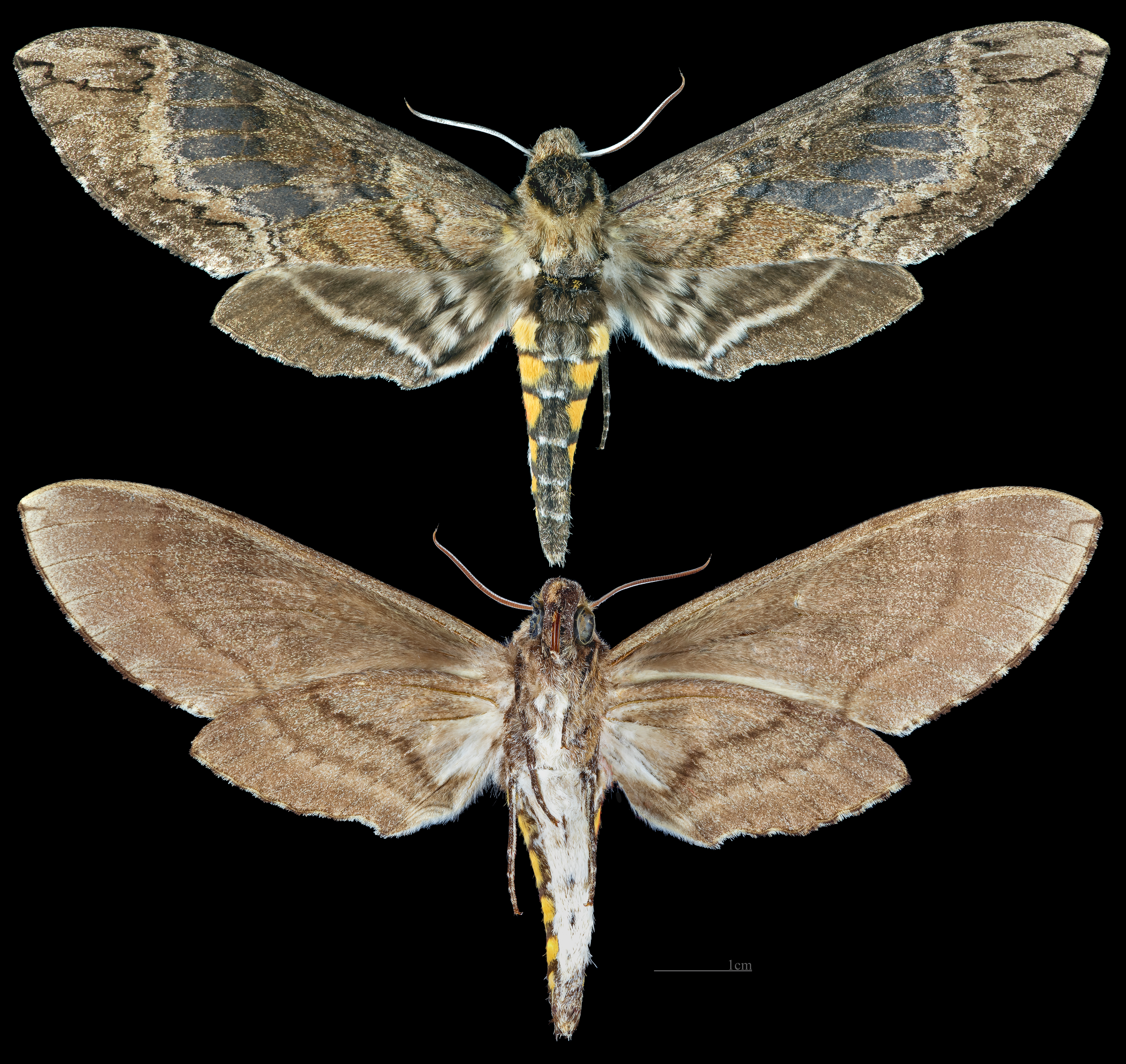
Manduca reducta

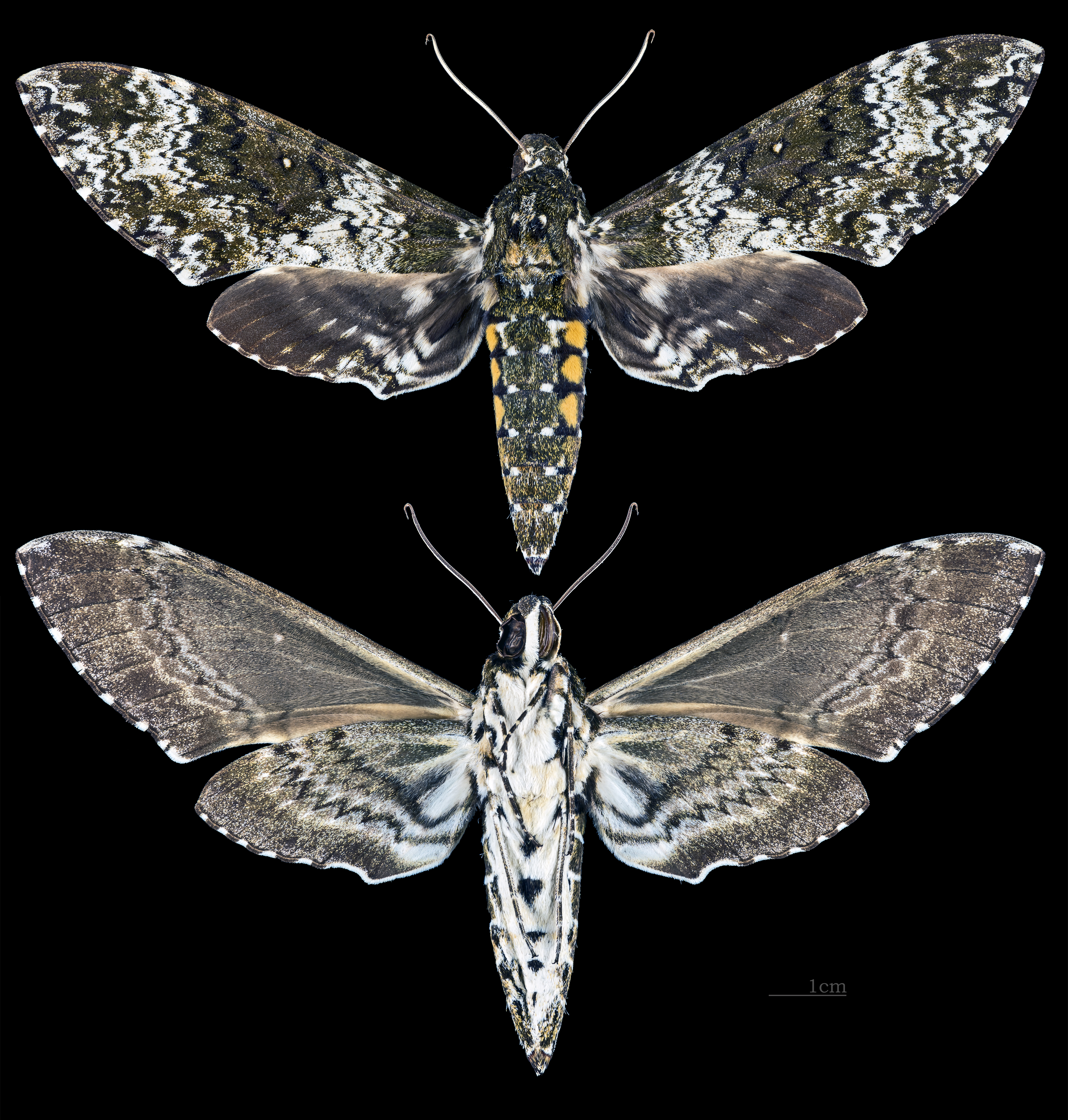
Manduca rustica

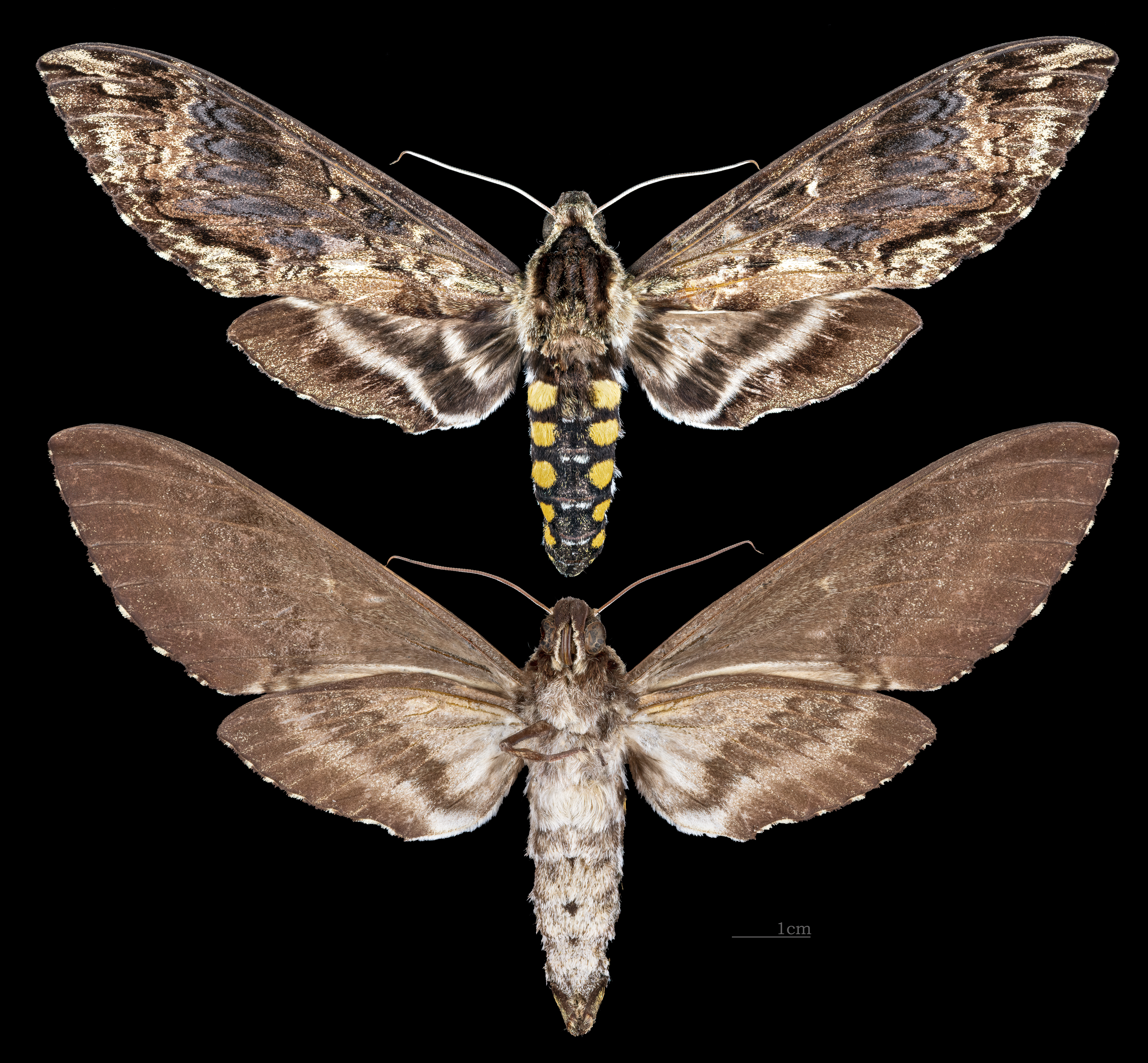
Manduca scutata

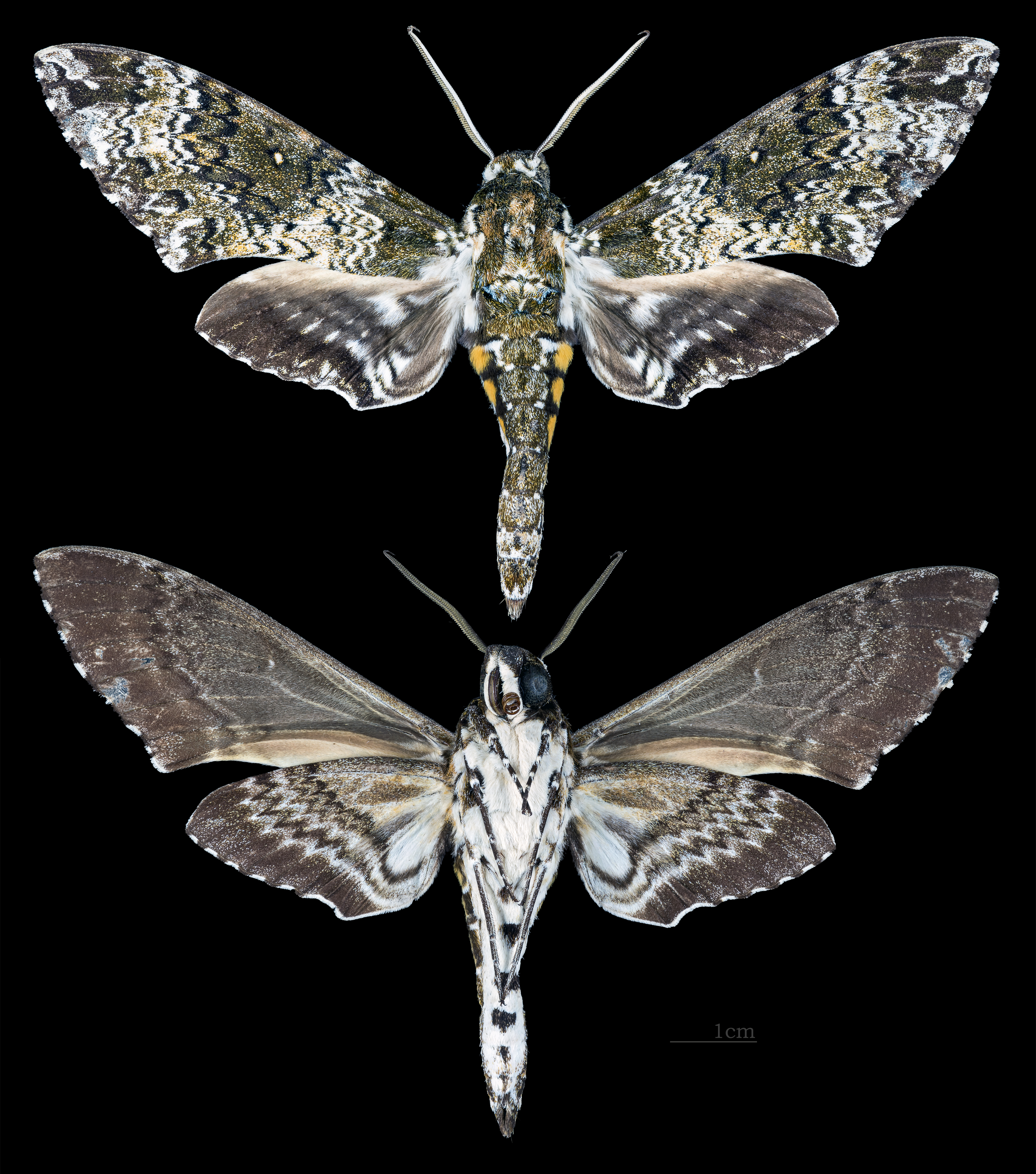
Manduca sesquiplex

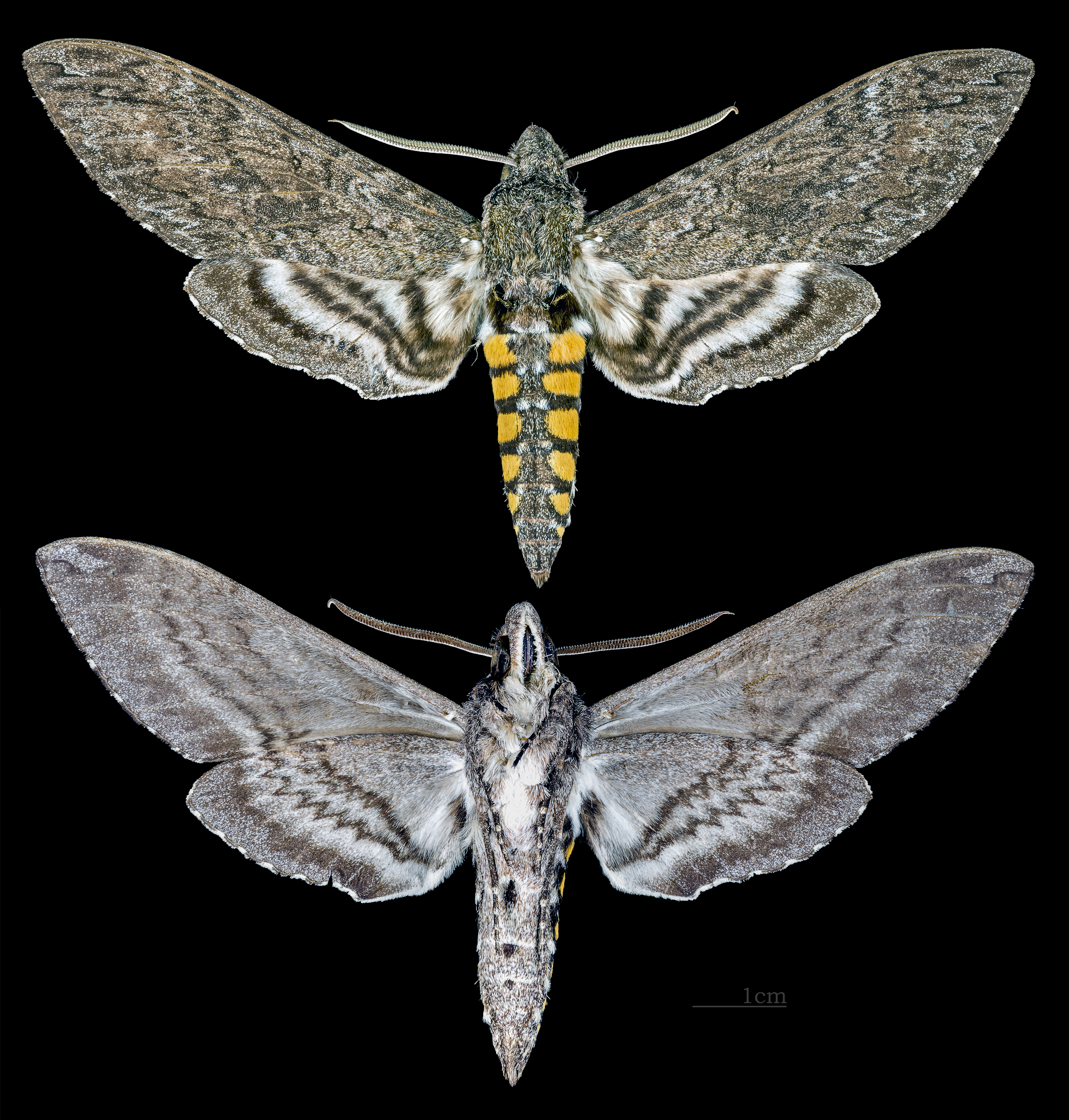
Manduca sexta

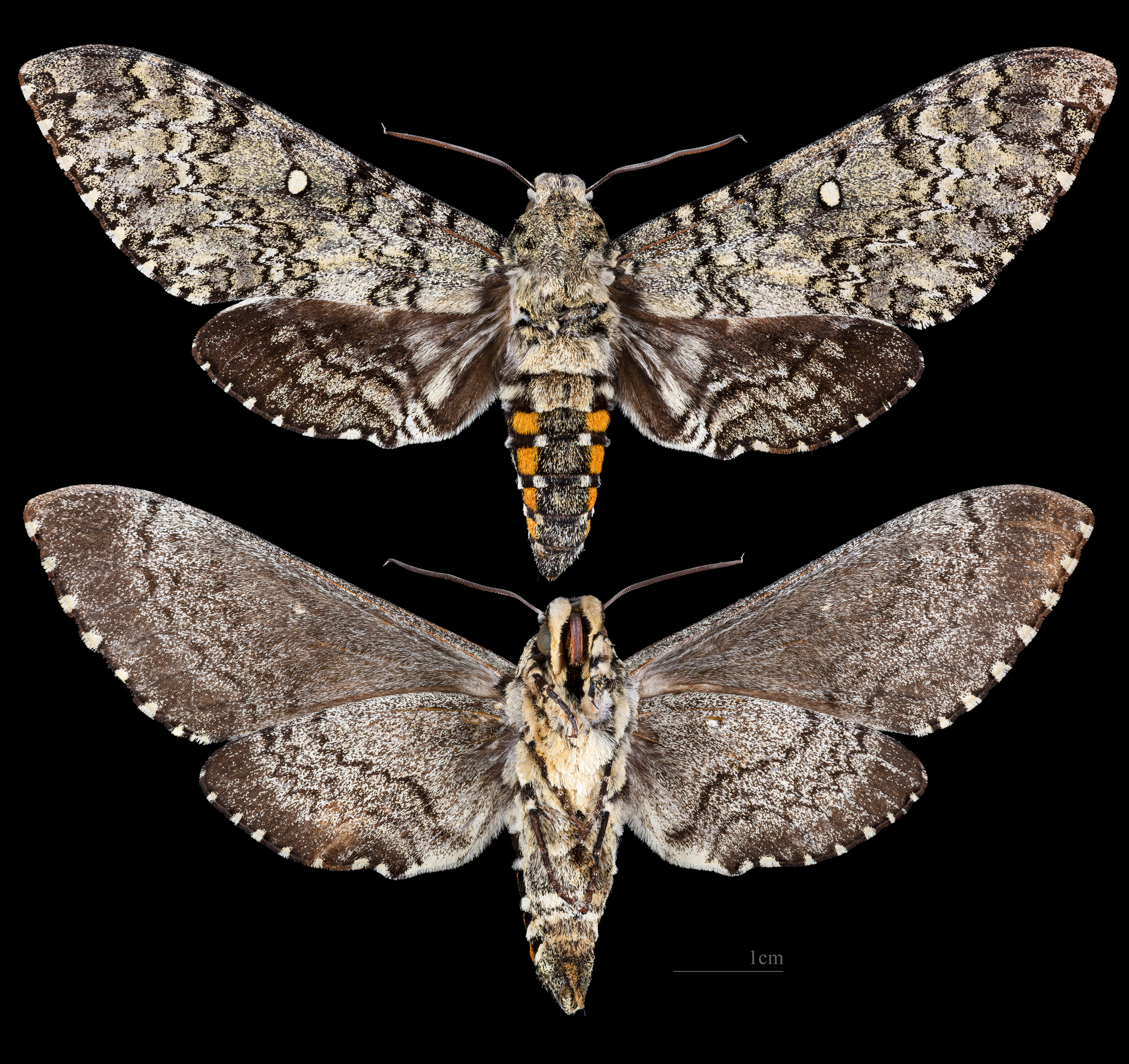
Manduca stuarti

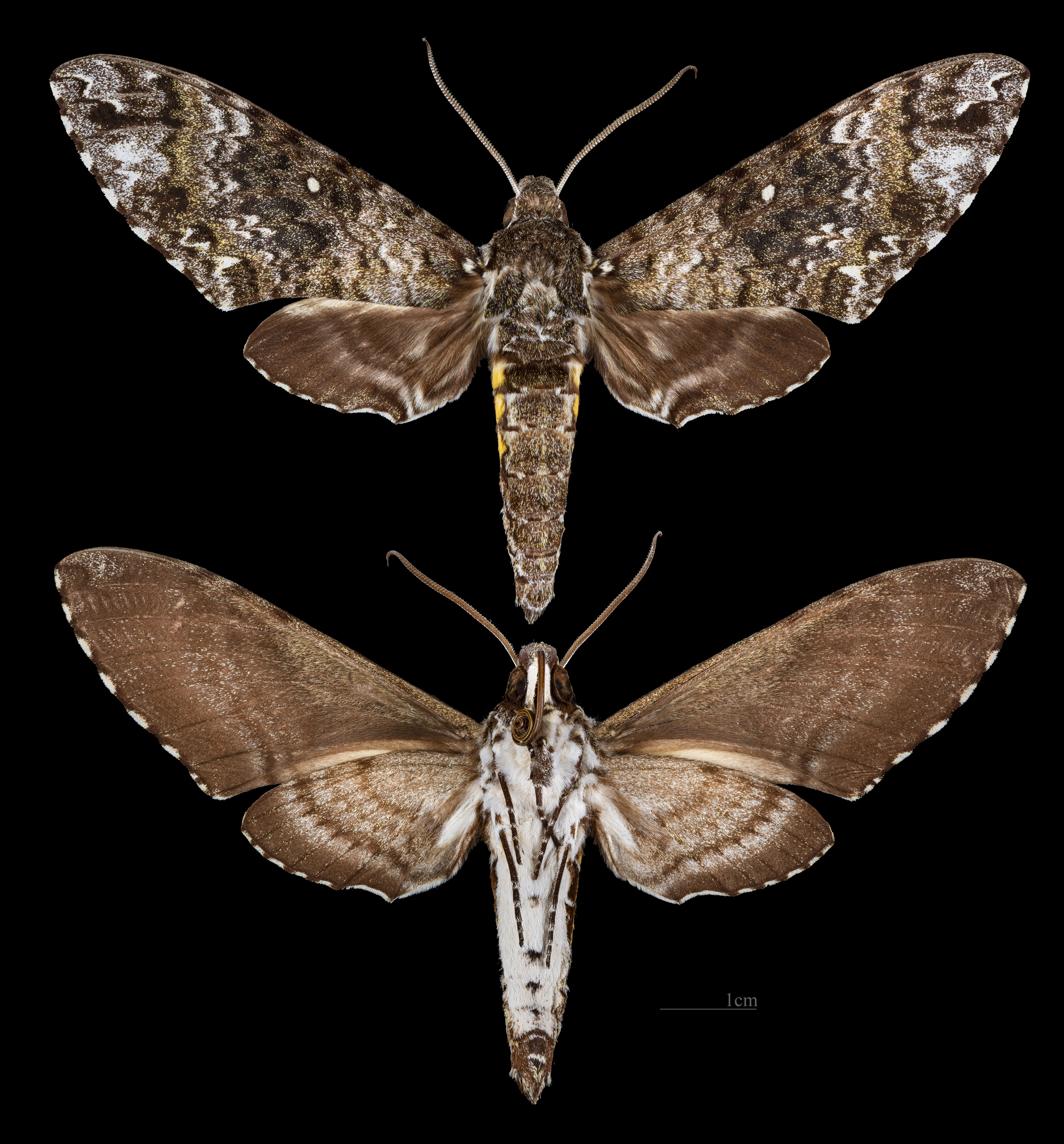
Manduca trimacula

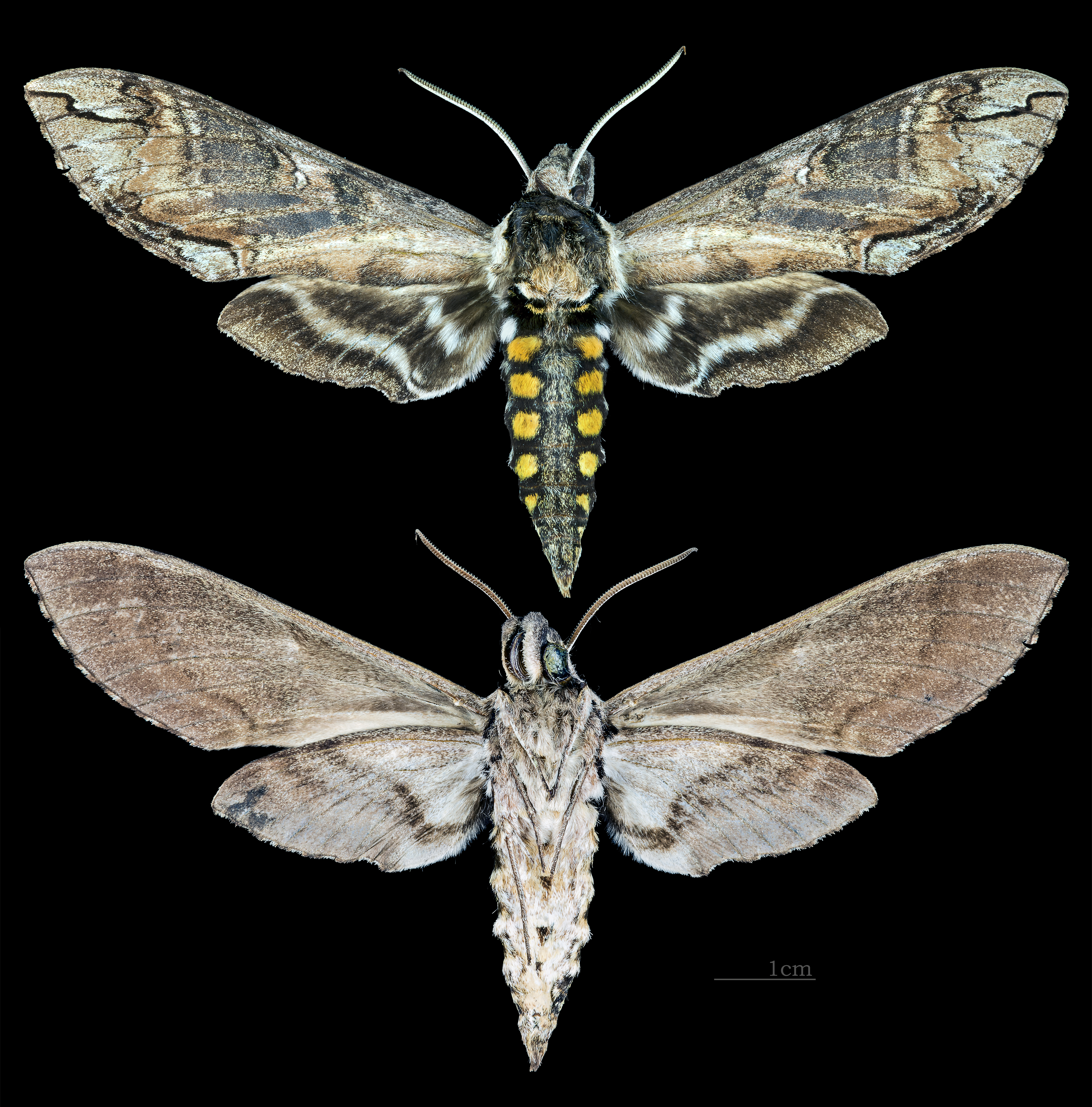
Manduca tucumana

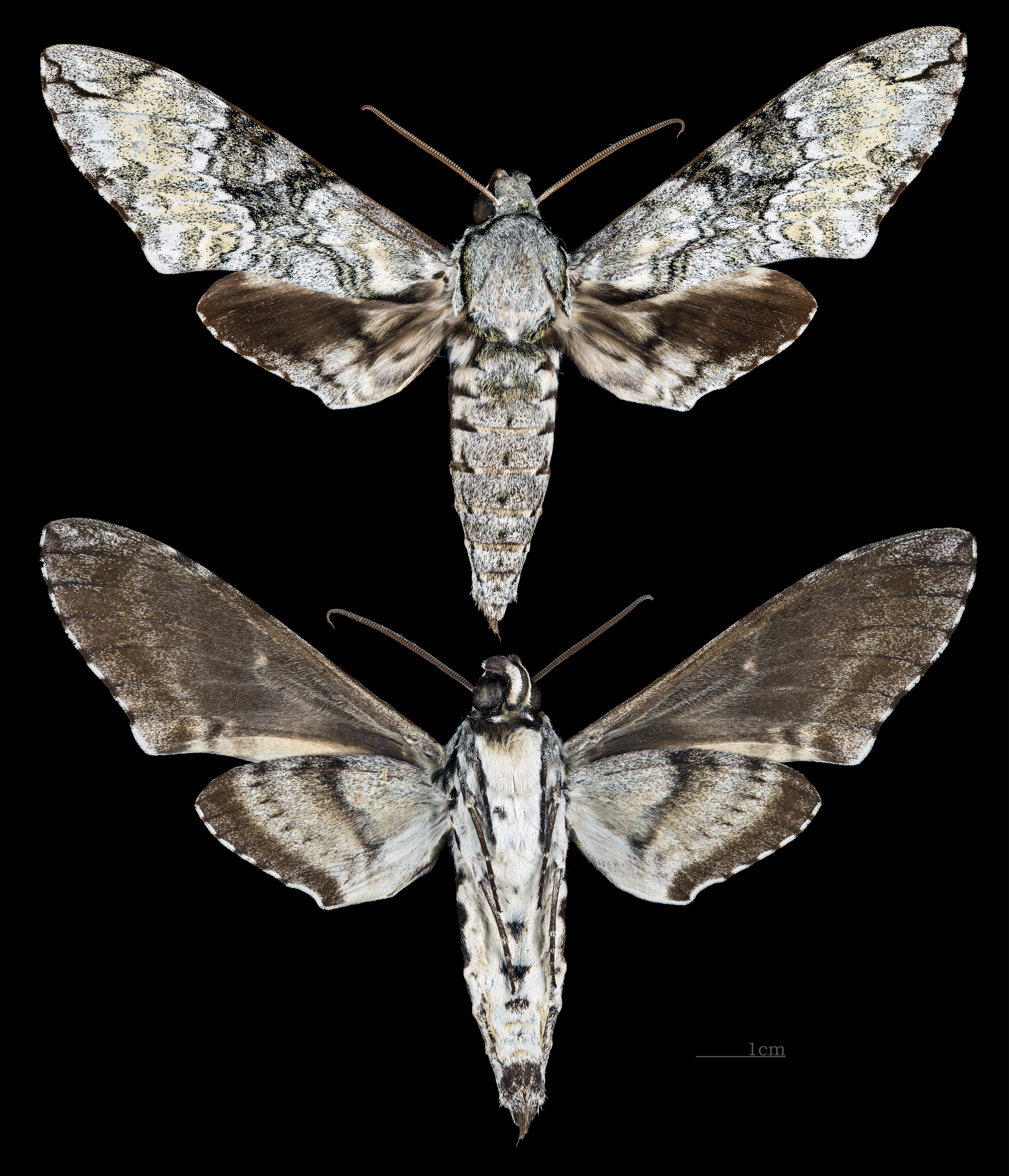
Manduca vestalis

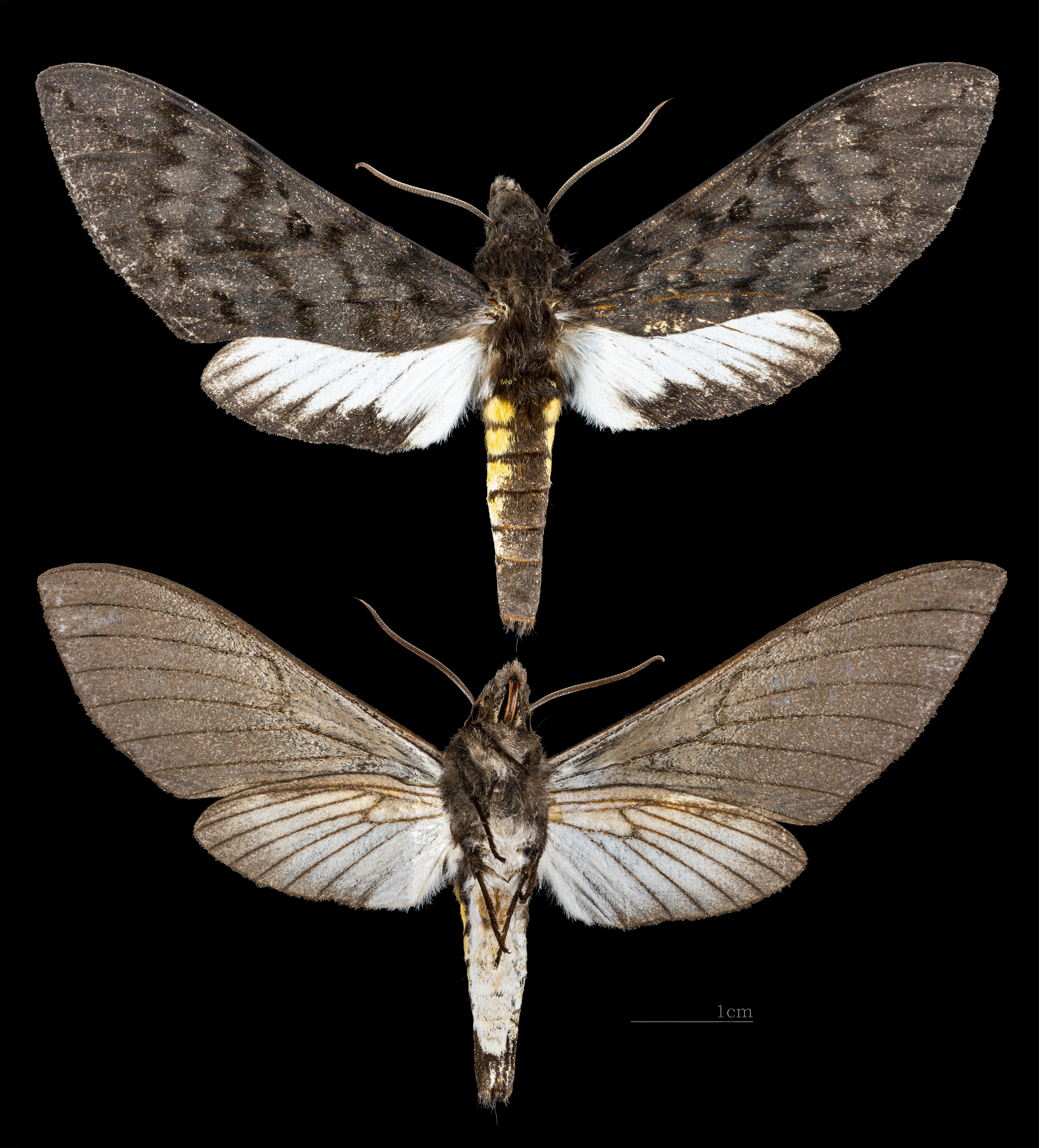
Manduca violaalba

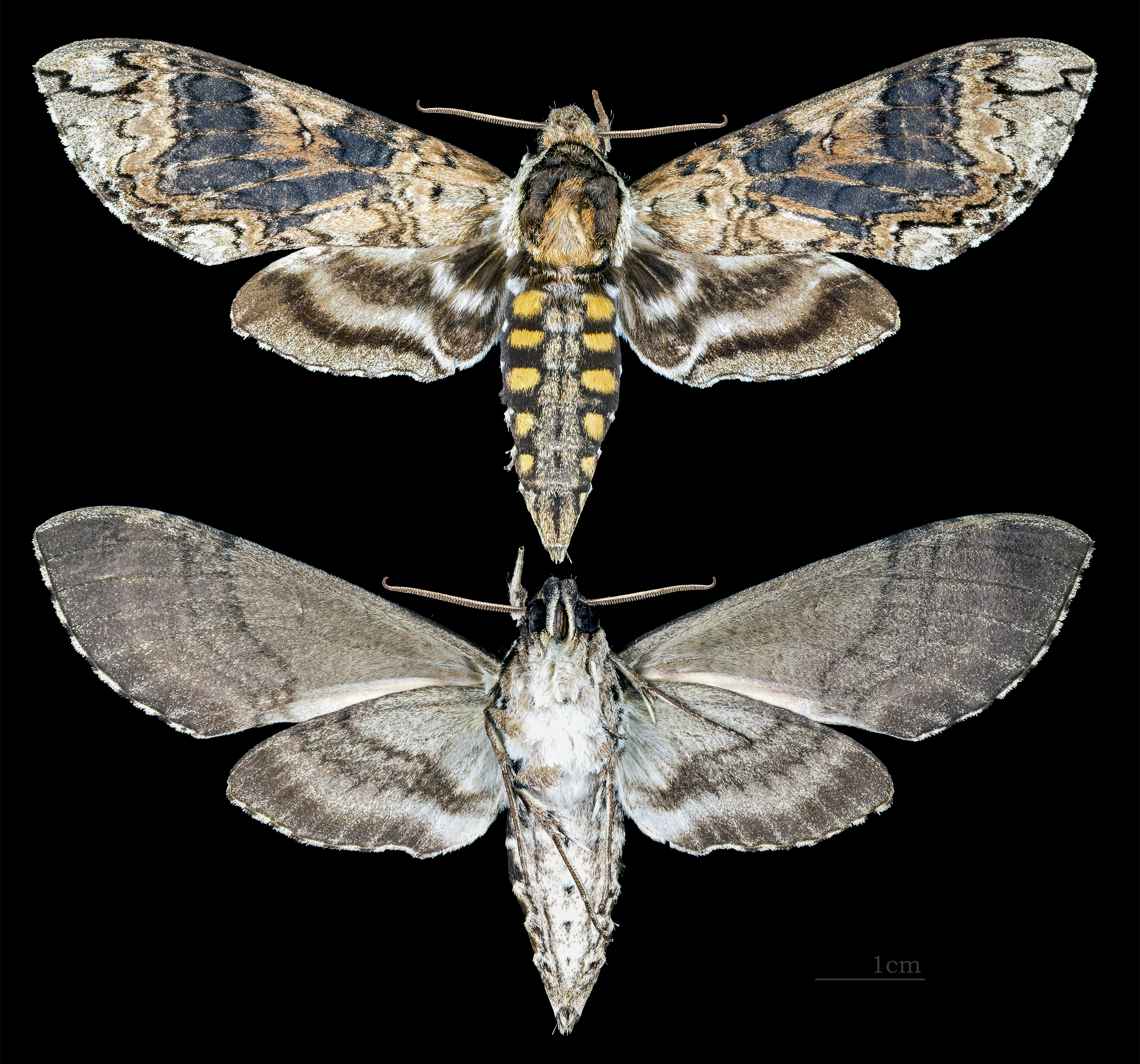
Manduca wellingi
