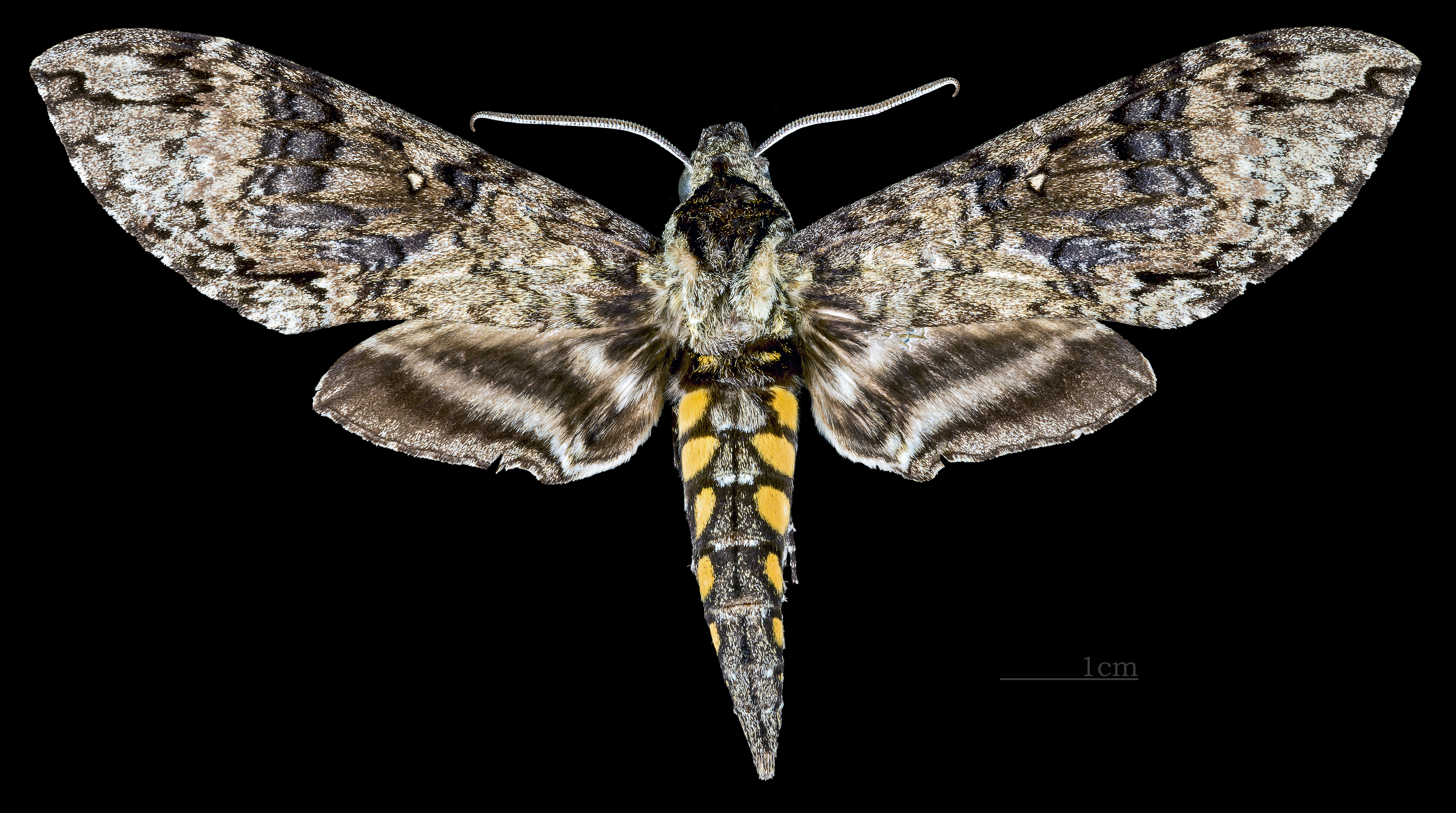
- Male, dorsal view
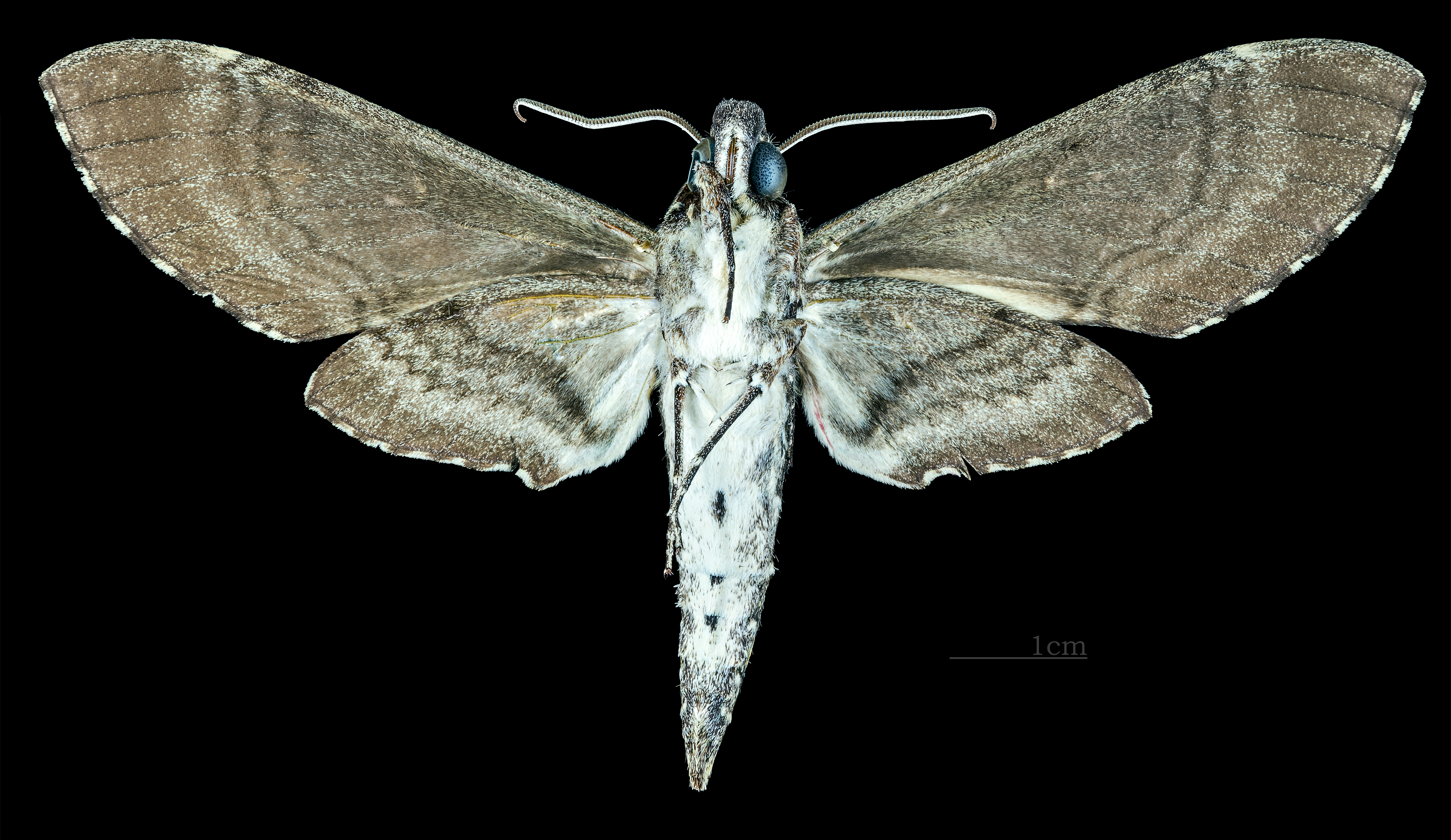
- Male, ventral view

Scientific classification
- Kingdom: Animalia
- Phylum: Arthropoda
- Class: Insecta
- Order: Lepidoptera
- Family: Sphingidae
- Genus: Manduca
- Species: M. clarki

Binomial name
- Manduca clarki (Rothschild & Jordan, 1916)

Synonyms
- Protoparce clarki Rothschild & Jordan, 1916

= Manduca clarki =

Species of moth

Manduca clarki is a moth of the family Sphingidae first described by Walter Rothschild and Karl Jordan in 1916. It is known from Brazil, Colombia, Ecuador, Peru and Bolivia.

The length of the forewings is 45–50 mm. It is similar in appearance to several other members of the genus Manduca, but a number of differences distinguish it from Manduca scutata, Manduca pellenia and Manduca lucetius, to which it most closely compares, particularly in its smaller size, the grey pale parts of the upperside of the thorax and wings and the less elongate forewing shape.

There are at least two generations per year with adults on wing from November/December to January and again in July.
