= Brugmansia × rubella =

Scientific classification
- Kingdom: Plantae
- Clade: Tracheophytes
- Clade: Angiosperms
- Clade: Eudicots
- Clade: Asterids
- Order: Solanales
- Family: Solanaceae
- Genus: Brugmansia
- Section: Brugmansia sect. Sphaerocarpum
- Species: B. × rubella

Binomial name
- Brugmansia × rubella (Saff.) Moldenke
- It is endemic to Ecuador

Synonyms
- Datura × rubella Saff.; Brugmansia × flava Herklotz ex U.Preissel & H.G.Preissel

Species of flowering plant

Brugmansia × rubella is a species of tree in the family Solanaceae endemic to Ecuador. It is a hybrid of Brugmansia arborea and Brugmansia sanguinea.

== Description ==
=== Vegetative characteristics ===
Brugmansia × rubella is a 2.4–3 m tall shrub or tree. The pubescent, ovate-lanceolate, acuminate, 10 cm long, and 4 cm wide leaves have an entire or repand margin.

=== Generative characteristics ===
The pedicel is pubescent. The pubescent, spathe-like, 10 cm long calyx is split on one side and ends in a long, acuminate, taillike apex. The red, 13–14 cm long, pubescent, not widely flared corolla bears 5 slender, 15 mm long, taillike teeth. The corolla nervation bears minute hairs. The 10.5 cm long stamens with basally pubescent filaments bear free, light grayish orange, linear, 2 cm long anthers. The 11–11.5 cm long pistil, which extends slightly beyond the stamens, bears a clavate, thick, obtuse stigma. The broadly oval, 7 cm long, and 5 cm wide fruit bears a small apical protrusion.

== Taxonomy ==
It was first described as Datura rubella Saff. by William Edwin Safford in 1921. It was moved to the genus Brugmansia Pers. as Brugmansia rubella (Saff.) Moldenke by Harold Norman Moldenke in 1943. It is placed in the section Brugmansia sect. Sphaerocarpum. The type specimen was collected by J. N. Rose in September 1918 near Cuenca, Ecuador at an elevation of 2500 m above sea level.

== Distribution and habitat ==
It is endemic to Ecuador.
