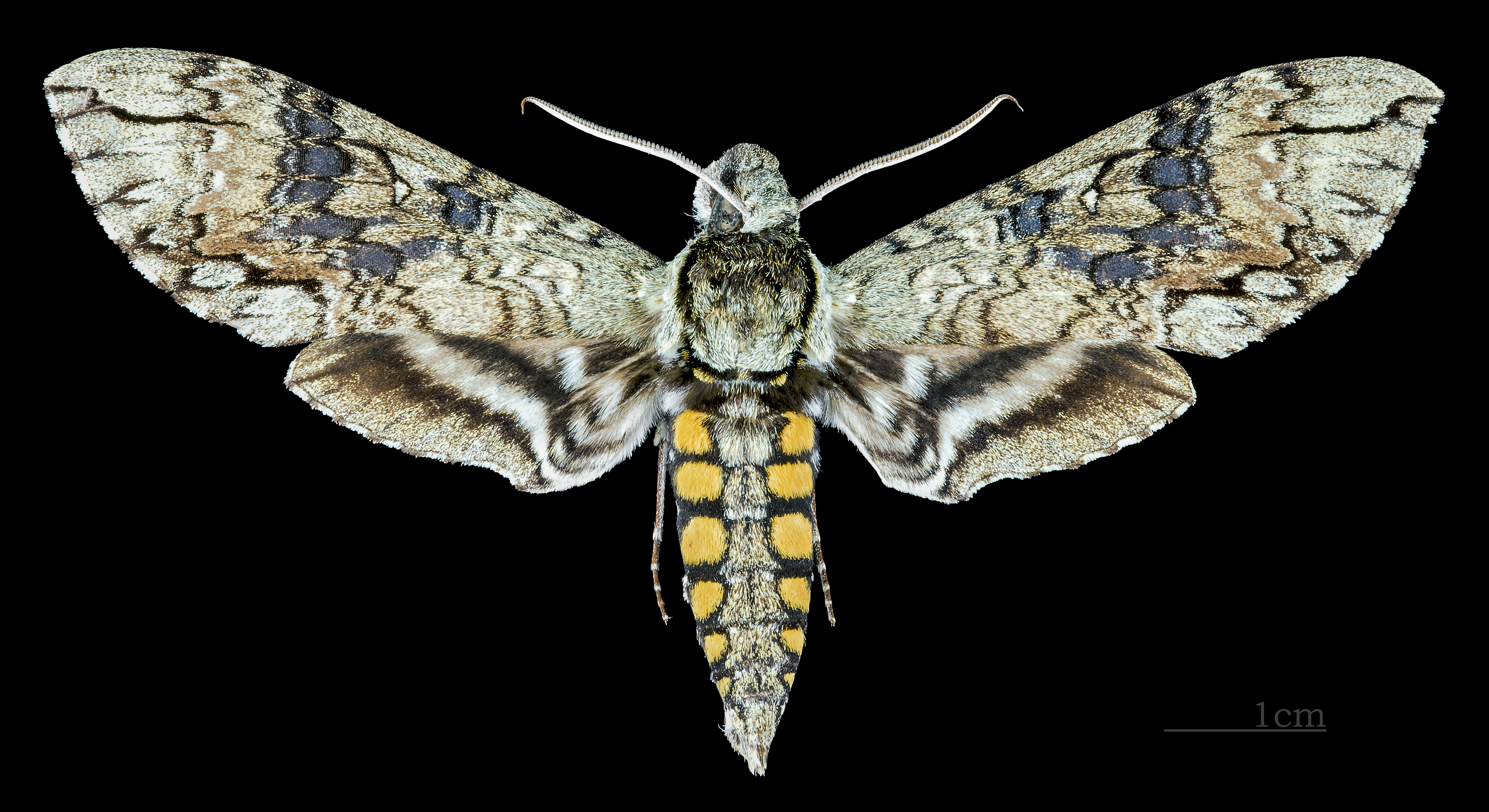
- Manduca boliviana dorsal
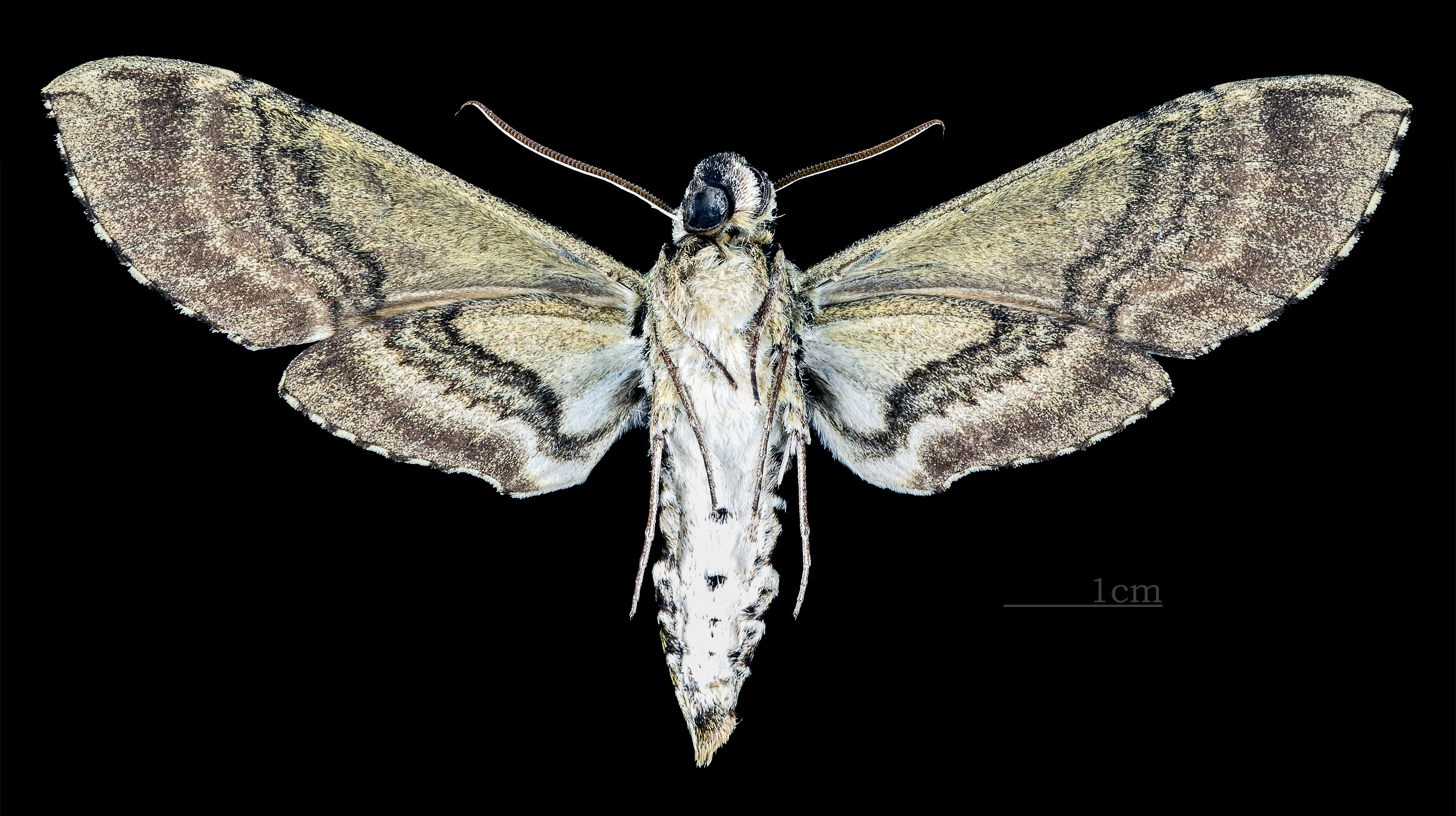
- Manduca boliviana ventral

Scientific classification
- Kingdom: Animalia
- Phylum: Arthropoda
- Class: Insecta
- Order: Lepidoptera
- Family: Sphingidae
- Genus: Manduca
- Species: M. boliviana

Binomial name
- Manduca boliviana (B.P. Clark, 1923)

Synonyms
- Protoparce boliviana Clark, 1923

= Manduca boliviana =

Species of moth

Manduca boliviana is a moth of the family Sphingidae. It is known from Bolivia.

The length of the forewings is about 44 mm. It is similar to Manduca scutata and Manduca brasiliensis, but smaller, much lighter coloured and the forewings are shorter and more rounded than the latter. The forewing upperside ground colour is light grey and the forewing underside is light, with three strongly marked postmedian bands and a broad marginal band. The hindwing upperside has a white submarginal band and the hindwing underside postmedian band is narrower and more marked than in Manduca scutata and Manduca brasiliensis.
