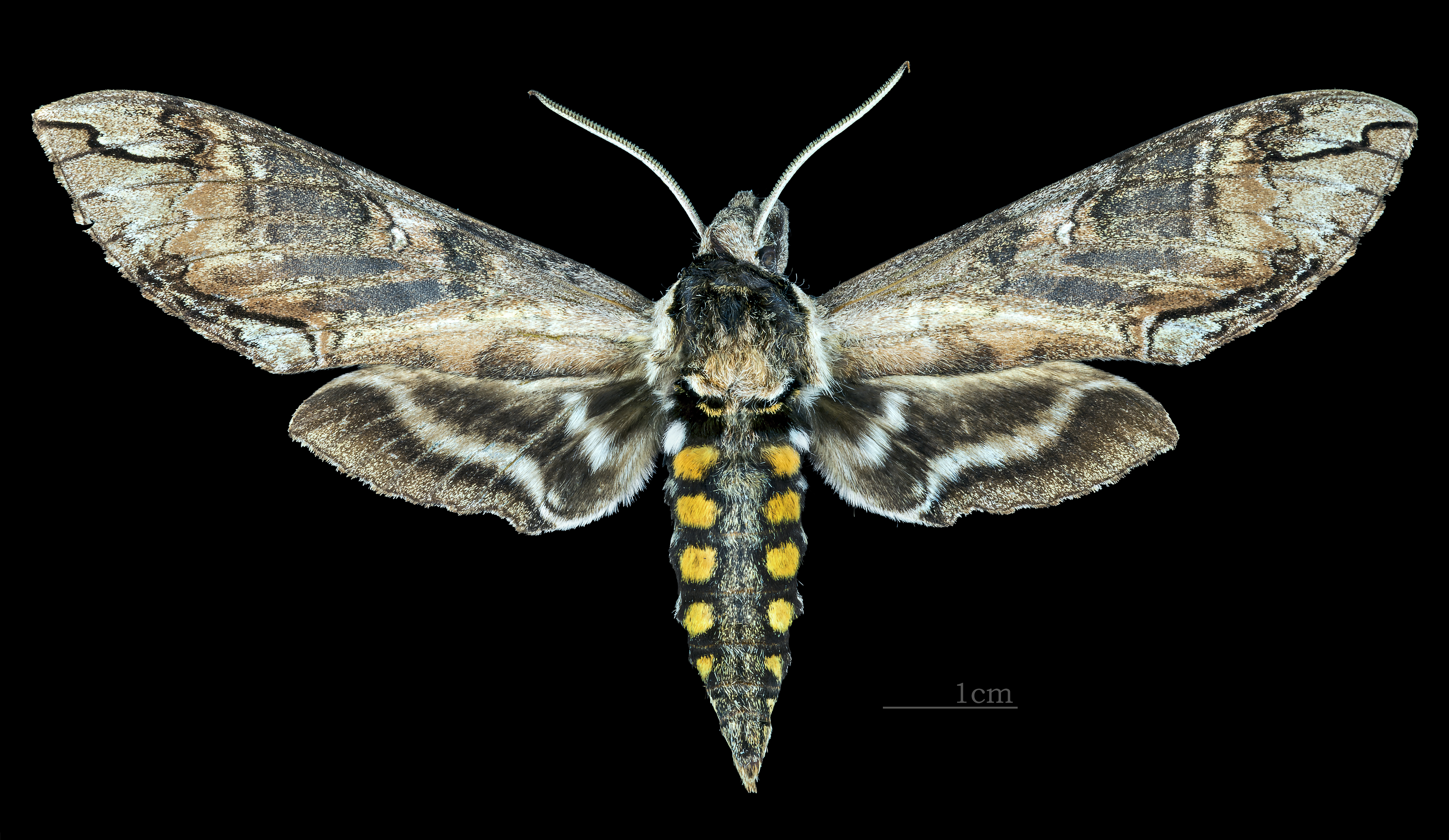
- Manduca tucumana dorsal
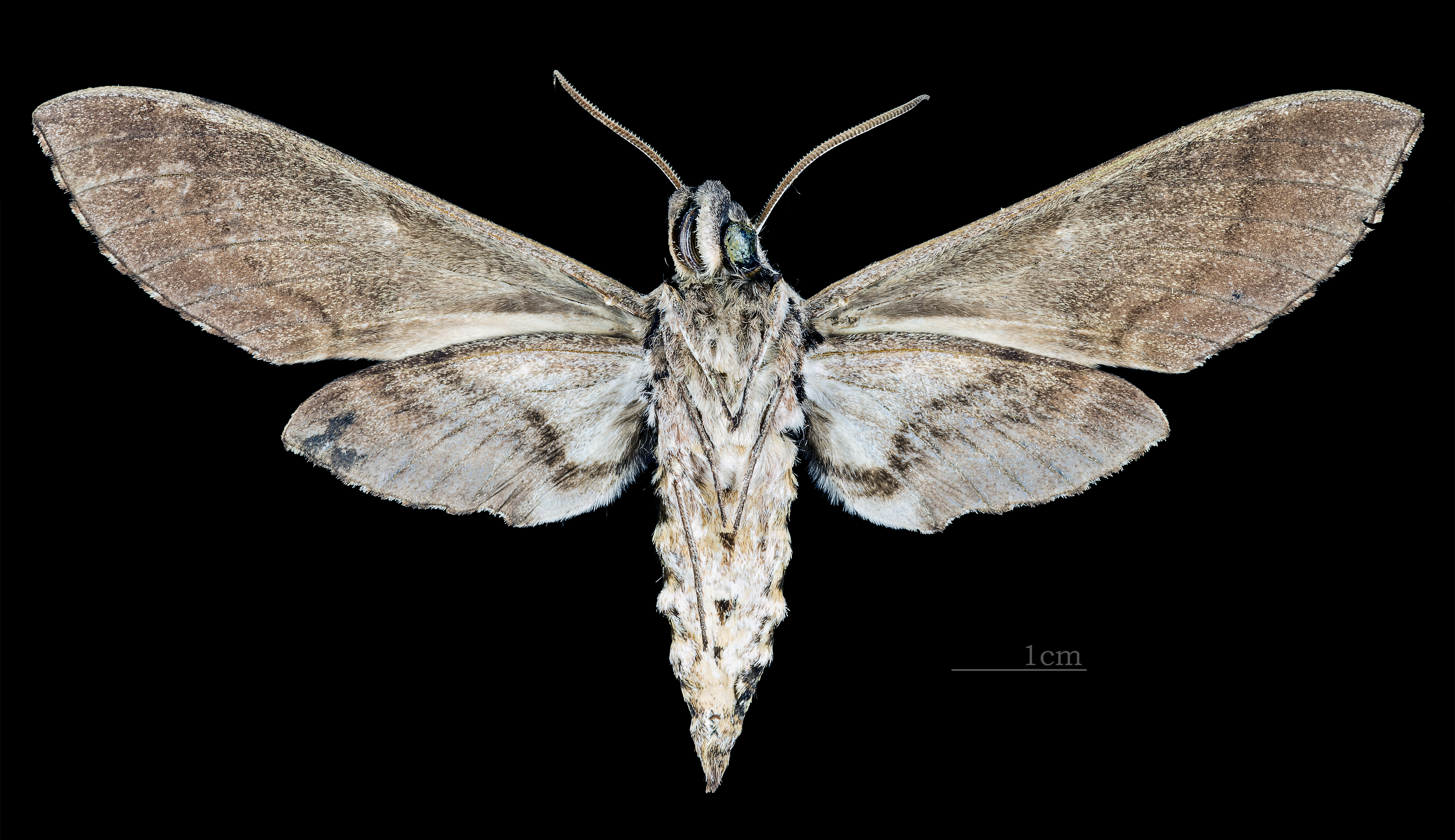
- Manduca tucumana ventral

Scientific classification
- Kingdom: Animalia
- Phylum: Arthropoda
- Class: Insecta
- Order: Lepidoptera
- Family: Sphingidae
- Genus: Manduca
- Species: M. tucumana

Binomial name
- Manduca tucumana (Rothschild & Jordan, 1903)

Synonyms
- Protoparce tucumana Rothschild & Jordan, 1903

= Manduca tucumana =

Species of moth

Manduca tucumana is a moth of the family Sphingidae.

== Distribution ==
It is known from Argentina and Bolivia.

== Description ==
The wingspan is about 108 mm. It is similar in appearance to several other members of the genus Manduca, but a number of differences distinguish it from Manduca pellenia and Manduca scutata, to which it most closely compares, particularly in its distinctly paler head, thorax and forewing and the almost white discal spot, pale lines and fringe on the forewing upperside. The abdomen underside is somewhat buffish.

== Biology ==
Adults have been recorded in March and from November to December in Argentina indicating at least two generations.
