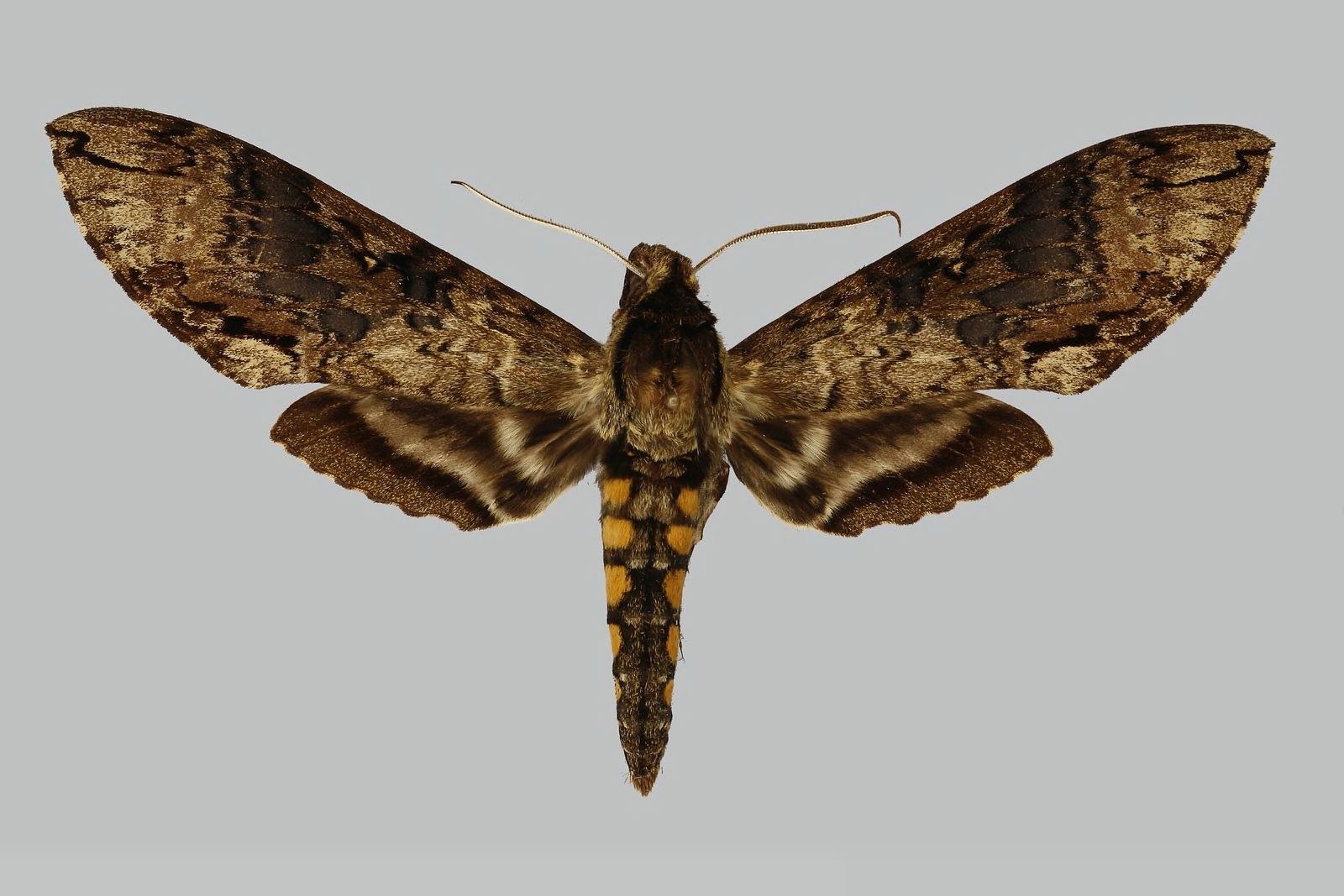
- Male

Scientific classification
- Kingdom: Animalia
- Phylum: Arthropoda
- Class: Insecta
- Order: Lepidoptera
- Family: Sphingidae
- Genus: Manduca
- Species: M. janira

Binomial name
- Manduca janira (Jordan, 1911)

Synonyms
- Protoparce janira Jordan, 1911

= Manduca janira =

Species of moth

Manduca janira is a moth of the family Sphingidae. It can be found in south-eastern Brazil.

It is similar in appearance to several other members of the genus Manduca, but a number of differences distinguish it from Manduca brasiliensis, to which it most closely compares, particularly in the more prominently variegated basal and apical areas of the wings and the hindwing upperside with grey bands tinted with yellow.
