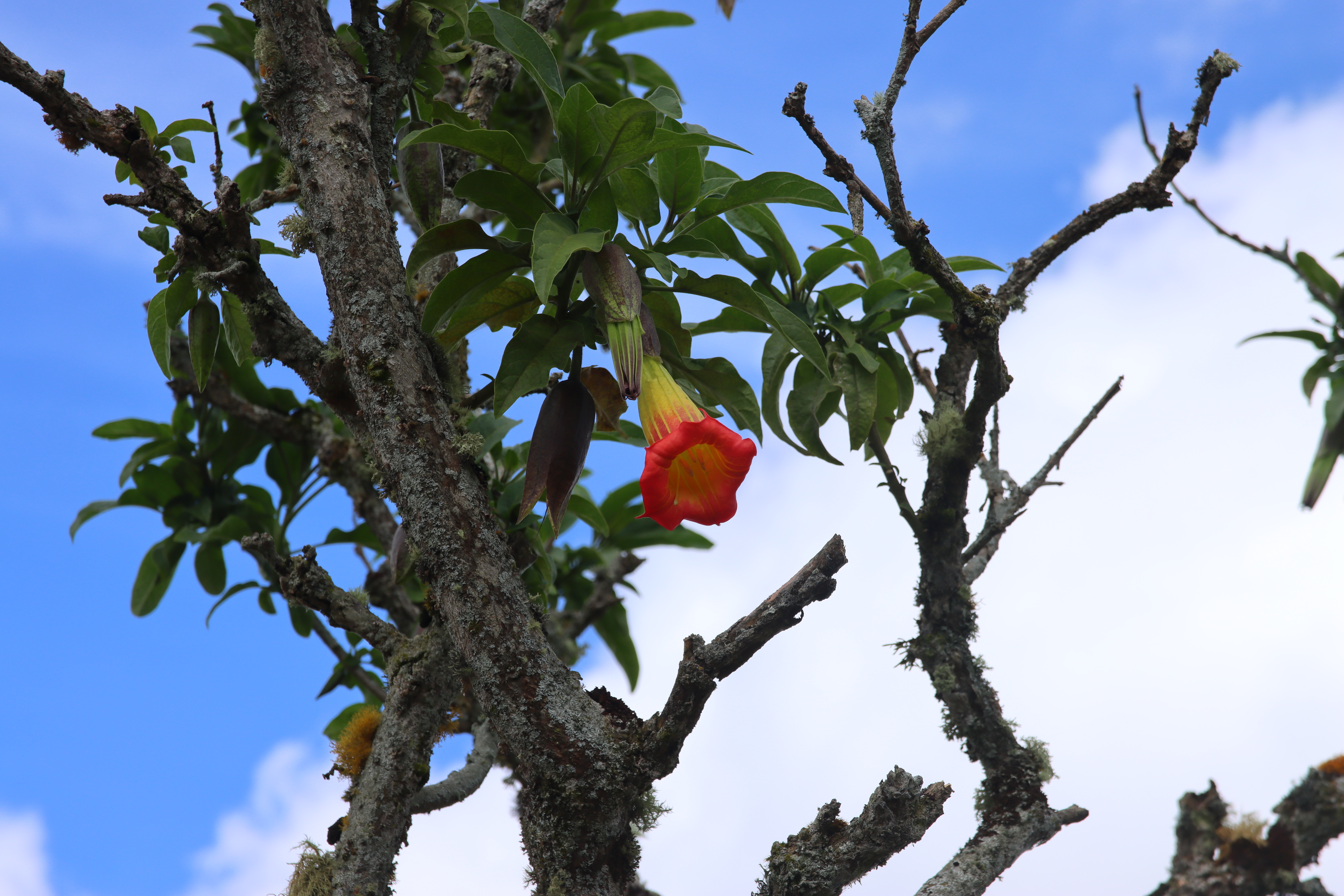
- Brugmansia sanguinea in flower

Scientific classification
- Kingdom: Plantae
- Clade: Tracheophytes
- Clade: Angiosperms
- Clade: Eudicots
- Clade: Asterids
- Order: Solanales
- Family: Solanaceae
- Genus: Brugmansia
- Section: Brugmansia sect. Sphaerocarpum; J.M.H.Shaw

Type species
- Brugmansia arborea (L.) Sweet

Species
- See here.

= Brugmansia sect. Sphaerocarpum =

Section of the genus Brugmansia in the family Solanaceae

Brugmansia sect. Sphaerocarpum is a section within the genus Brugmansia in the family Solanaceae. It is sometimes referred to as the "Cold Group" Brugmansia.

== Description ==
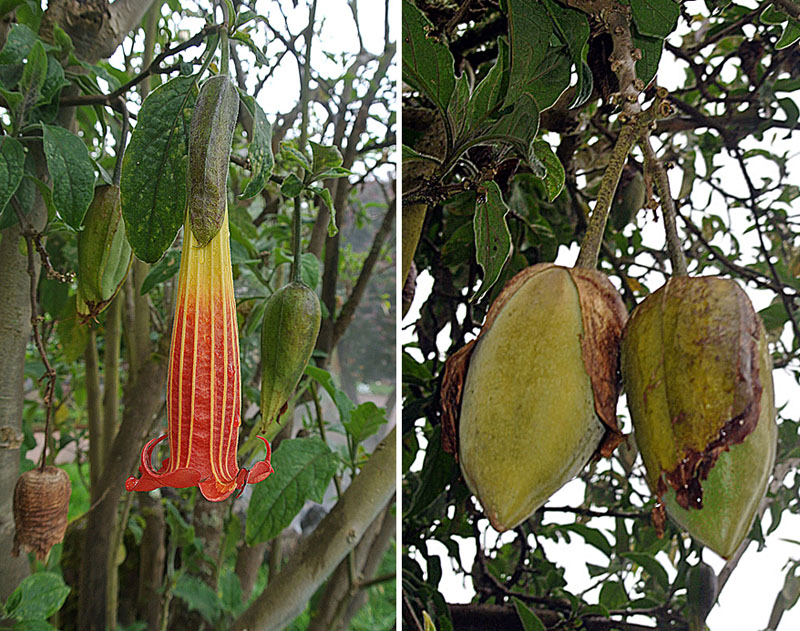
Flower and fruits of Brugmansia sanguinea

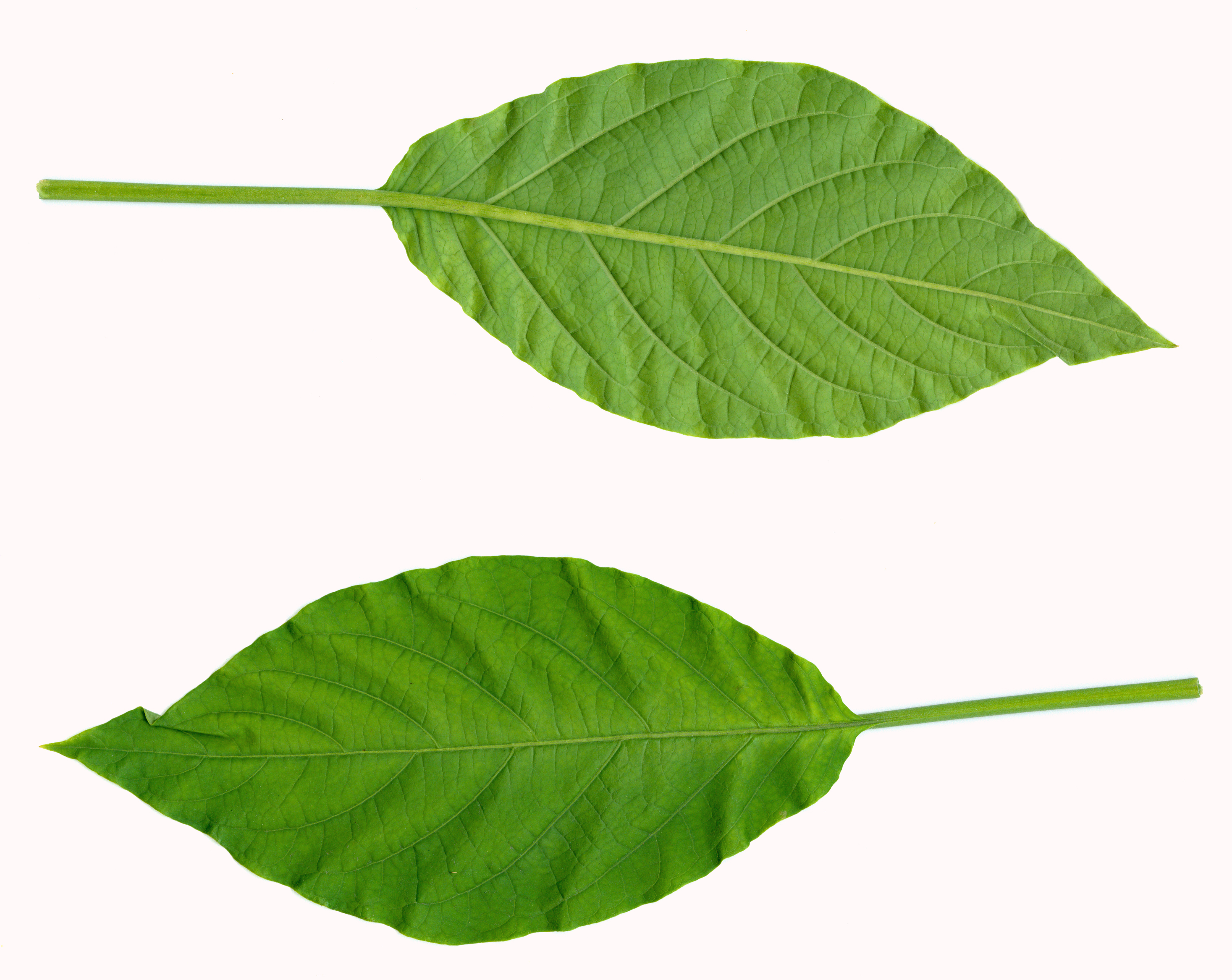
Brugmansia arborea foliage

The flowers are fragrant or inodorous. The fruit is rounded.

== Taxonomy ==
It was described by Julian Mark Hugh Shaw in 1999 with Brugmansia arborea (L.) Sweet as the type species.

=== Species ===
- Brugmansia arborea (L.) Sweet
- Brugmansia × rubella (Saff.) Moldenke
- Brugmansia sanguinea (Ruiz & Pav.) D.Don
- Brugmansia vulcanicola (A.S.Barclay) R.E.Schult.

=== Etymology ===
The section name Sphaerocarpum refers to the rounded form of the fruit.

== Distribution and habitat ==
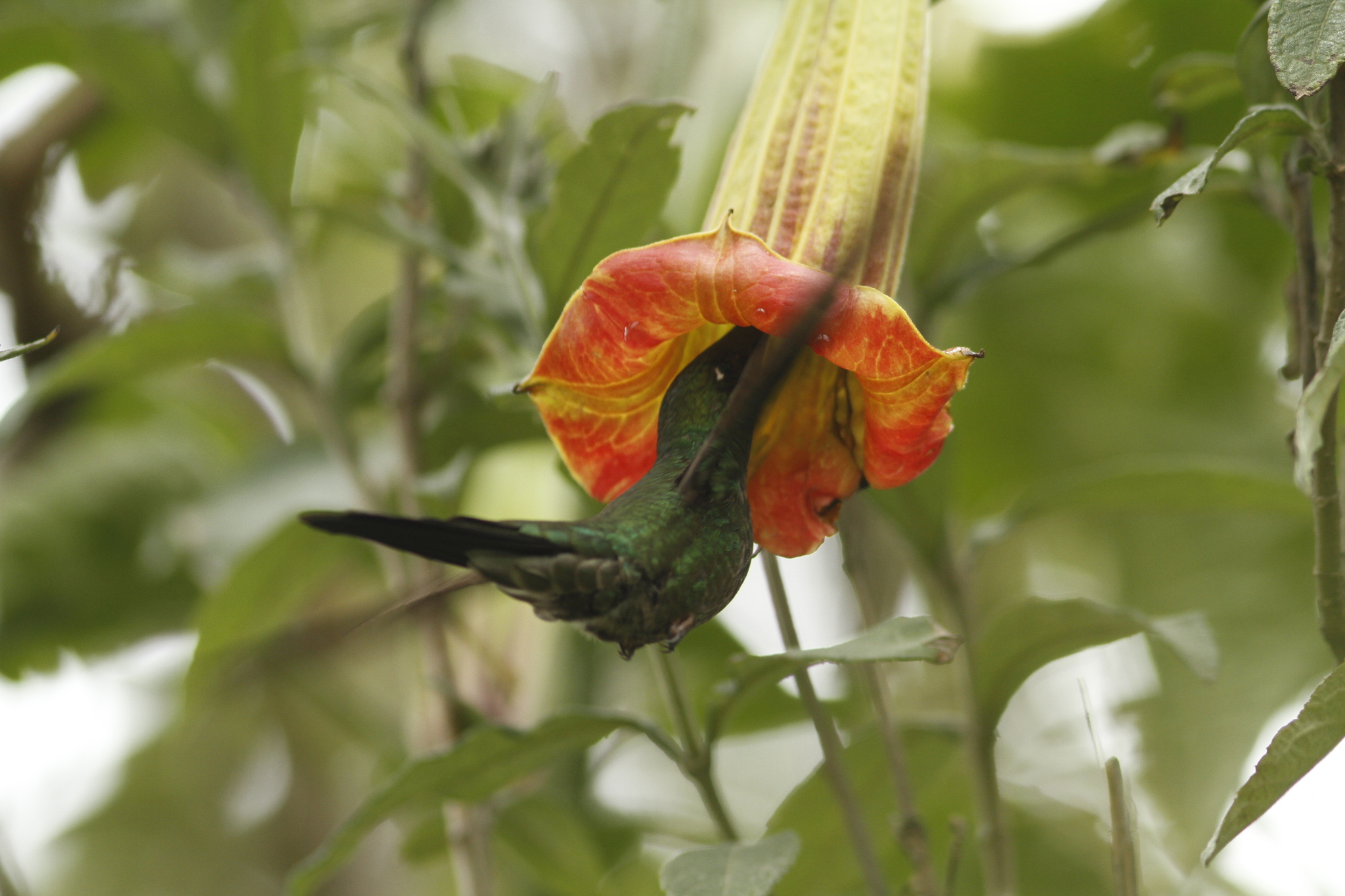
An Ensifera ensifera hummingbird visiting a Brugmansia sanguinea flower in Quito, Ecuador

The species of Brugmansia sect. Sphaerocarpum are native to the Andes mountain range and occur at higher elevations than species of the section Brugmansia sect. Brugmansia.

== Cultivation ==
Species of the section Brugmansia sect. Sphaerocarpum are cultivated in humid conditions with cool temperatures of under 18°C during the day and at 10°C at night. The plants are damaged if the temperatures exceed 25°C. Hybridisation with species of section Brugmansia sect. Brugmansia is practically impossible.
