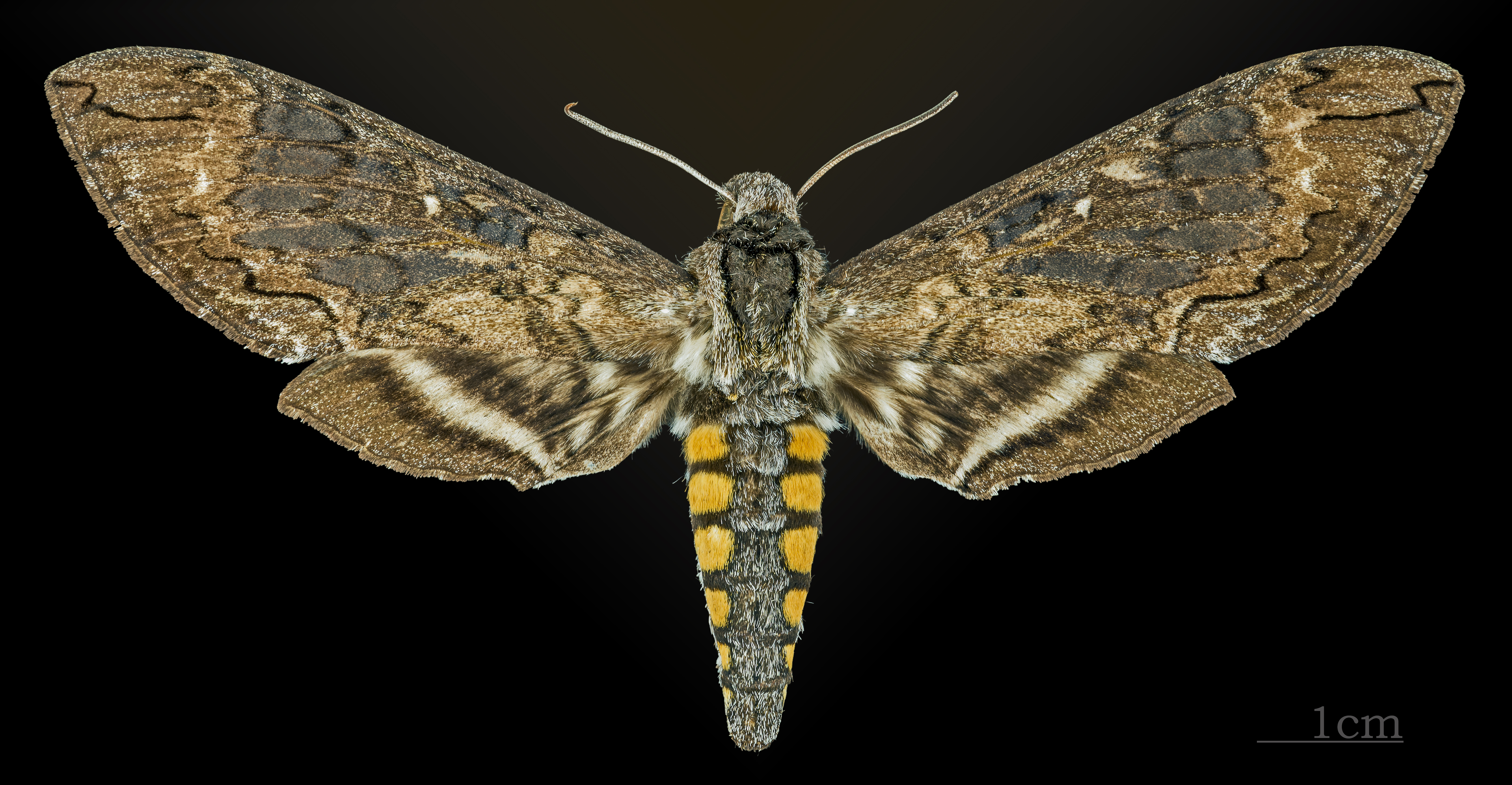
- Manduca lucetius Dorsal
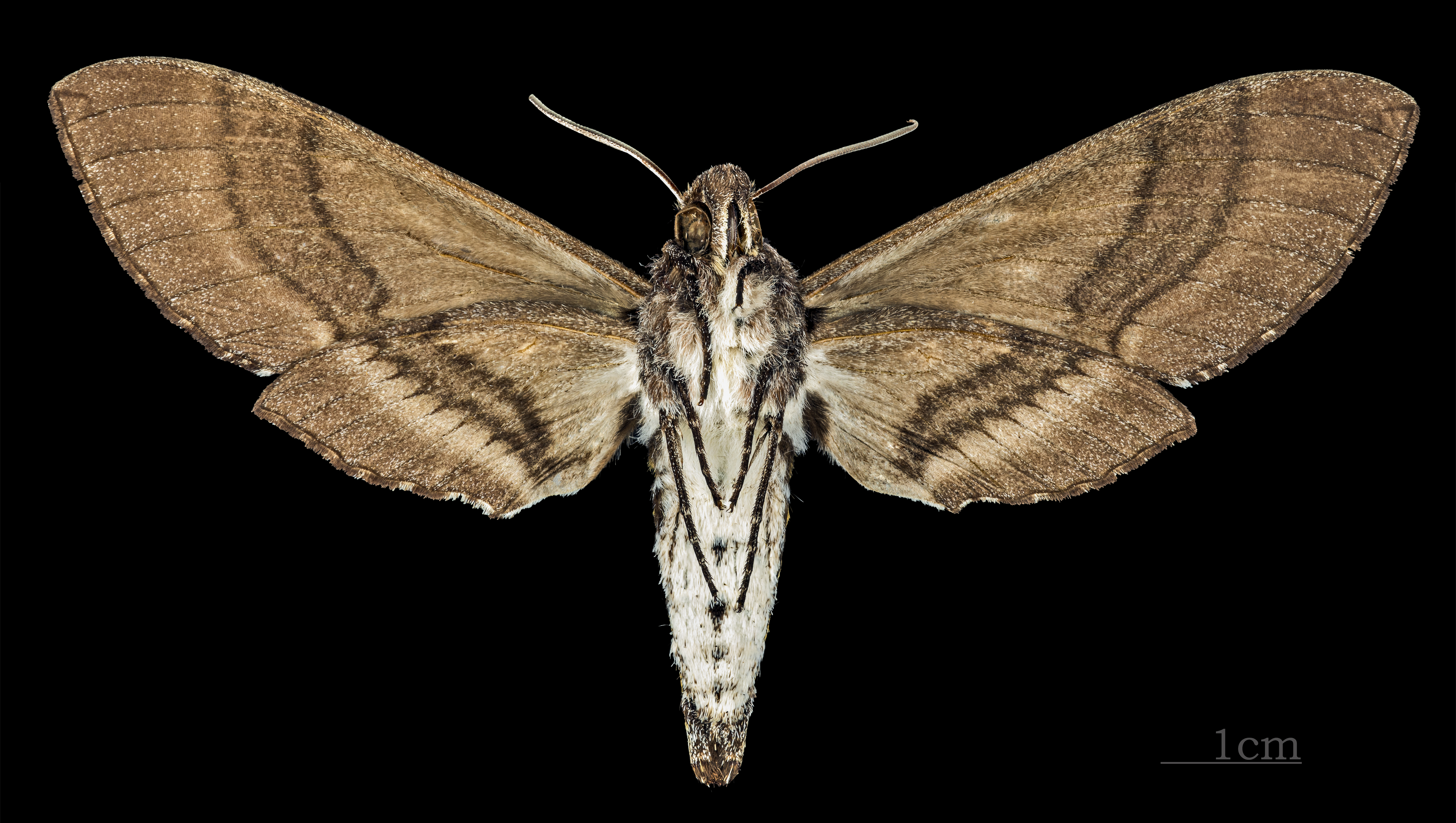
- Manduca lucetius Ventral

Scientific classification
- Kingdom: Animalia
- Phylum: Arthropoda
- Clade: Pancrustacea
- Class: Insecta
- Order: Lepidoptera
- Family: Sphingidae
- Genus: Manduca
- Species: M. lucetius

Binomial name
- Manduca lucetius (Cramer, 1780)

Synonyms
- Sphinx lucetius Cramer, 1780; Protoparce perplexa Rothschild & Jordan, 1910

= Manduca lucetius =

Species of moth

Manduca lucetius is a moth of the family Sphingidae. It is known from Suriname, Brazil, Ecuador, Peru, Bolivia and Paraguay.

The larvae feed on Lycopersicon species (including Lycopersicon esculentum), Brugmansia arborea, Brunfelsia uniflora, Capsicum annuum and Solanum sisymbriifolium.
