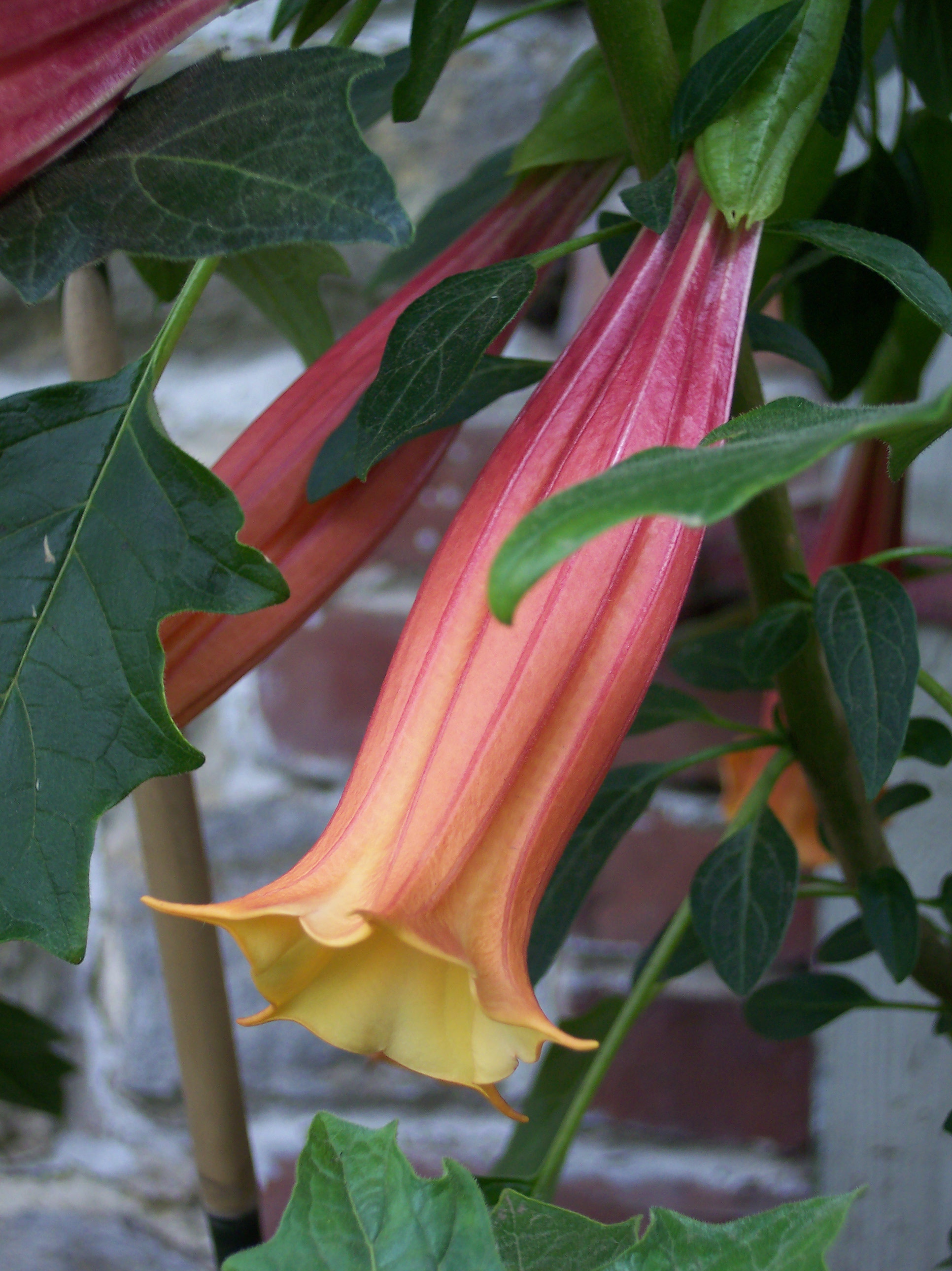

Conservation status
- Extinct in the Wild (IUCN 3.1)

Scientific classification
- Kingdom: Plantae
- Clade: Tracheophytes
- Clade: Angiosperms
- Clade: Eudicots
- Clade: Asterids
- Order: Solanales
- Family: Solanaceae
- Genus: Brugmansia
- Section: Brugmansia sect. Sphaerocarpum
- Species: B. vulcanicola

Binomial name
- Brugmansia vulcanicola (A.S.Barclay) R.E.Schult.
- It is native to southwestern Colombia and south-central Ecuador

Synonyms
- Brugmansia sanguinea subsp. vulcanicola (A.S.Barclay) Govaerts; Datura vulcanicola A.S.Barclay; Datura sanguinea var. flava Dunal

= Brugmansia vulcanicola =

Species of flowering plant

Brugmansia vulcanicola is a shrub or tree in the family Solanaceae native to Colombia and Ecuador.

== Description ==
=== Vegetative characteristics ===
Brugmansia vulcanicola is a 3–4 m tall shrub or small tree with alternate, petiolate, ovate to ovate-elliptic, 20 cm long, and 10 cm wide leaves with an acute apex. The petiole is up to 10 cm long. The wood is very hard.

=== Generative characteristics ===
The axillary, pedicellate, red, yellow, or pink, pendent, tubular / trumpet-shaped flowers belong to the smallest of all Brugmansia at 15 to 22 cm (6 to 9 in). They also have the shortest corolla peaks at 0.5 to 1.5 cm (0.20 to 0.59 in). The non-persistent calyx is dentate. The obovate, warty, bisulcate capsule fruit bears smooth, shiny, reniform, 7 mm long, and 5 mm wide seeds.

== Taxonomy ==
It was first described as Datura vulcanicola A.S.Barclay by Arthur Stewart Barclay in 1959. It was placed in the genus Brugmansia Pers. as Brugmansia vulcanicola (A.S.Barclay) R.E.Schult. by Richard Evans Schultes in 1977.

== Distribution and habitat ==
Brugmansia vulcanicola was endemic to the Andes mountains of Colombia and Ecuador at elevations of 2,800 to 3,300 m (9,200 to 10,800 ft) but it is now extinct in the wild.

== Toxicity ==
All parts of Brugmansia vulcanicola are poisonous, containing tropane alkaloids.

== Conservation ==
It is Extinct in the Wild and no wild populations of Brugmansia vulcanicola were ever recorded. It is threatened by hybridisation with Brugmansia sanguinea and in some locations the collected Brugmansia vulcanicola seeds only give rise to hybridised seedlings. It is susceptible to the Colombian Datura virus (CDV) in the family Potyviridae but infected plants are rare. Populations have been destroyed by bee-keepers, fearing that the toxic Brugmansia vulcanicola could negatively affect the local honey production. Brugmansia vulcanicola is cultivated in several ex-situ collections in botanical gardens.

== Uses ==
It was used as an hallucinogenic narcotic.
