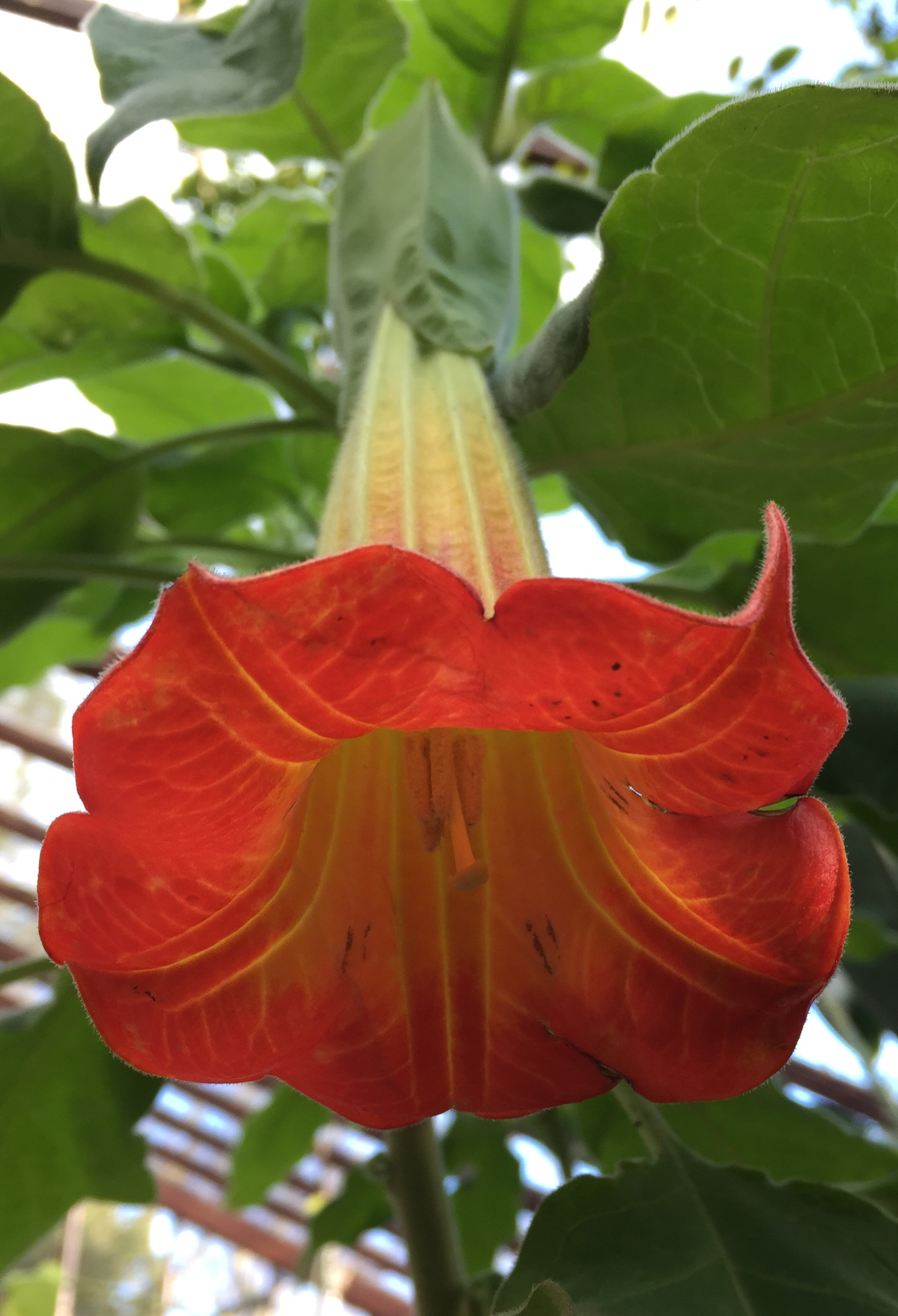

Conservation status
- Extinct in the Wild (IUCN 3.1)

Scientific classification
- Kingdom: Plantae
- Clade: Tracheophytes
- Clade: Angiosperms
- Clade: Eudicots
- Clade: Asterids
- Order: Solanales
- Family: Solanaceae
- Genus: Brugmansia
- Section: Brugmansia sect. Sphaerocarpum
- Species: B. sanguinea

Binomial name
- Brugmansia sanguinea (Ruiz & Pav.) D.Don

Synonyms
- Brugmansia bicolor Pers.; Datura rubra Pépin; Datura sanguinea Ruiz & Pav.; Brugmansia aurea J.Harrison; Brugmansia lutea Berl.; Brugmansia sanguinea var. glabra Marnock; Datura rosei Saff.; Datura sanguinea f. coccinea Voss; Elisia mutabilis Milano

= Brugmansia sanguinea =

Species of plant

Brugmansia sanguinea, the red angel's trumpet, is a species of South American flowering shrub or small tree belonging to the genus Brugmansia in tribe Datureae of subfamily Solanoideae of the nightshade family Solanaceae. It has been cultivated and used as an entheogen for shamanic purposes by the South American Natives for centuries - possibly even millennia.

== Description ==
Brugmansia sanguinea is a small tree reaching up to 10 m (33 ft) in height. The pendent, tubular/trumpet-shaped flowers come in shades of brilliant red, yellow, orange and green.

== Distribution ==
B. sanguinea is endemic to the Andes mountains from Colombia to northern Chile at elevations from 2,000 to 3,000 m (6,600 to 9,800 ft).

== Toxicity ==
All parts of Brugmansia sanguinea are poisonous. Different parts of the plant contain tropane alkaloids in varying proportions. Alkaloid content in the flowers is mainly atropine with only traces of scopolamine (hyoscine). The seeds of B. sanguinea contain approximately 0.17% alkaloids by mass, of which 78% are scopolomine.

== Gallery ==
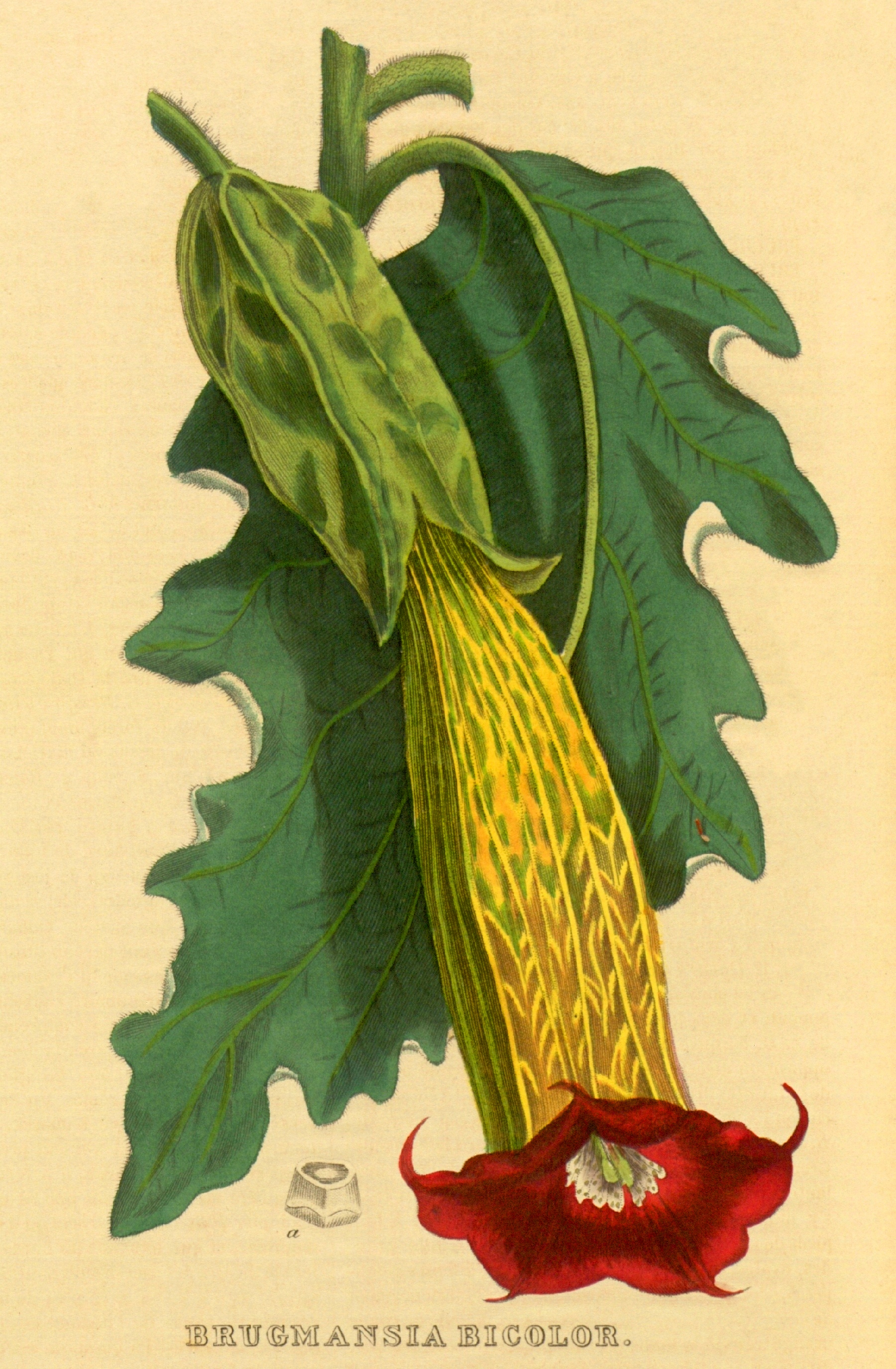
1853 illustration

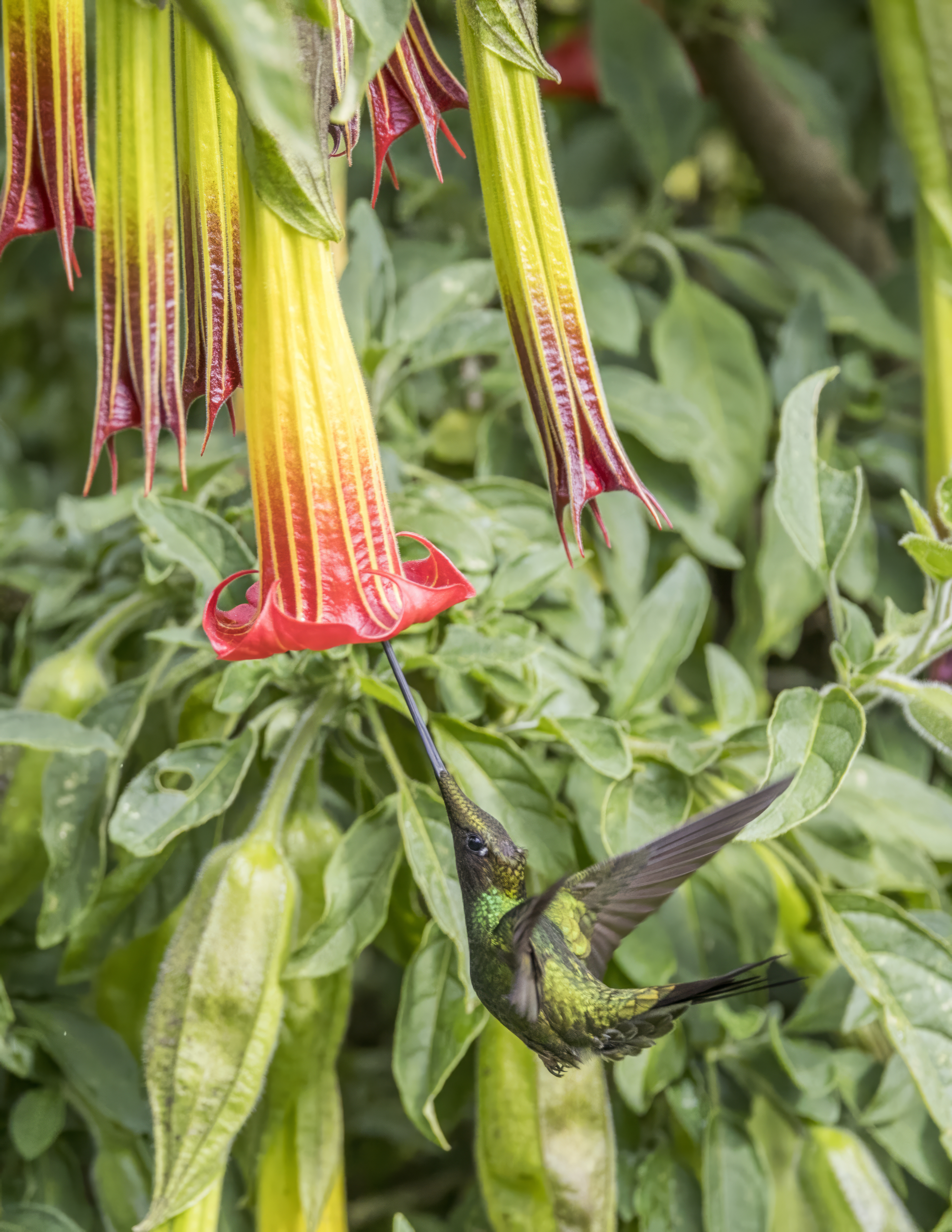
Pollination by the sword-billed hummingbird

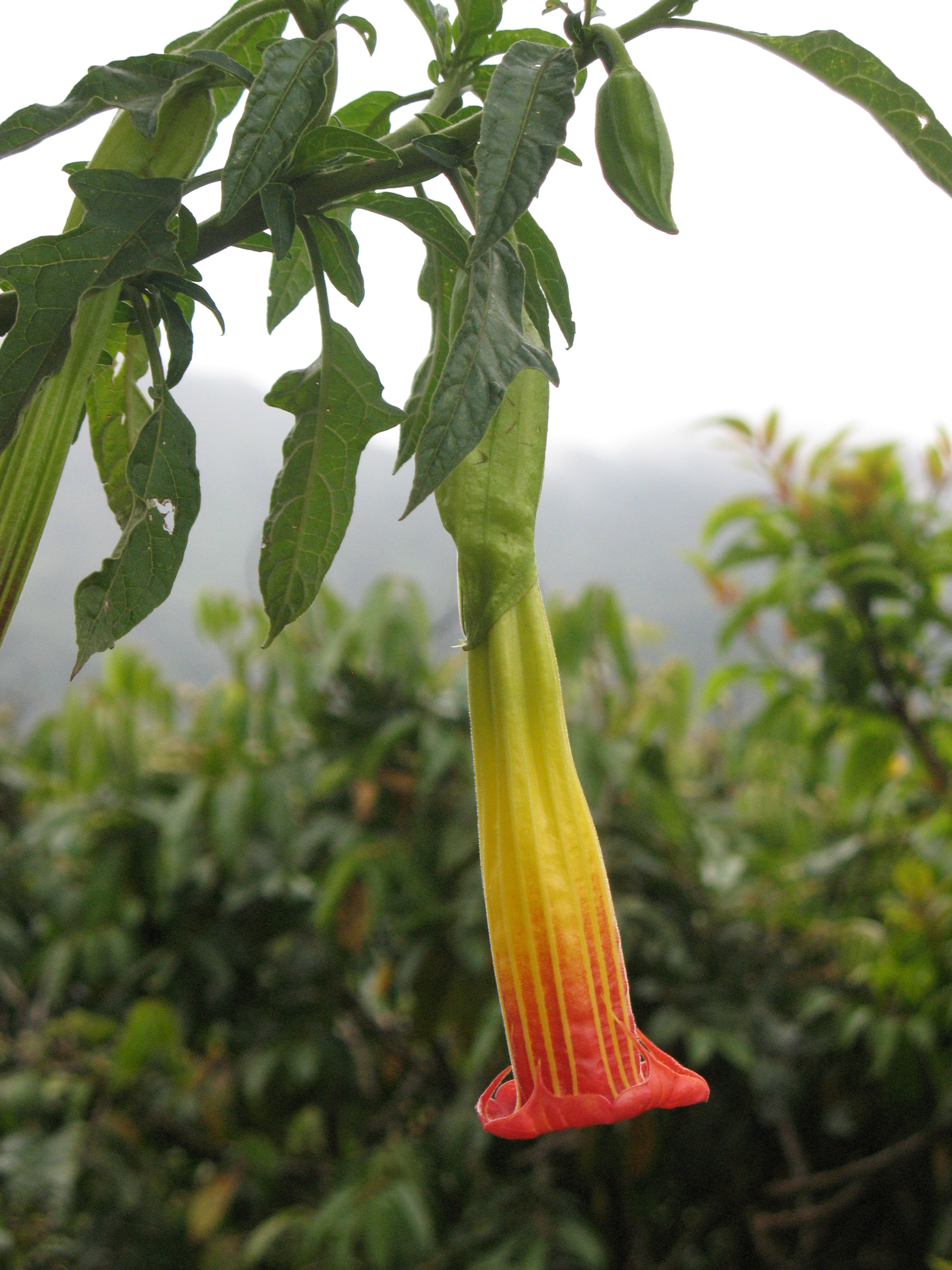

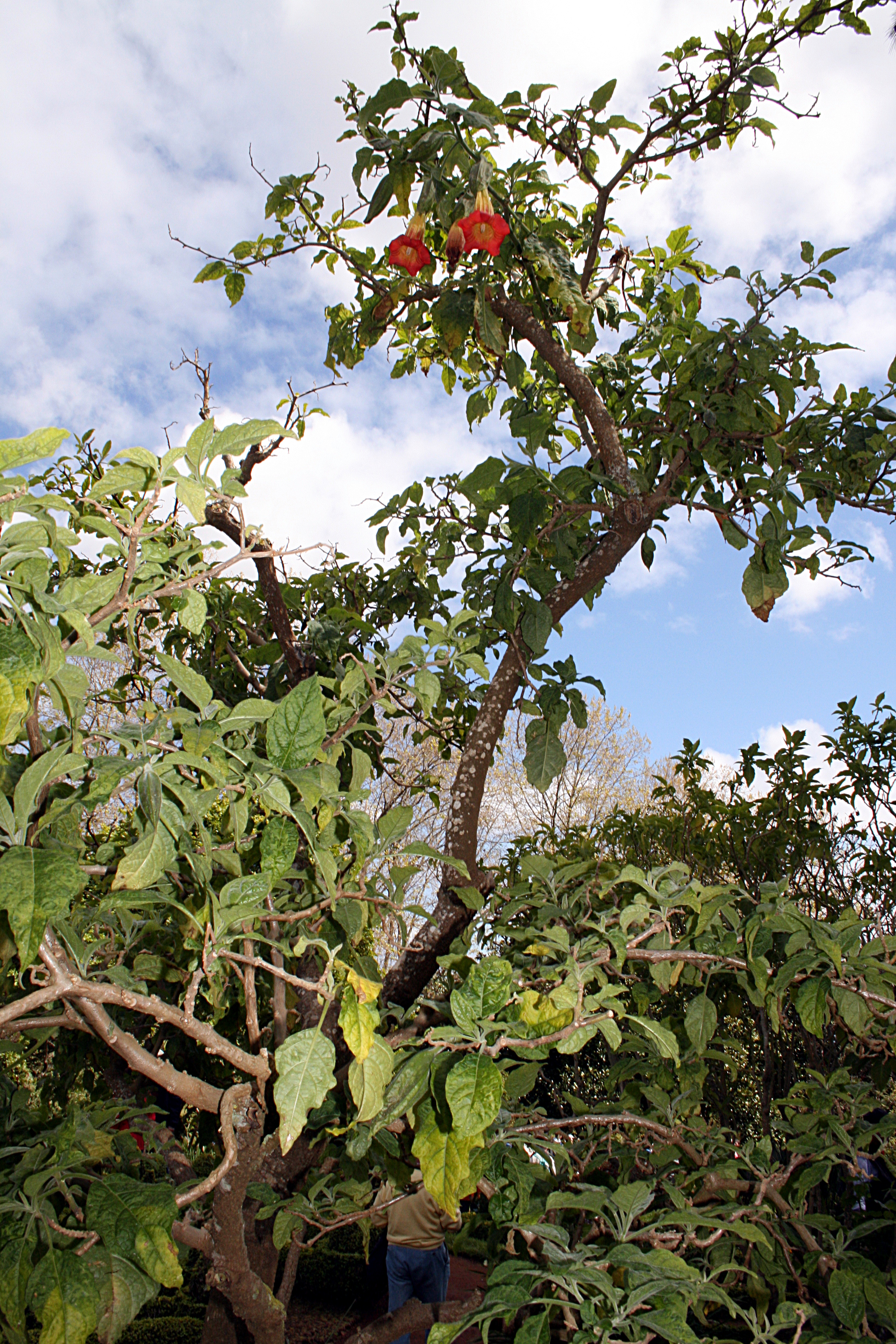

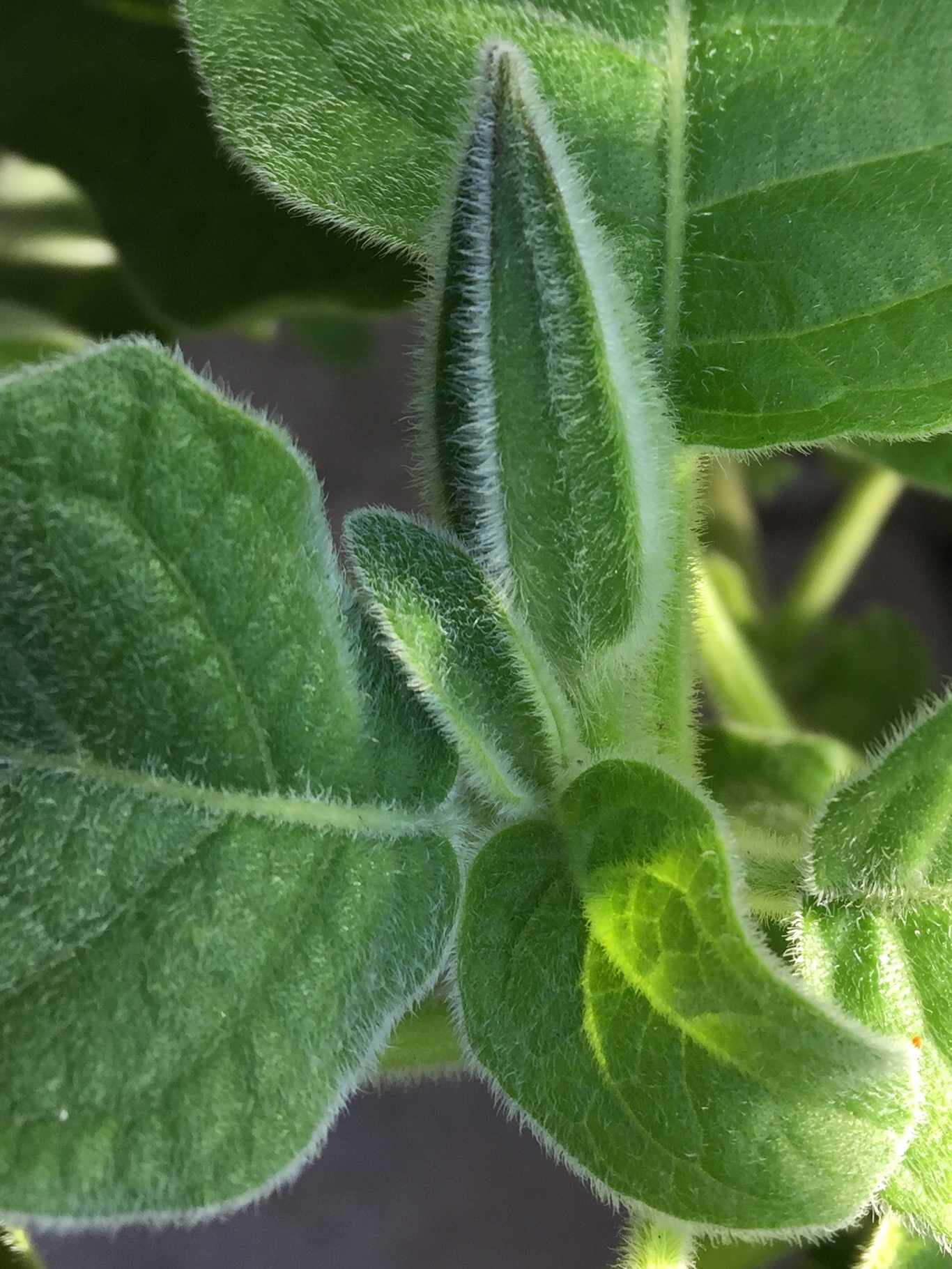

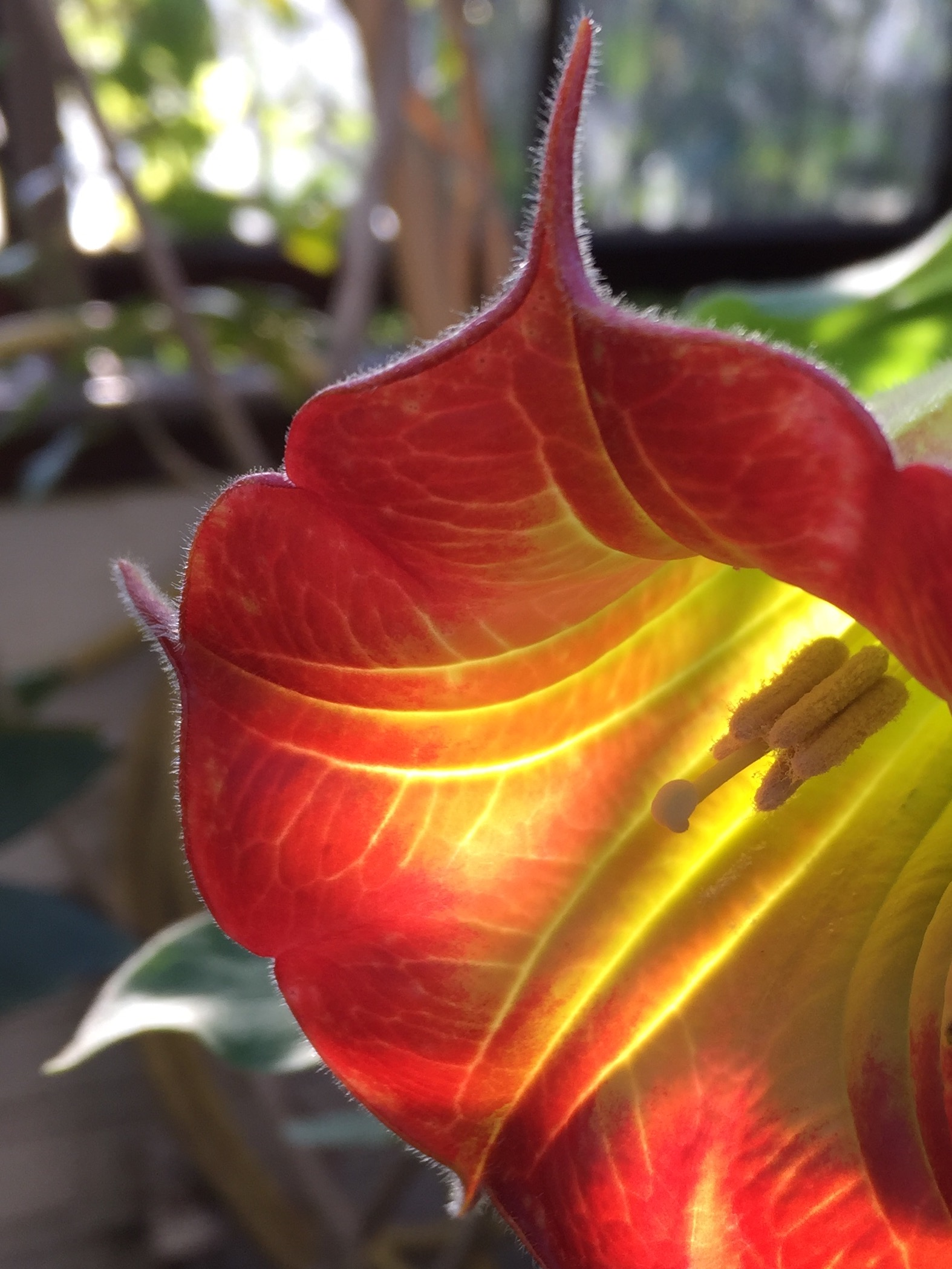
