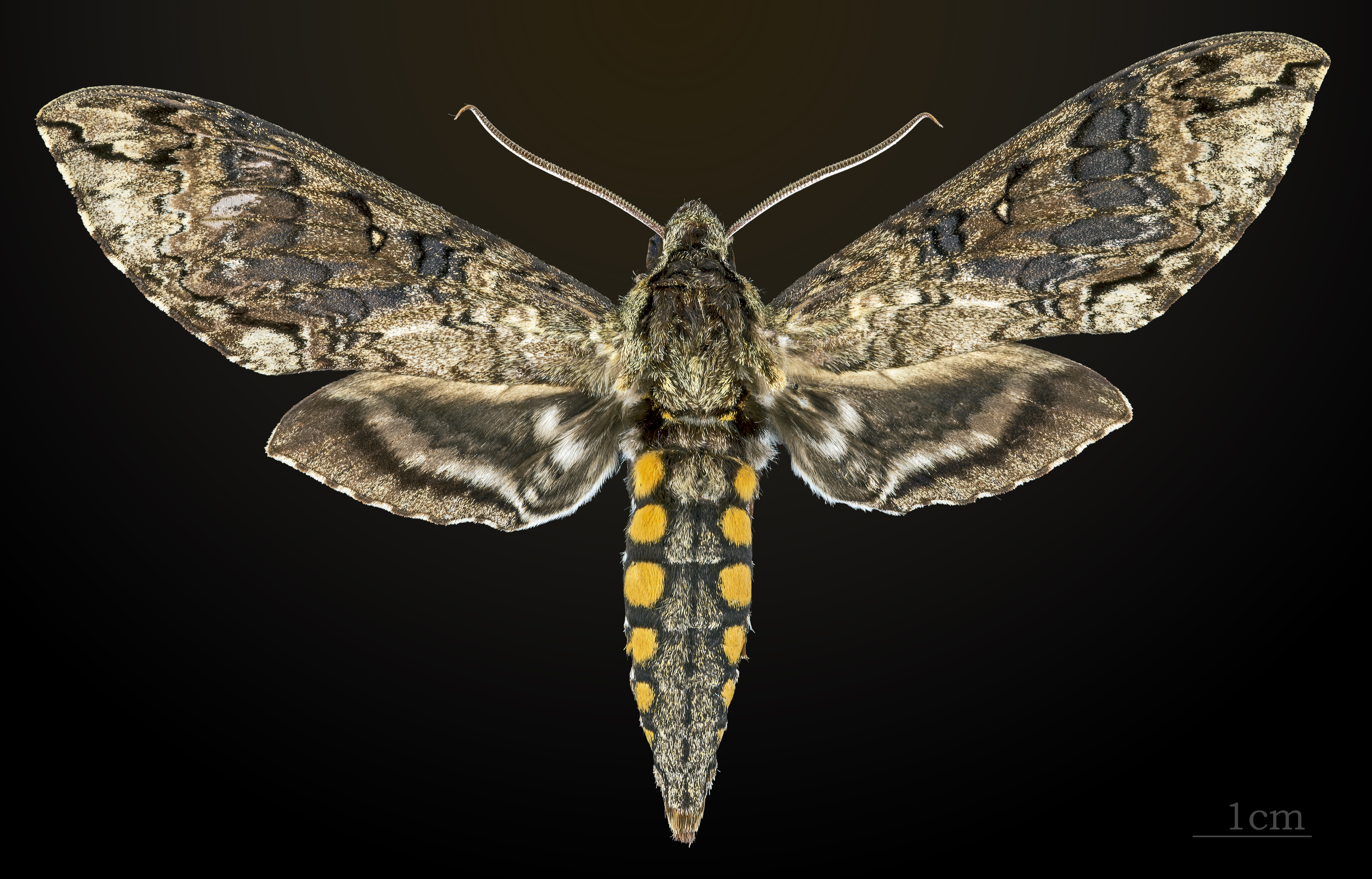
- Manduca brasiliensis Dorsal
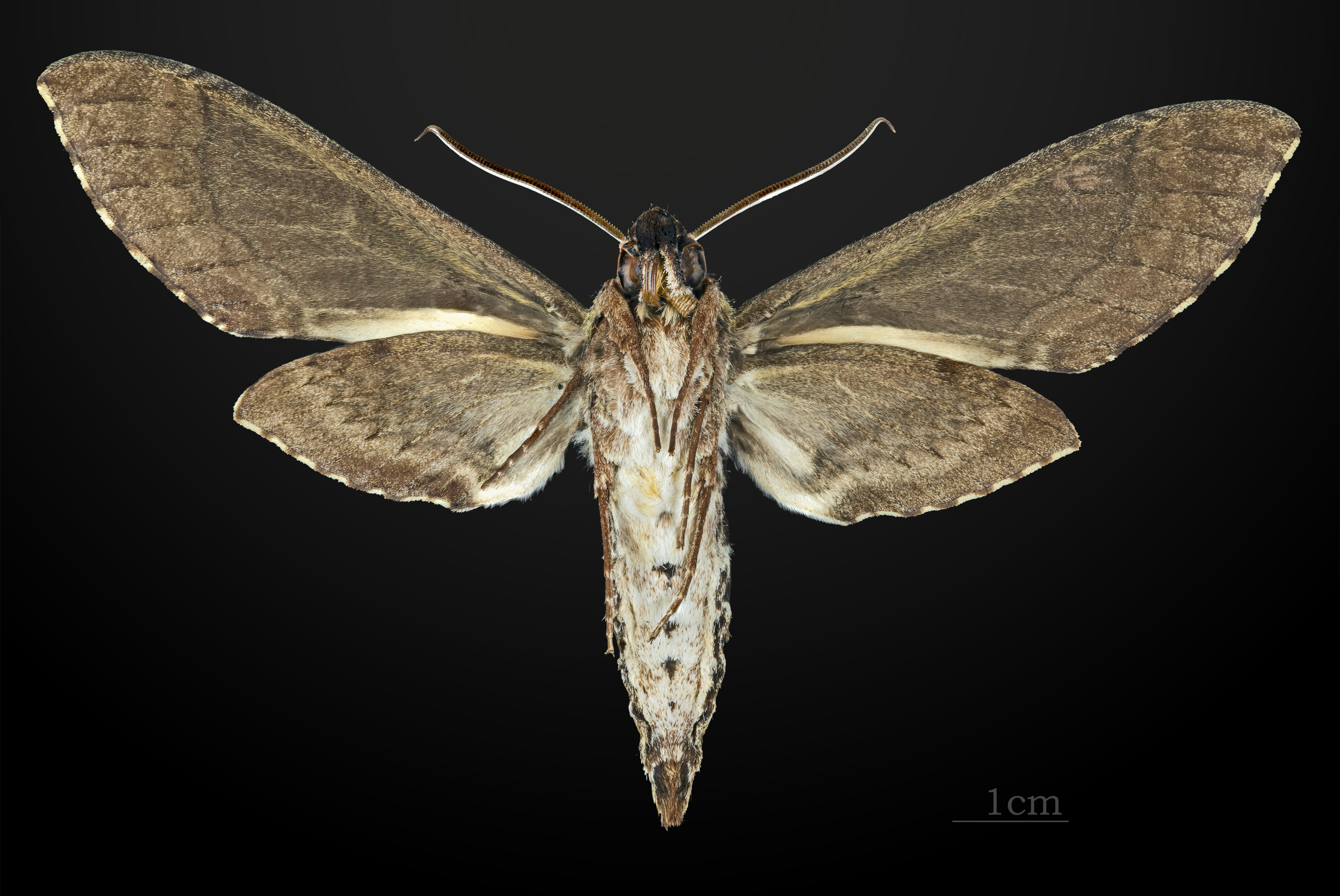
- Manduca brasiliensis ventral

Scientific classification
- Kingdom: Animalia
- Phylum: Arthropoda
- Class: Insecta
- Order: Lepidoptera
- Family: Sphingidae
- Genus: Manduca
- Species: M. brasiliensis

Binomial name
- Manduca brasiliensis (Jordan, 1911)

Synonyms
- Protoparce brasiliensis Jordan, 1911

= Manduca brasiliensis =

Species of moth

Manduca brasiliensis is a moth of the family Sphingidae.

== Distribution ==
It is found in Brazil, Argentina and Paraguay.

== Description ==
It is similar to Manduca scutata. The primary differences are as follows: it is smaller; the sides of the thorax and upper portion of the head and front wing are more greyish; there are smaller black spots on the underbelly; the black discal patches on the upper portion of the front wing are shorter; there is a broader black median band on the upper portion of the hind wing; and the black lines on the lower side of the hind wing are more prominent.

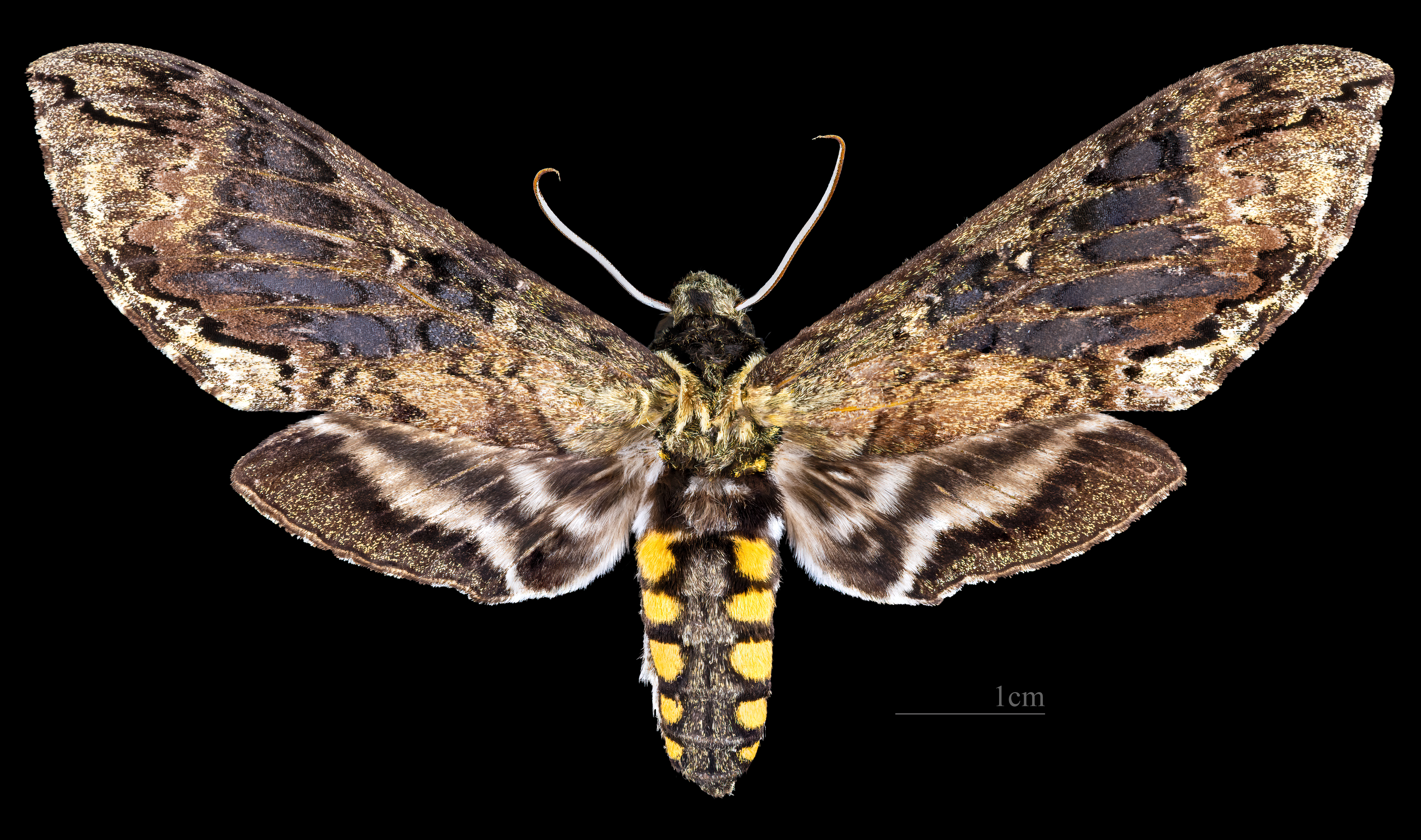
Female dorsal Coll. MHNT

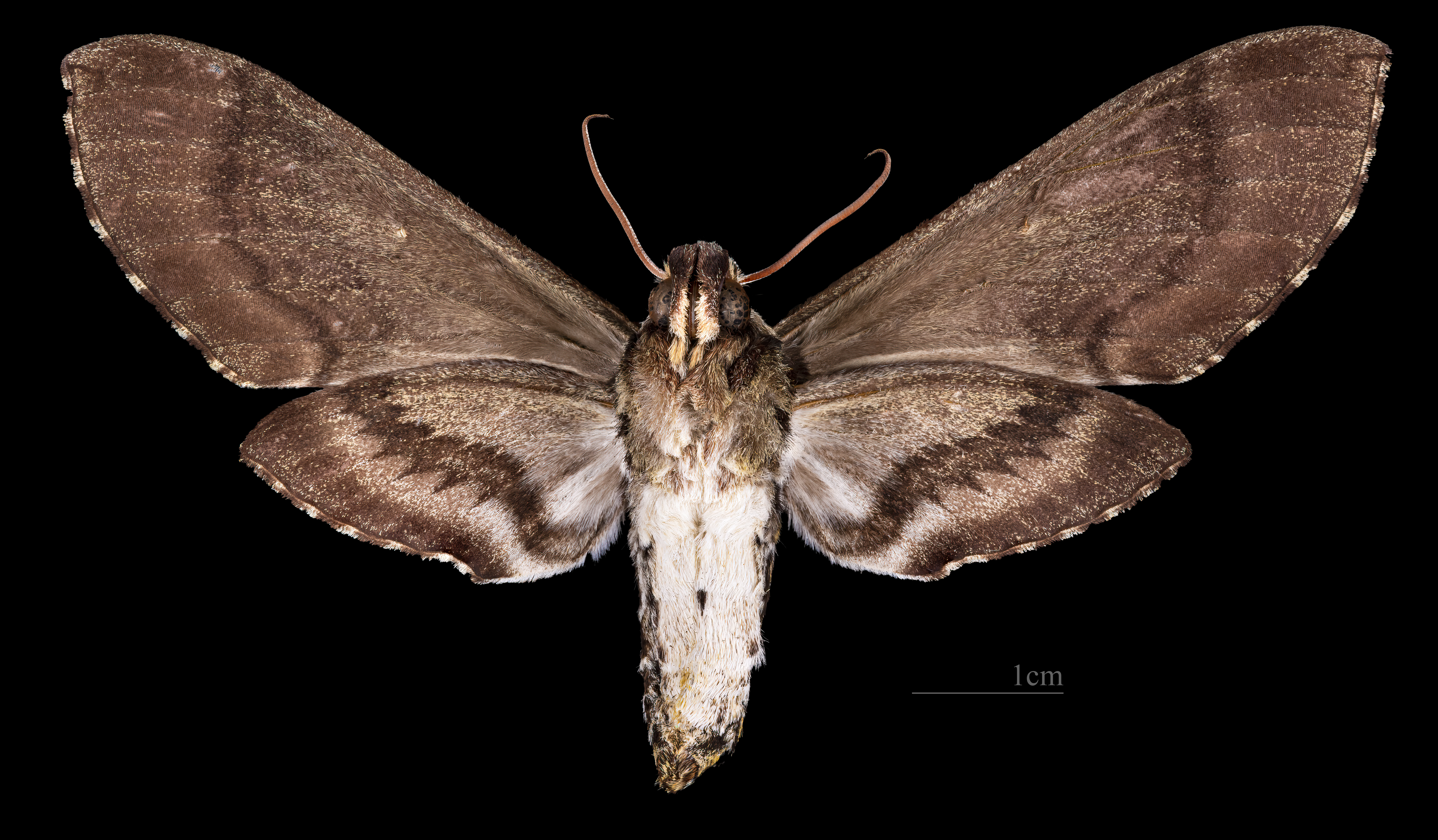
Female ventral Coll. MHNT
