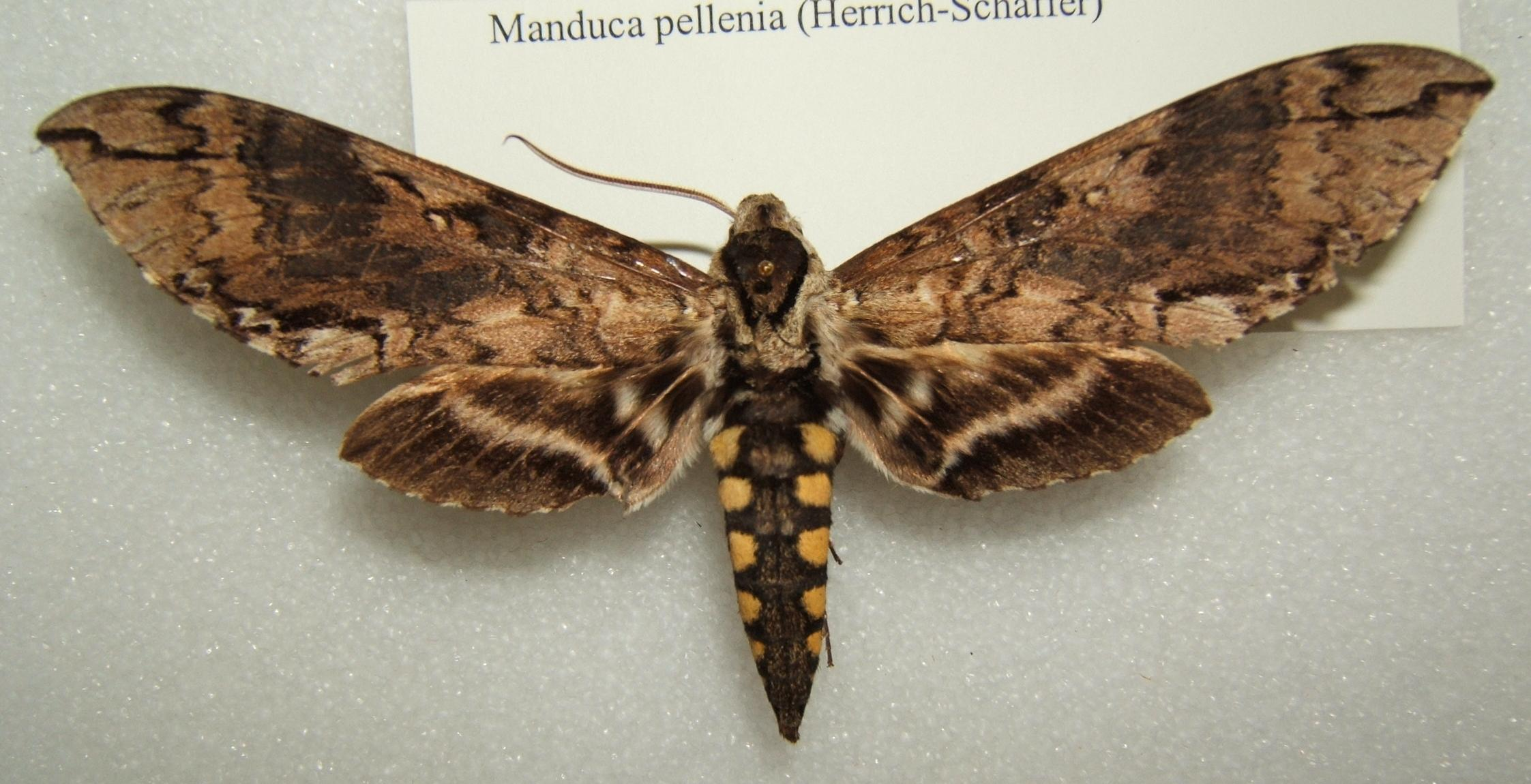
- Manduca pellenia, adult

Scientific classification
- Kingdom: Animalia
- Phylum: Arthropoda
- Class: Insecta
- Order: Lepidoptera
- Family: Sphingidae
- Genus: Manduca
- Species: M. pellenia

Binomial name
- Manduca pellenia (Herrich-Schäffer, 1854)

Synonyms
- Chaerocampa pellenia Herrich-Schäffer, 1854; Sphinx capsici Boisduval, 1875

= Manduca pellenia =

Species of moth

Manduca pellenia is a moth of the family Sphingidae. It is known from Mexico, Belize, Guatemala, Nicaragua, Costa Rica, Panama, Colombia and Ecuador.

The wingspan is 107–126 mm. The underside of the abdomen is shaded with brown scales, especially in the male. There are heavy, discal, black patches found on the forewing upperside with, forming a band.

There is probably one generation per year in Costa Rica with adults on wing from September to November. They feed on flower nectar.

The larvae feed on Solanum hayesii and Cestrum megalophyllum.
