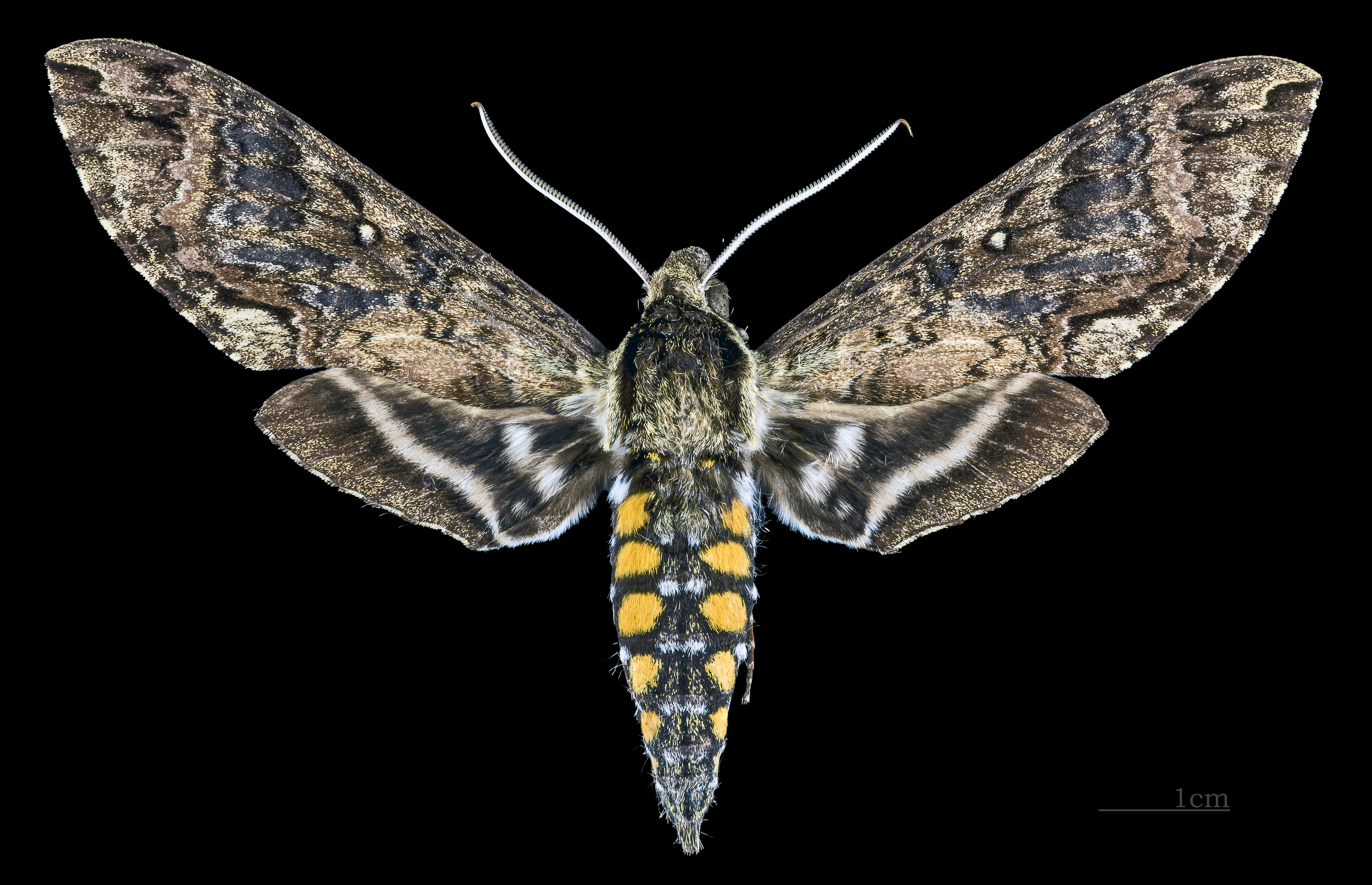
- Manduca scutata male dorsal MHNT
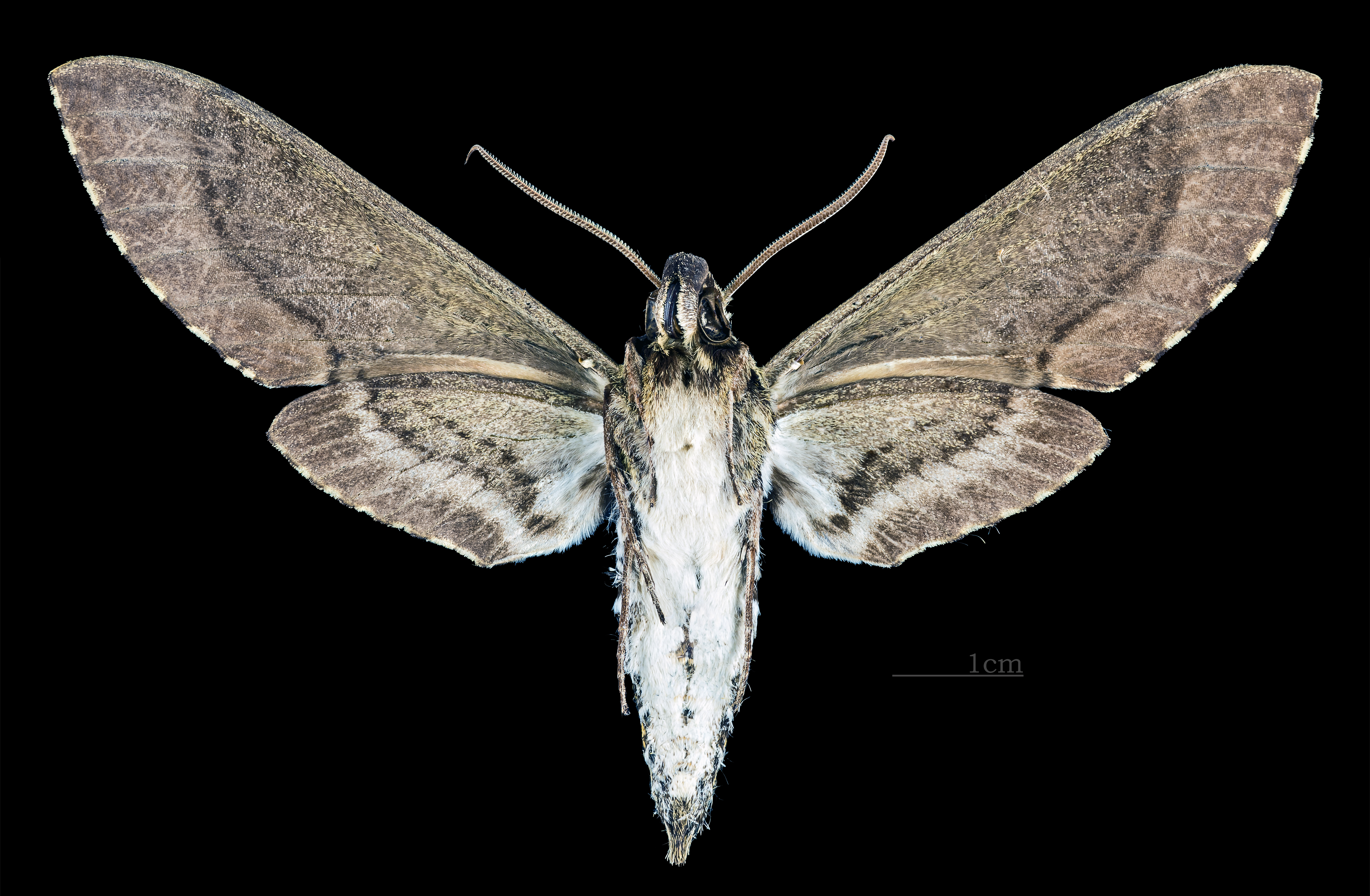
- Manduca scutata male ventral MHNT

Scientific classification
- Kingdom: Animalia
- Phylum: Arthropoda
- Class: Insecta
- Order: Lepidoptera
- Family: Sphingidae
- Genus: Manduca
- Species: M. scutata

Binomial name
- Manduca scutata (Rothschild & Jordan, 1903)

Synonyms
- Protoparce scutata Rothschild & Jordan, 1903; Protoparce henrici Gehlen, 1926

= Manduca scutata =

Species of moth

Manduca scutata is a moth of the family Sphingidae.

== Distribution ==
It is found from Venezuela south to Bolivia and northern Argentina.

== Description ==
The wingspan is about 95 mm.

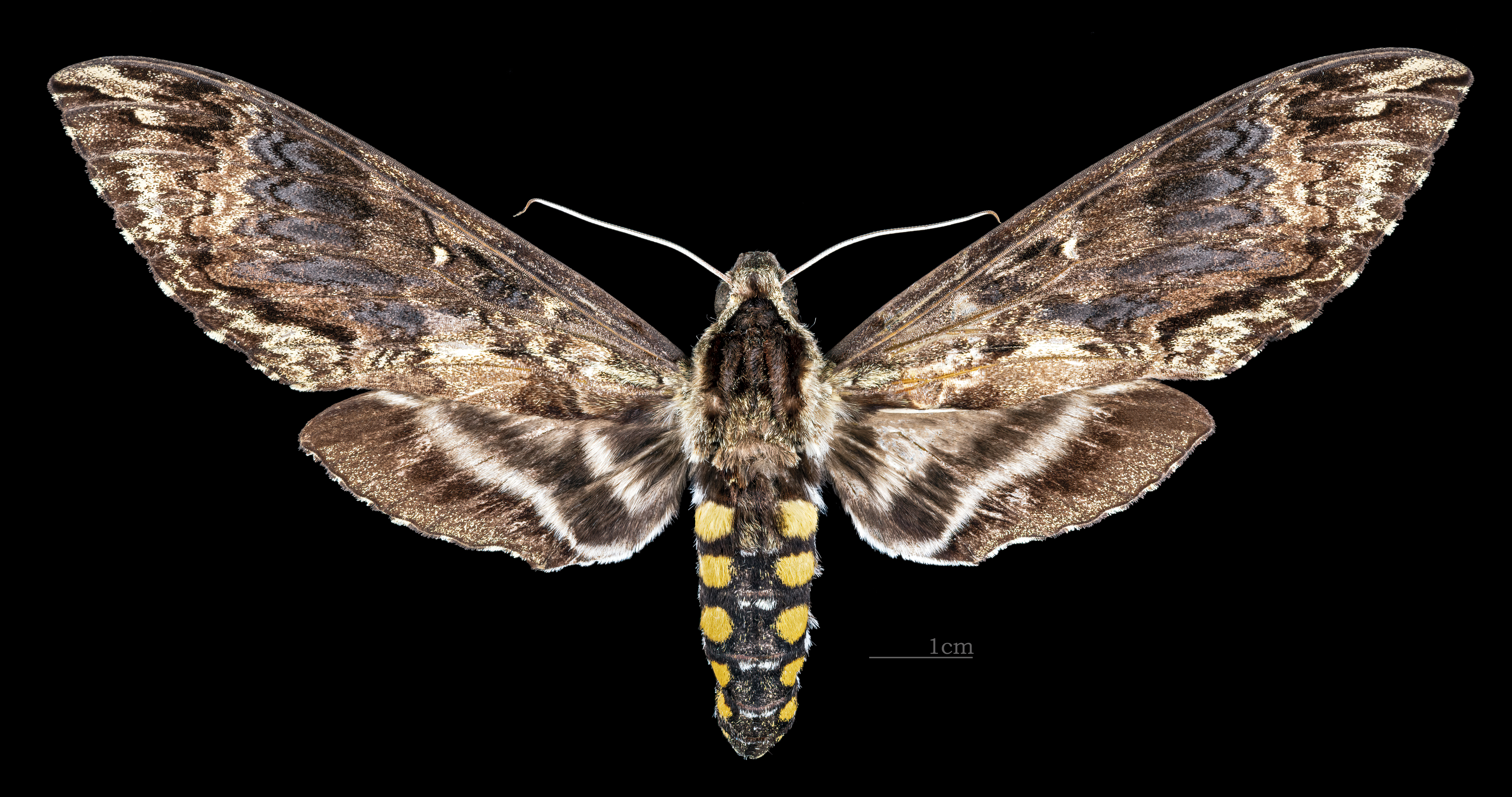
Female Dorsal side

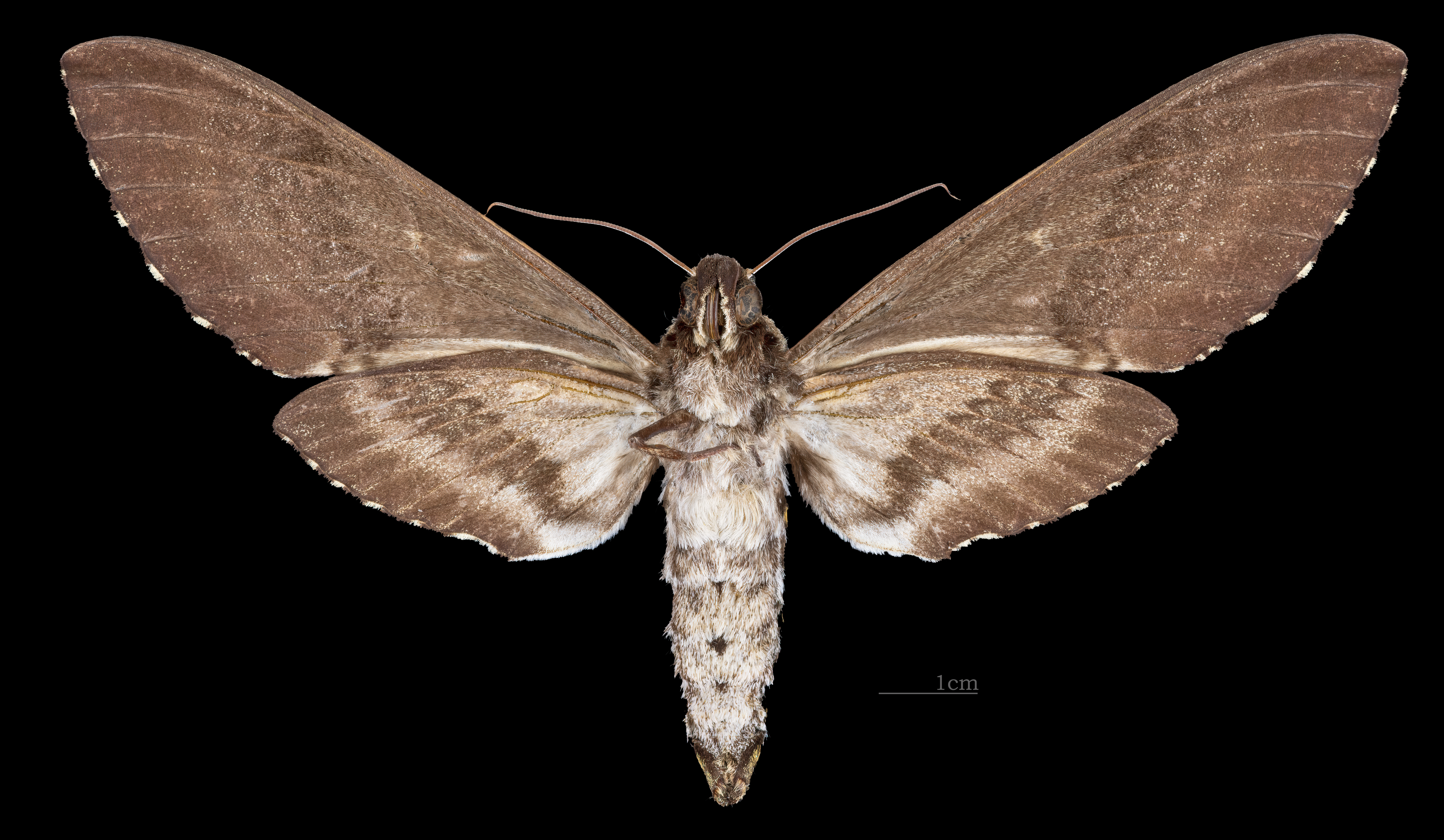
Female Ventral side

== Biology ==
Adults have been recorded in November.
