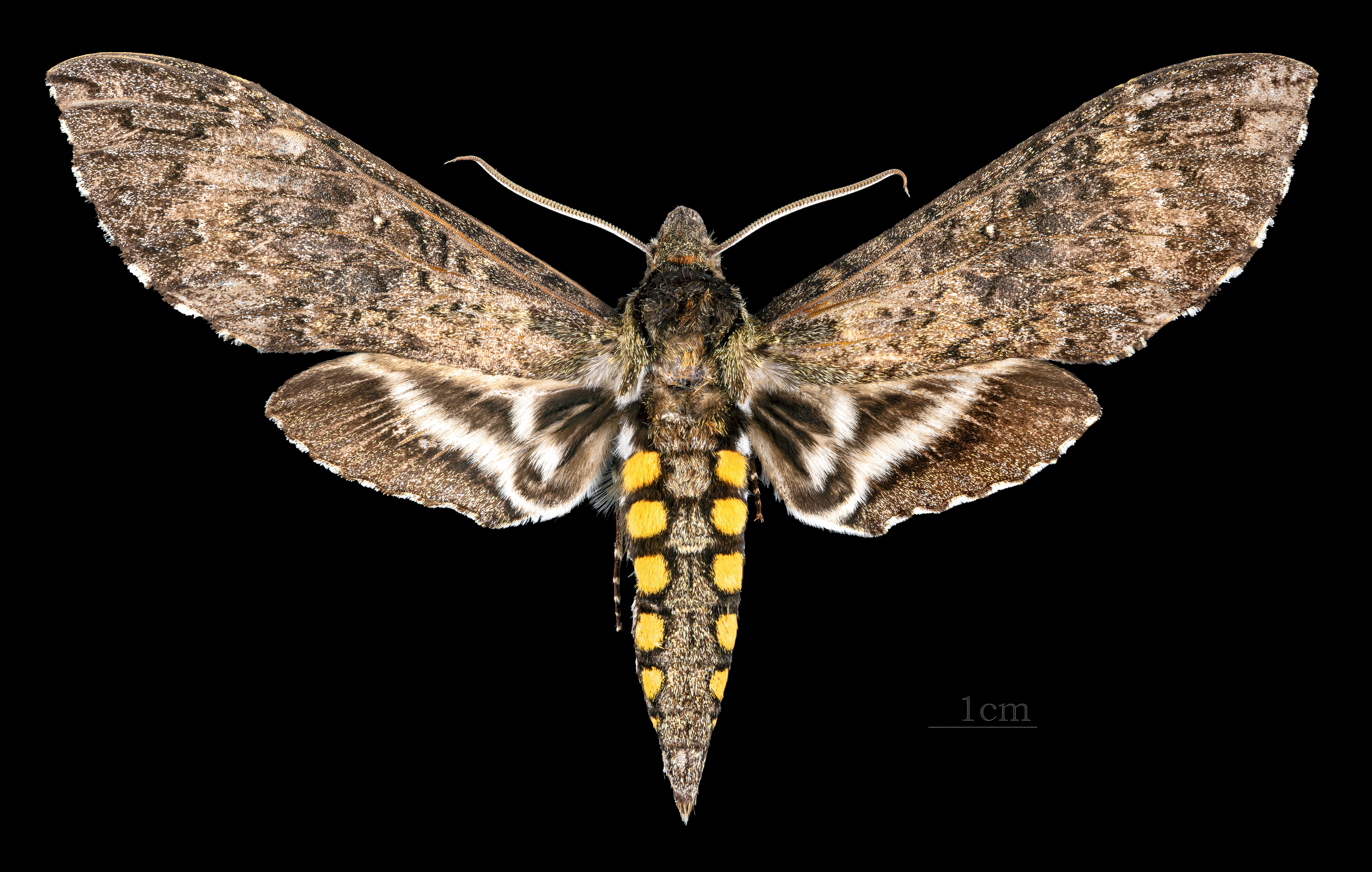
- Manduca occulta ♂
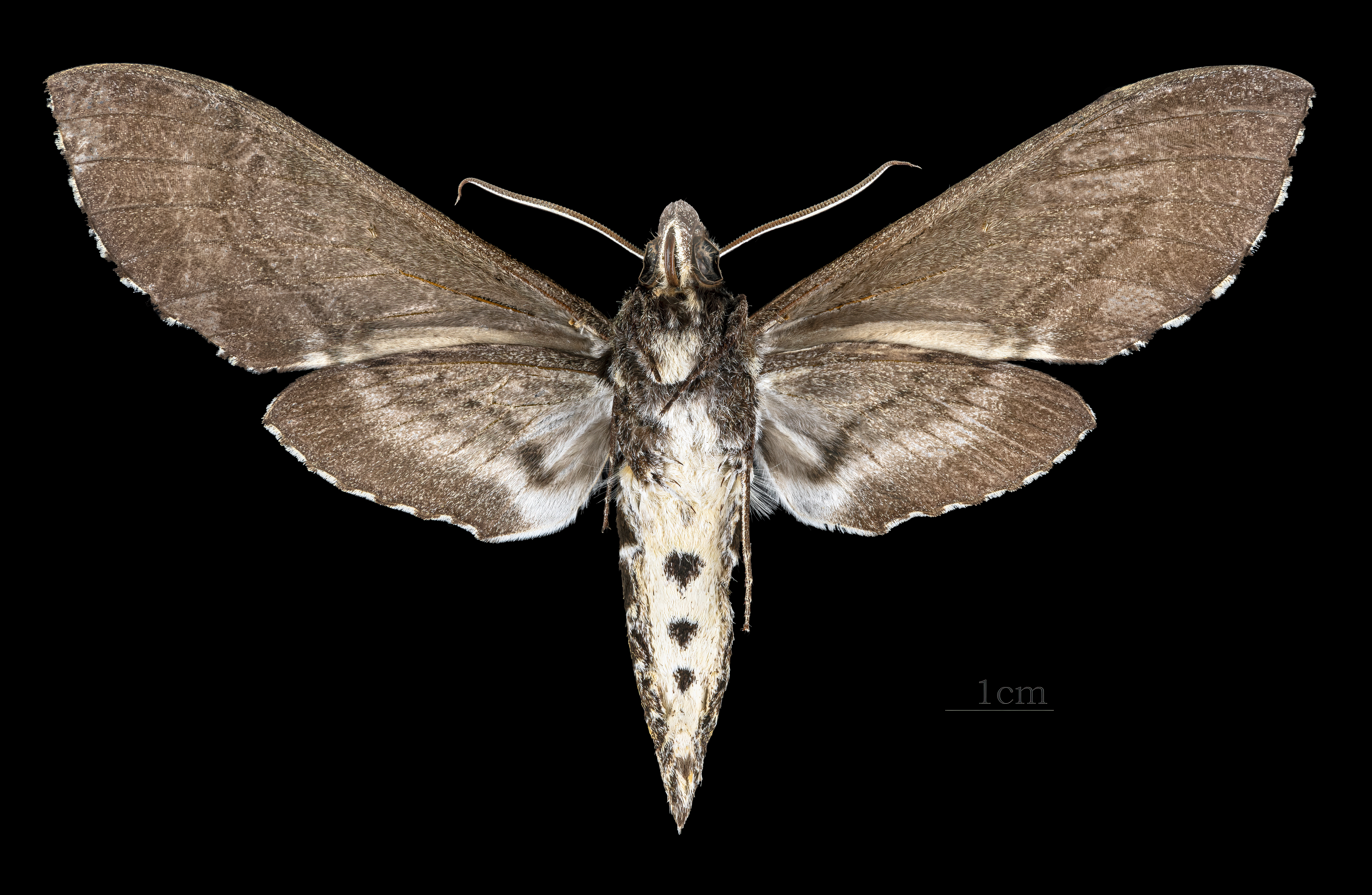
- Manduca occulta ♂ △

Conservation status
- Apparently Secure (NatureServe)

Scientific classification
- Kingdom: Animalia
- Phylum: Arthropoda
- Class: Insecta
- Order: Lepidoptera
- Family: Sphingidae
- Genus: Manduca
- Species: M. occulta

Binomial name
- Manduca occulta (Rothschild & Jordan, 1903)

Synonyms
- Protoparce occulta Rothschild & Jordan, 1903; Protoparce occulta pacifica Mooser, 1940

= Manduca occulta =

Occult sphinx

Species of moth

Manduca occulta, the occult sphinx, is a moth of the family Sphingidae.

== Distribution ==
The species was first described by Rothschild & Karl Jordan in 1903. It is found from Panama north through Central America (including Belize, Guatemala, Nicaragua and Costa Rica) and Mexico to southern Arizona and on occasion southern Florida.

== Description ==
The wingspan is 105–120 mm. It is similar to Manduca diffissa tropicalis and can be distinguished only by a study of the genitalia. There are brownish-black bands on the hindwing underside.

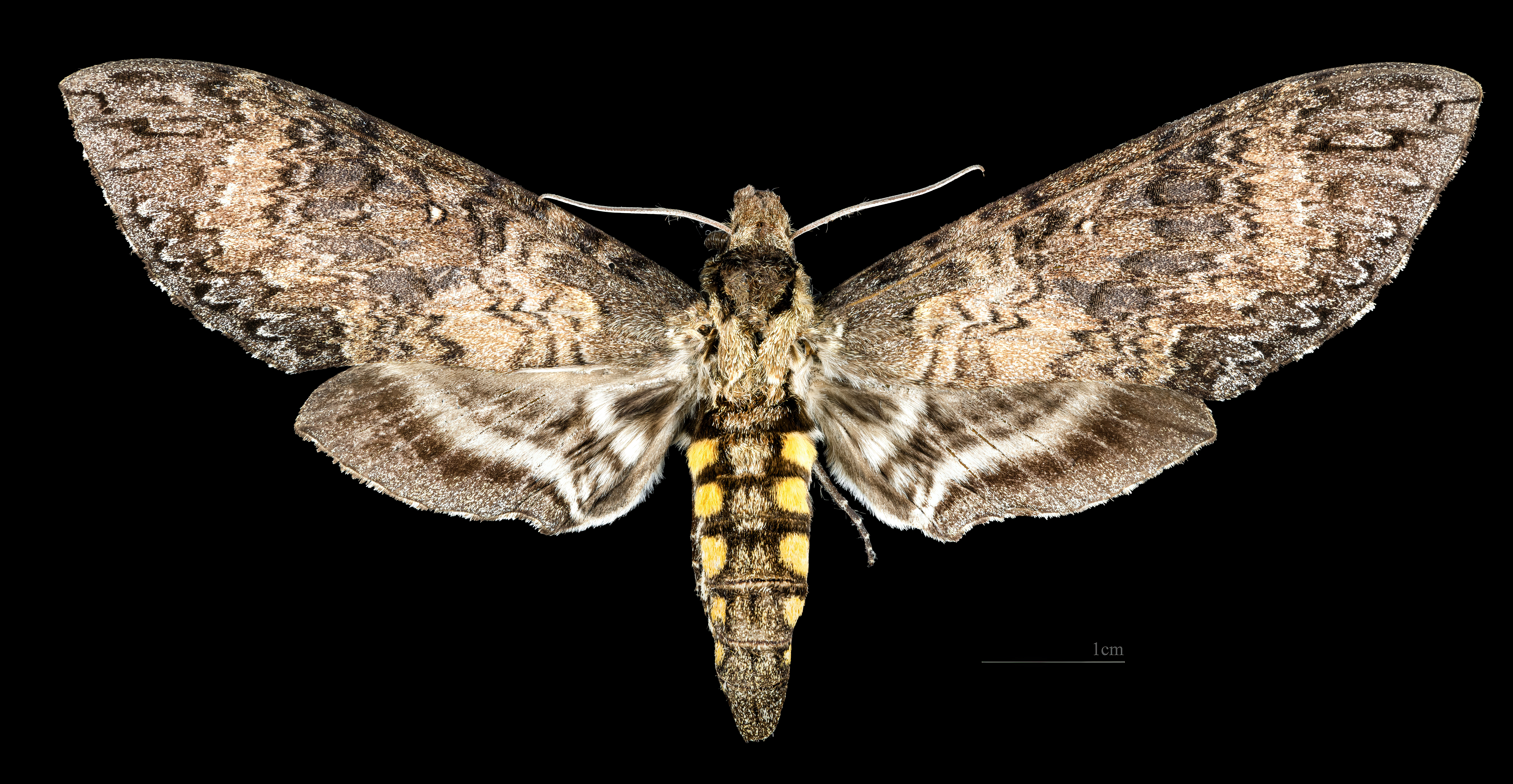
Female Dorsal side

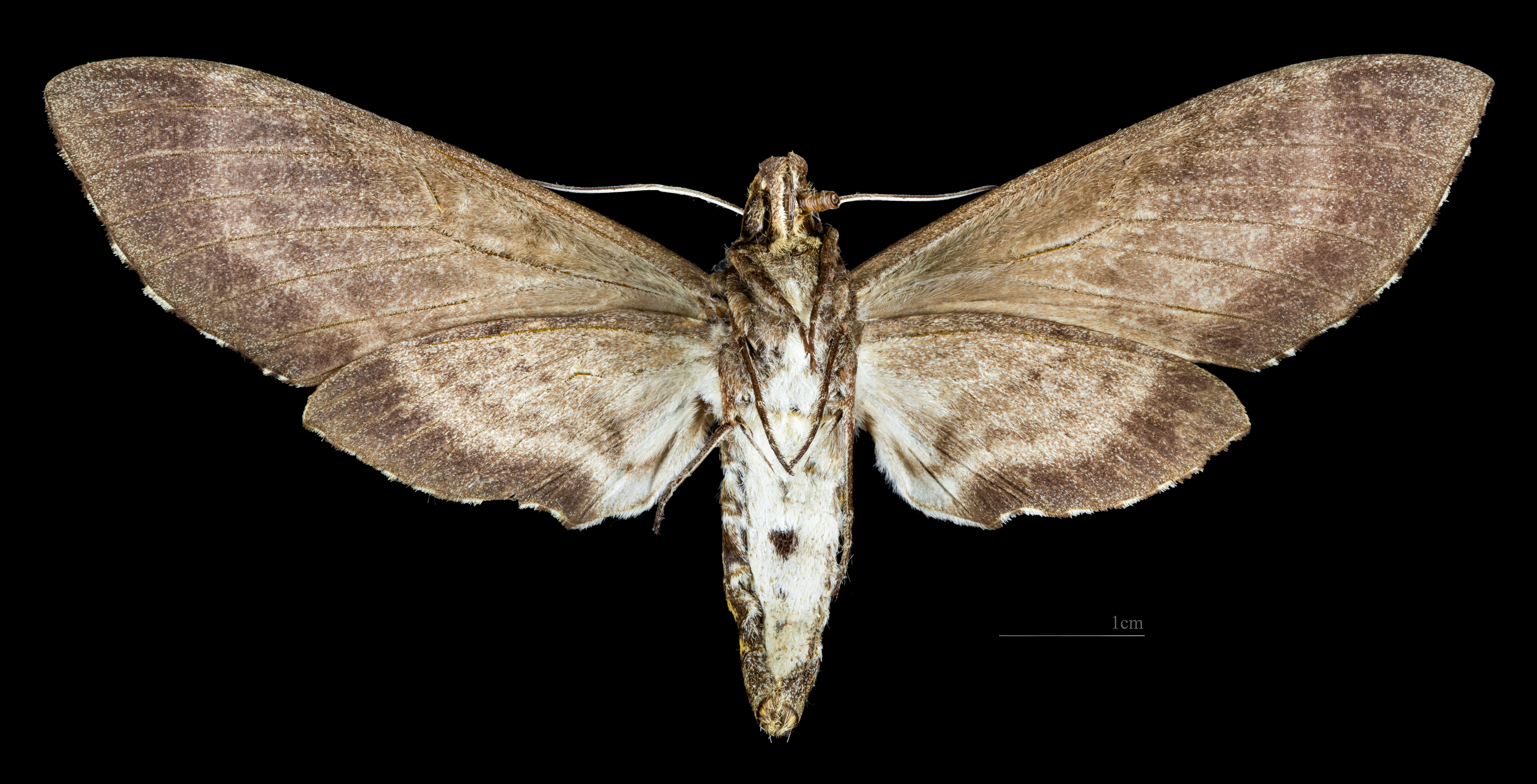
Female △ Ventral side

== Biology ==
There is one generation per year in Costa Rica with adults on wing from May to June. In Nicaragua, adults have been recorded from July to August and in October. Strays in Florida have been recorded in September. They feed on the nectar of various flowers.

The larvae feed on Cestrum glanduliferum, Cestrum racemosum, Solanum accrescens and Solanum hazenii.
