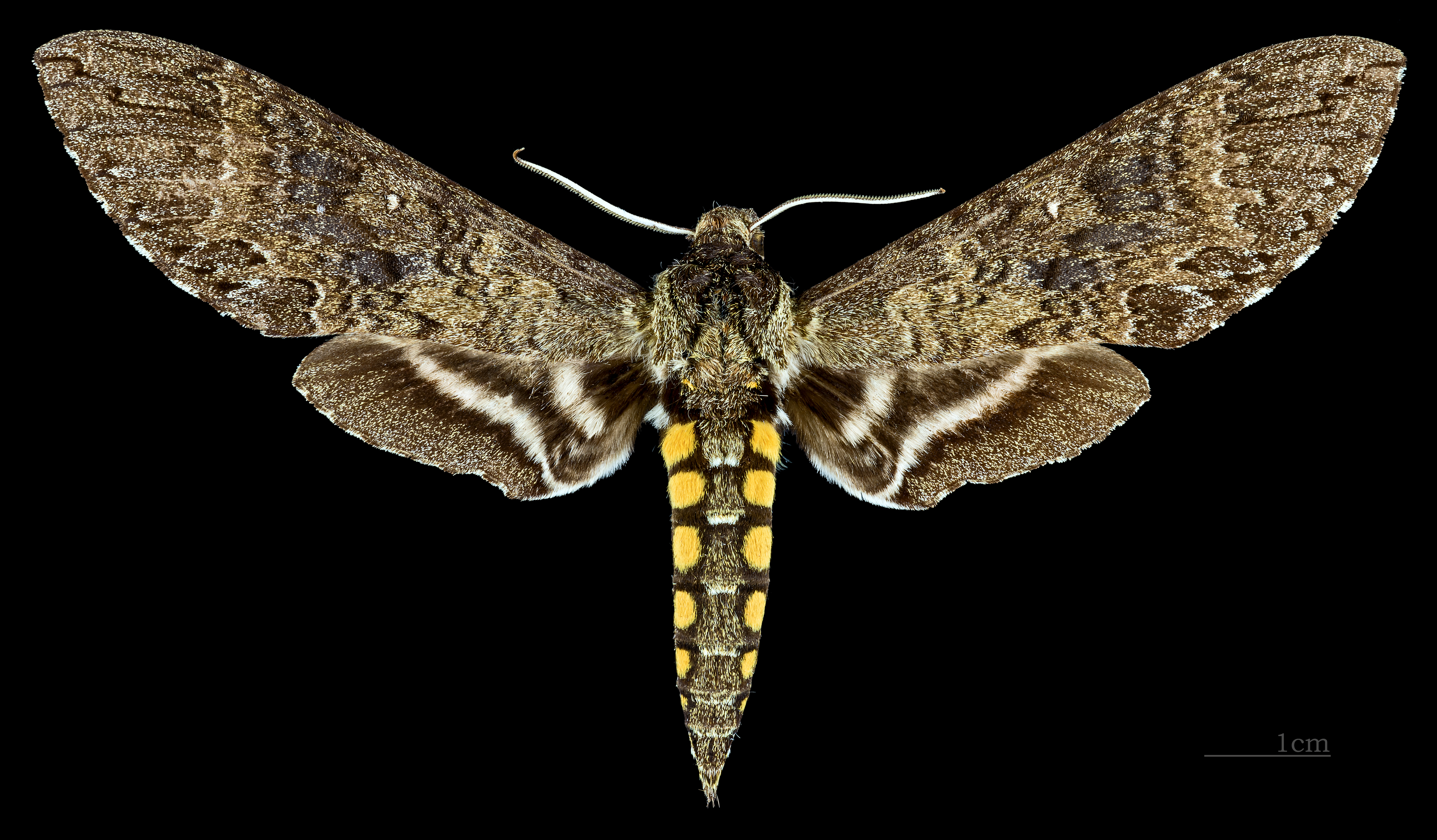
- Male, dorsal view
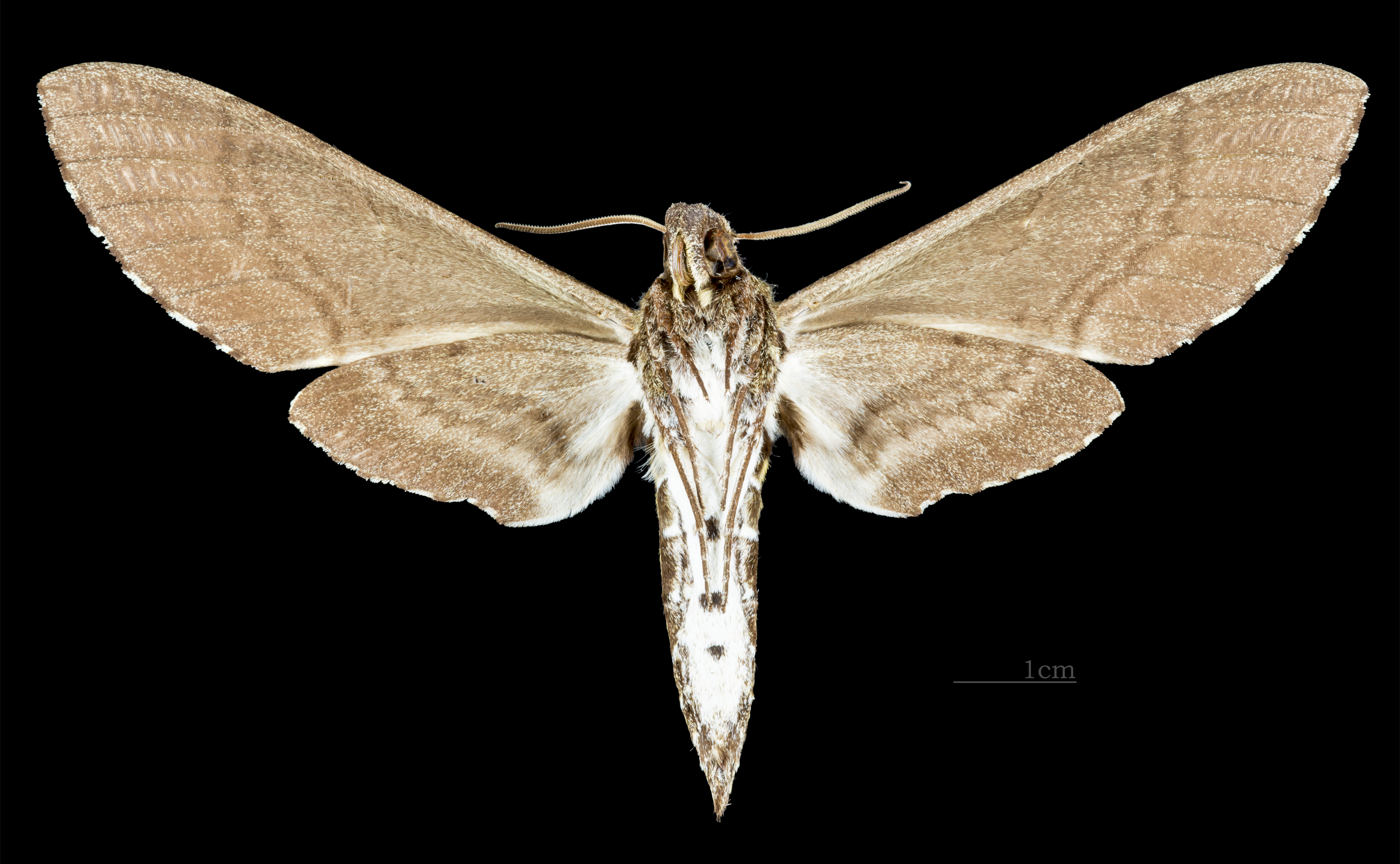
- Male, ventral view

Scientific classification
- Domain: Eukaryota
- Kingdom: Animalia
- Phylum: Arthropoda
- Class: Insecta
- Order: Lepidoptera
- Family: Sphingidae
- Genus: Manduca
- Species: M. diffissa

Binomial name
- Manduca diffissa (Butler, 1871)

Synonyms
- Sphinx diffissa Butler, 1871; Protoparce diffissa ochracea Clark, 1927; Protoparce diffissa mesosa Rothschild & Jordan, 1916; Sphinx diffissa petuniae Boisduval, 1875; Protoparce diffissa tropicalis Rothschild & Jordan, 1903; Protoparce diffissa zischkai Kernbach, 1952

= Manduca diffissa =

Species of moth

Manduca diffissa is a moth of the family Sphingidae first described by Arthur Gardiner Butler in 1871. It is known from most of South America.

== Description ==
The wingspan is 100–105 mm.

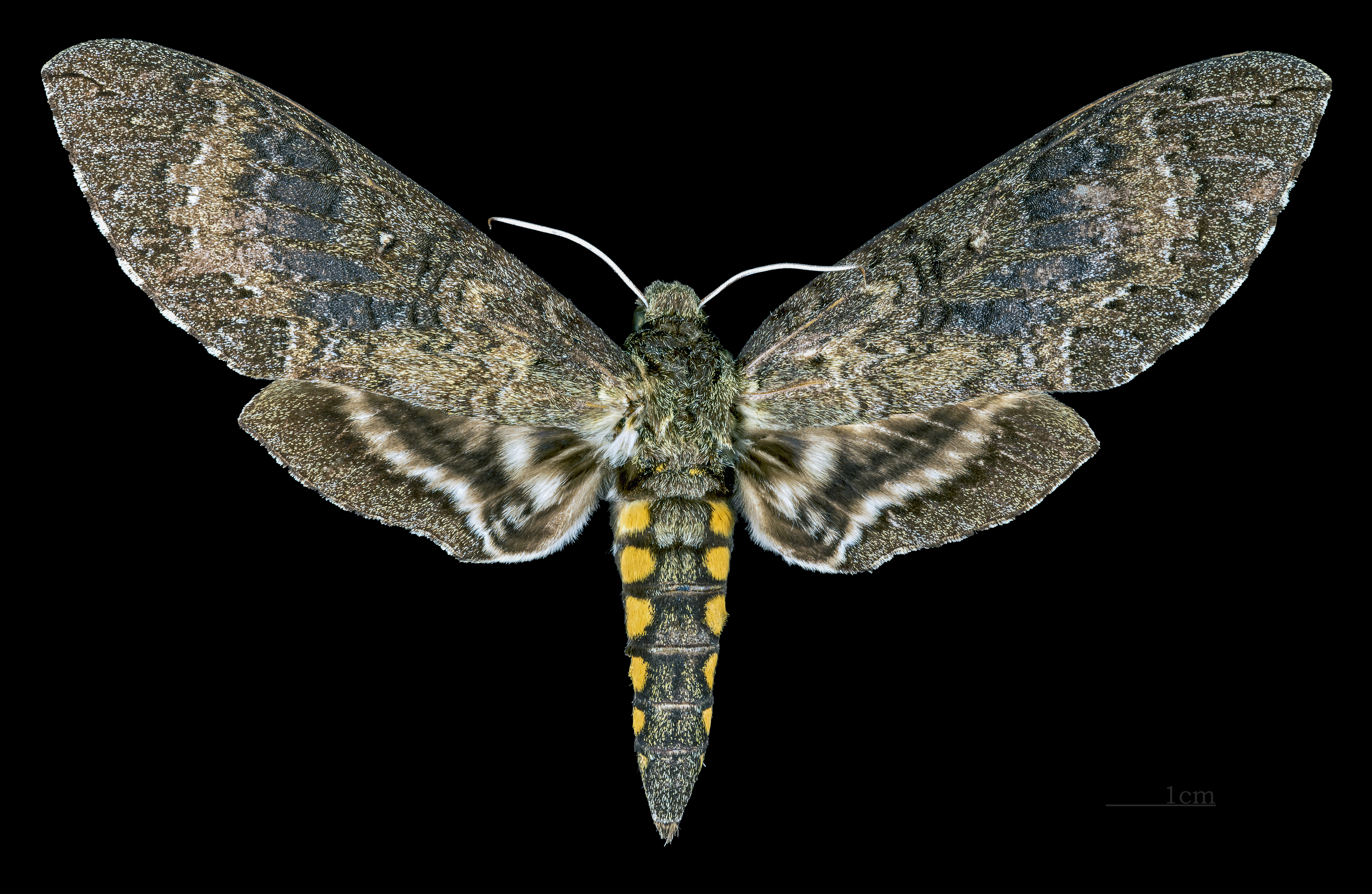
Female, dorsal view

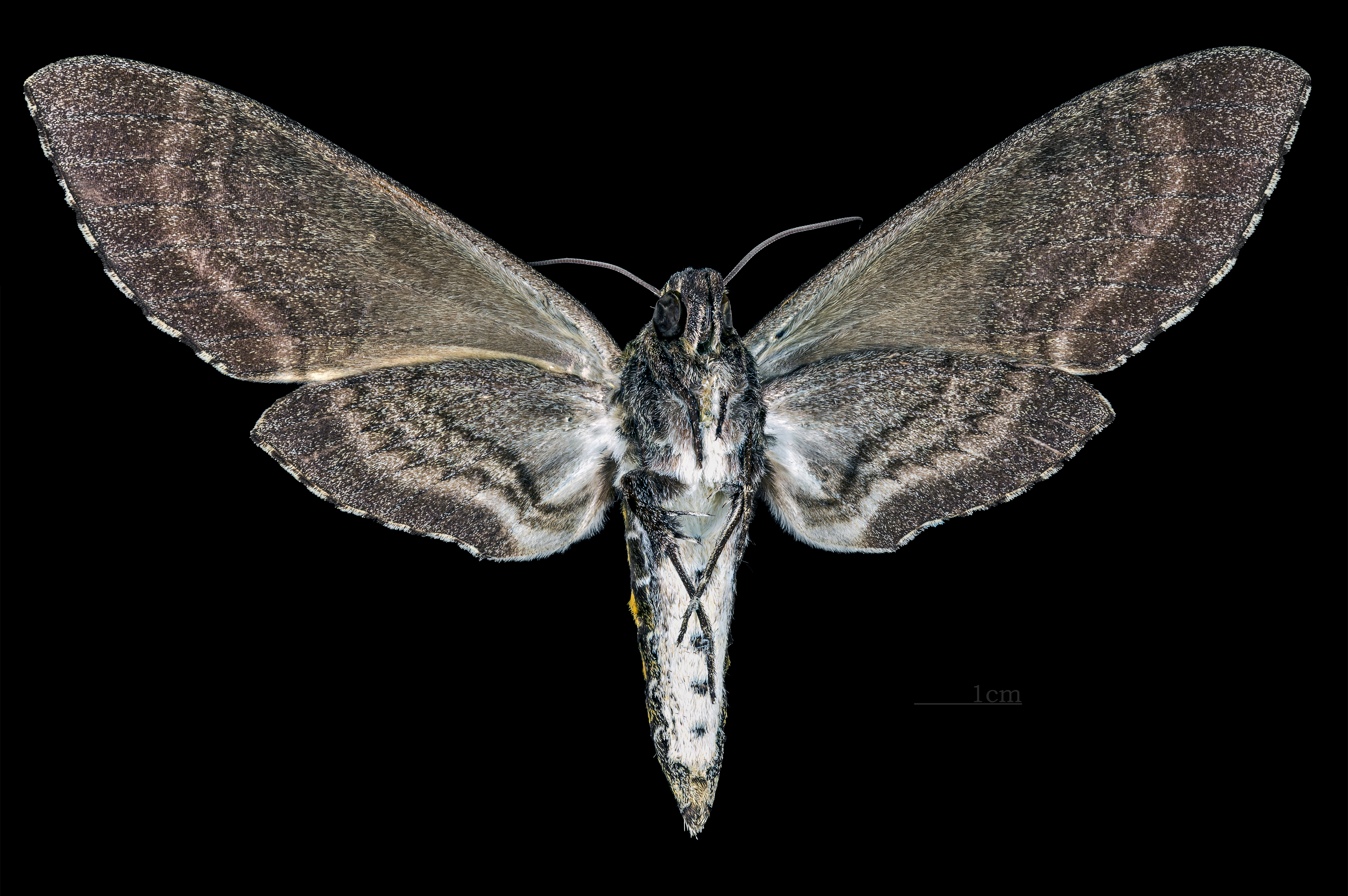
Female, ventral view

== Biology ==
Adult moths have been recorded from July to August and from September to December.

== Subspecies ==
- Manduca diffissa diffissa (Butler, 1871) (Argentina and Uruguay)
- Manduca diffissa mesosa (Rothschild & Jordan, 1916) (Argentina and Bolivia)
- Manduca diffissa petuniae (Boisduval, 1875) (south-eastern Brazil, Argentina, Bolivia)
- Manduca diffissa tropicalis (Rothschild & Jordan, 1903) (Guyana, French Guiana, Venezuela, Colombia, Bolivia, Brazil and Nicaragua)
- Manduca diffissa zischkai (Kernbach, 1952) (Bolivia)
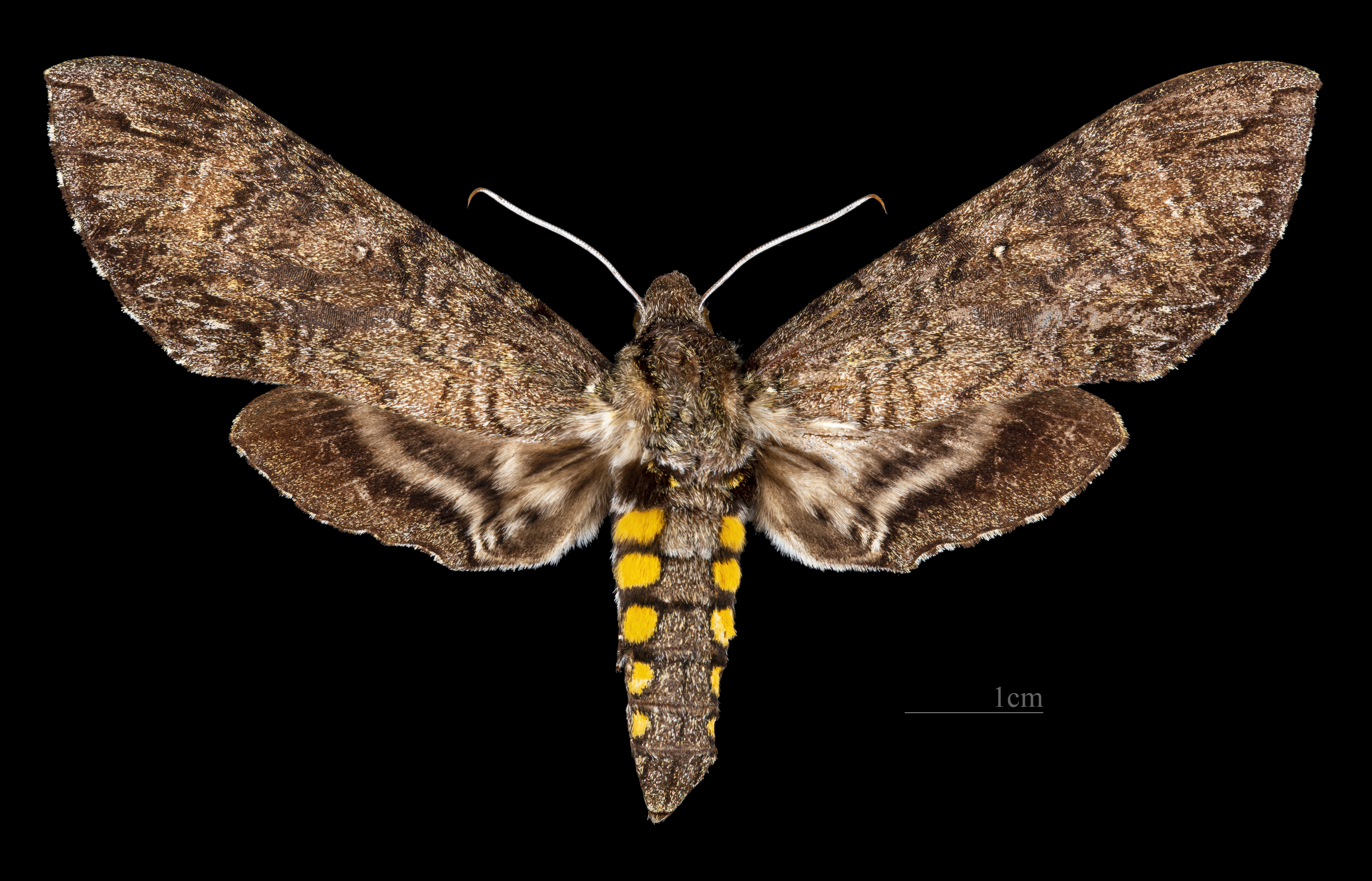
Manduca diffissa mesosa♂

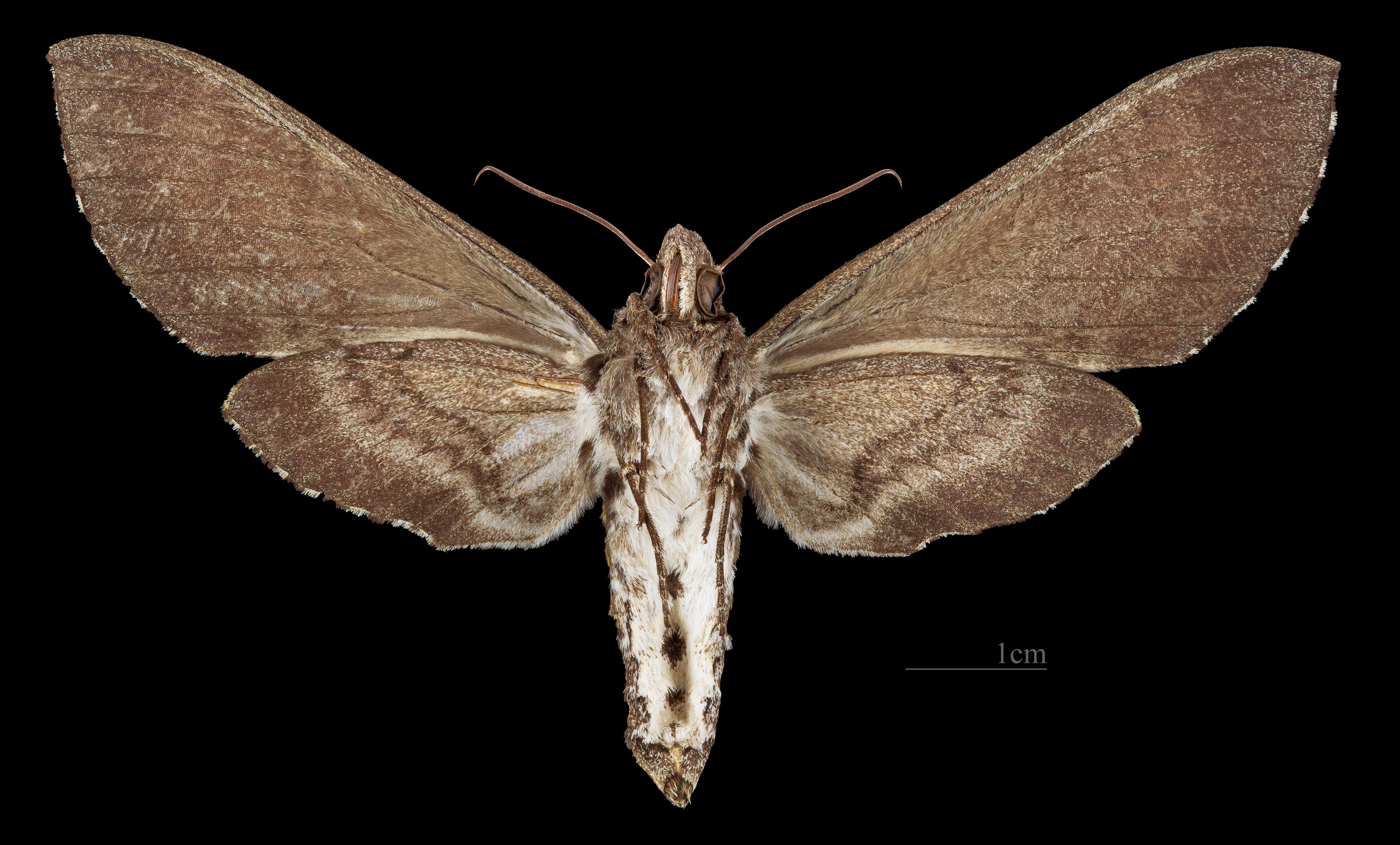
Manduca diffissa mesosa♂ △
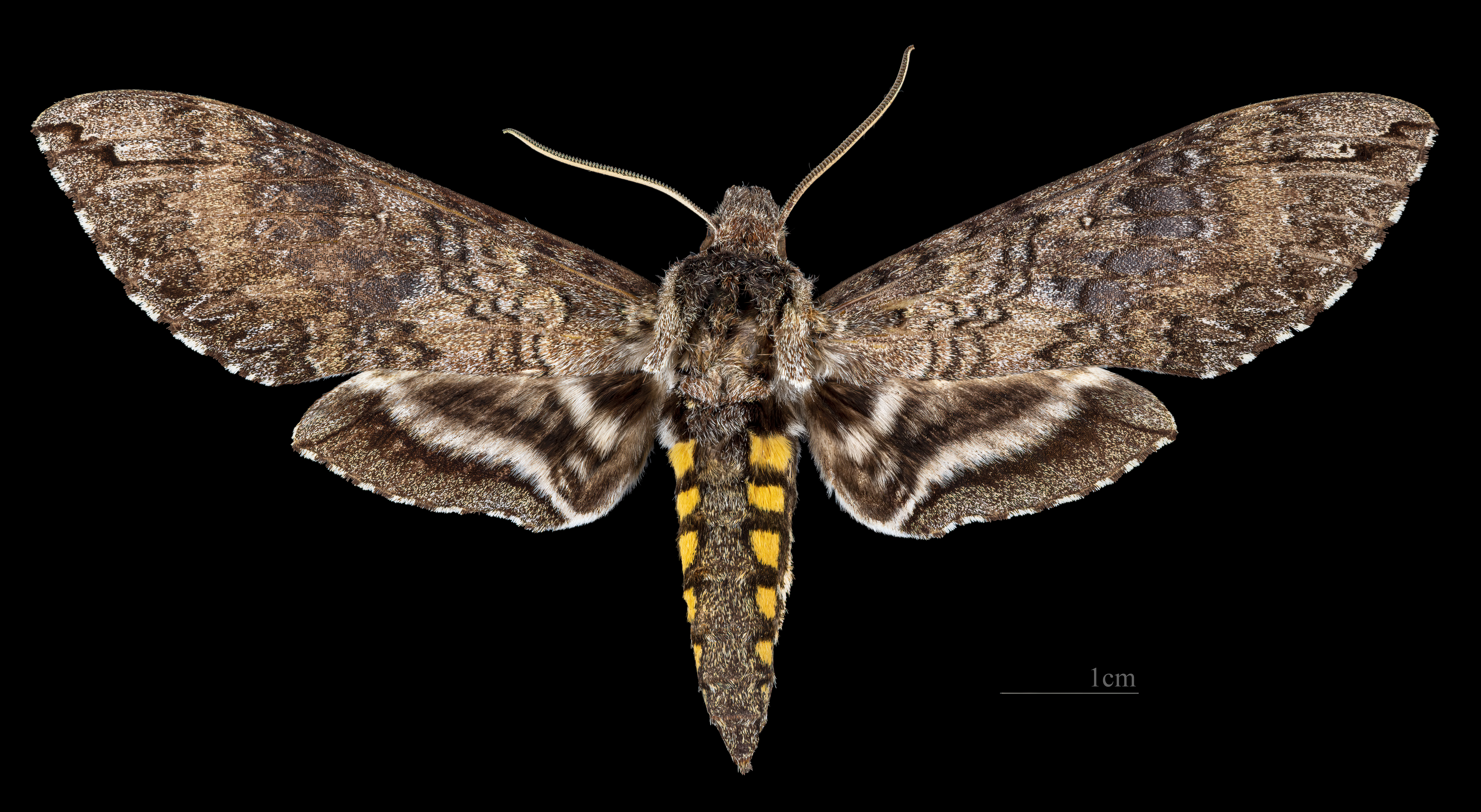
Manduca diffissa petuniae ♂

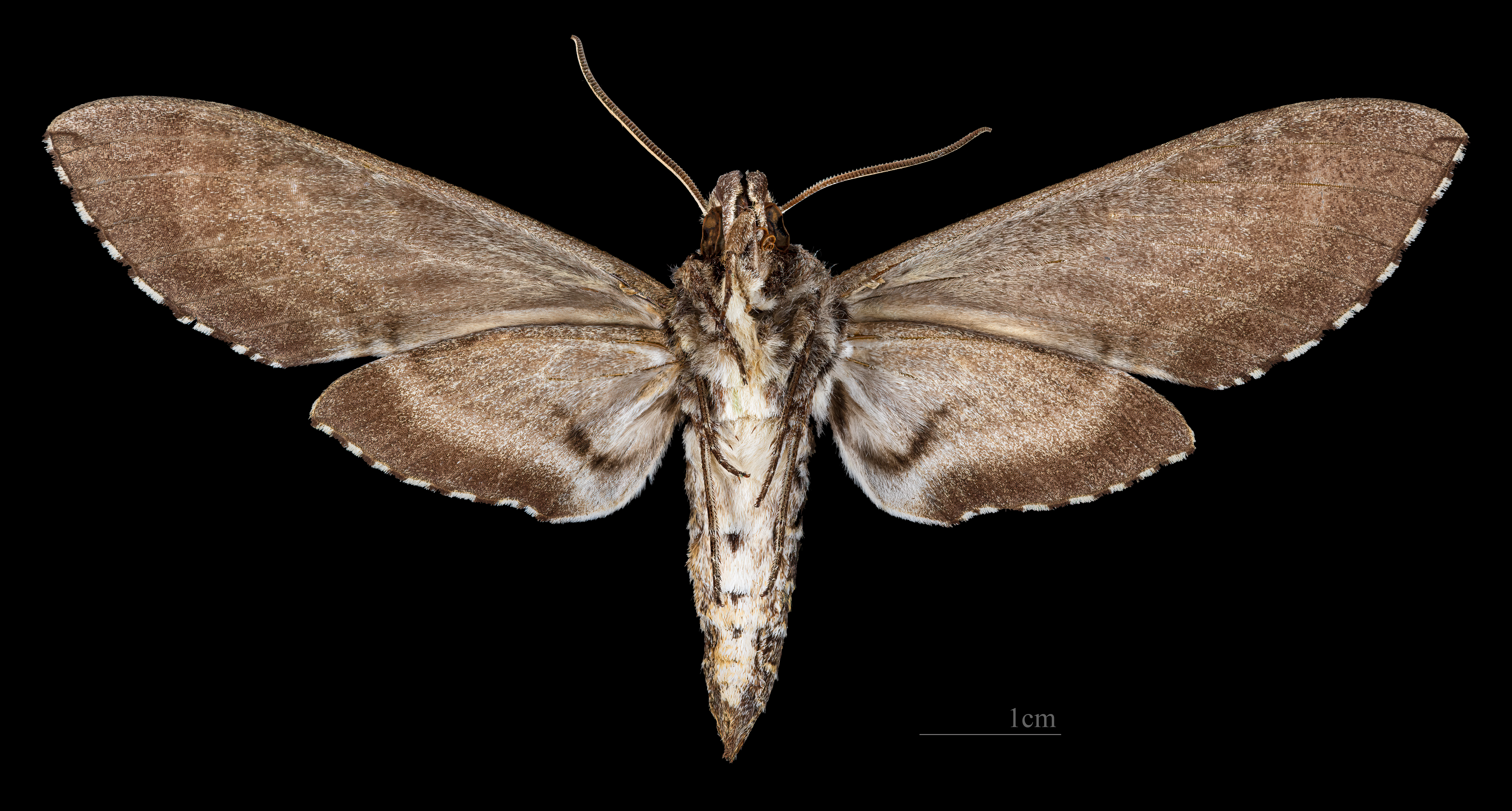
Manduca diffissa petuniae ♂ △

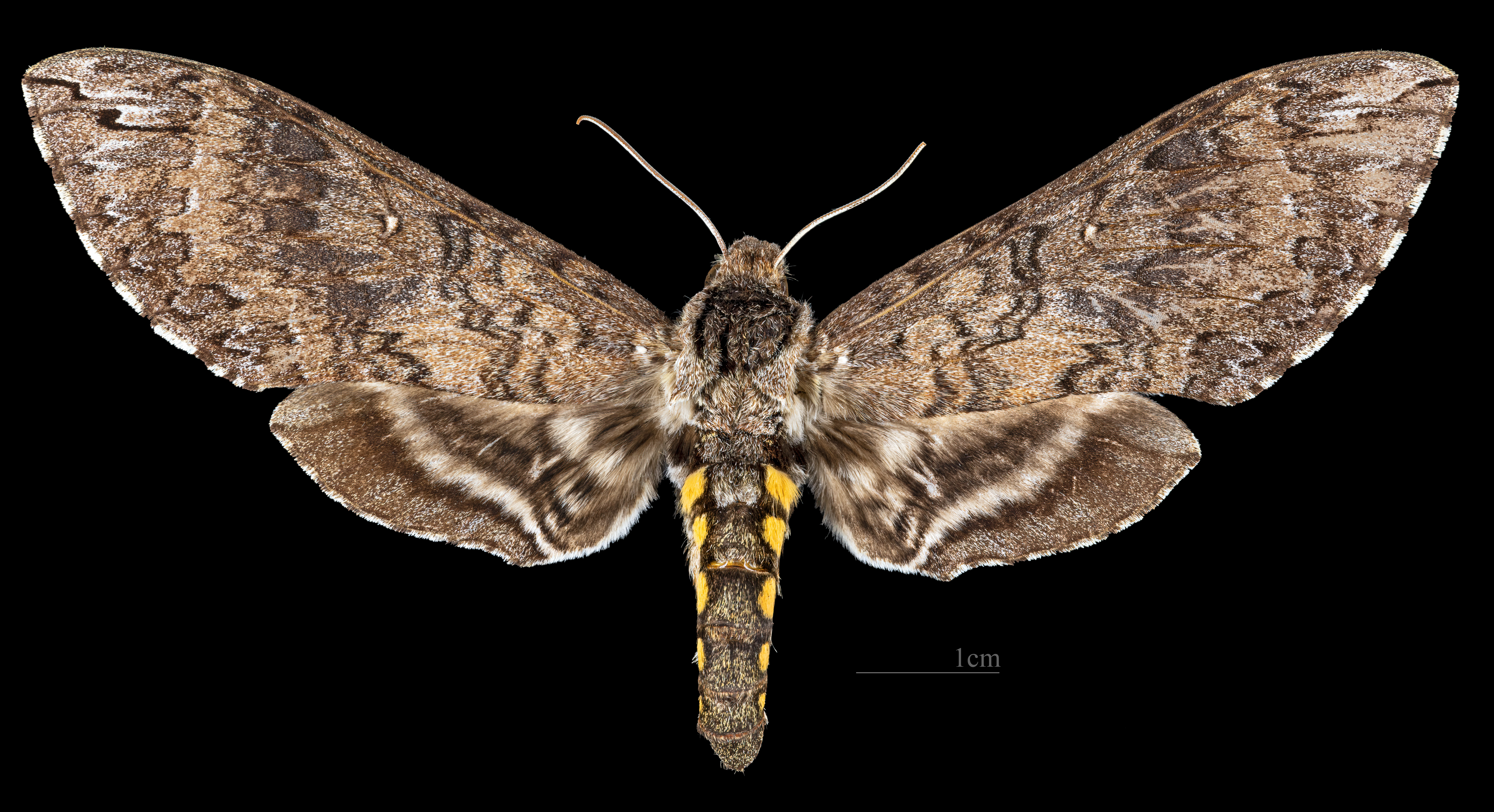
Manduca diffissa petuniae ♀

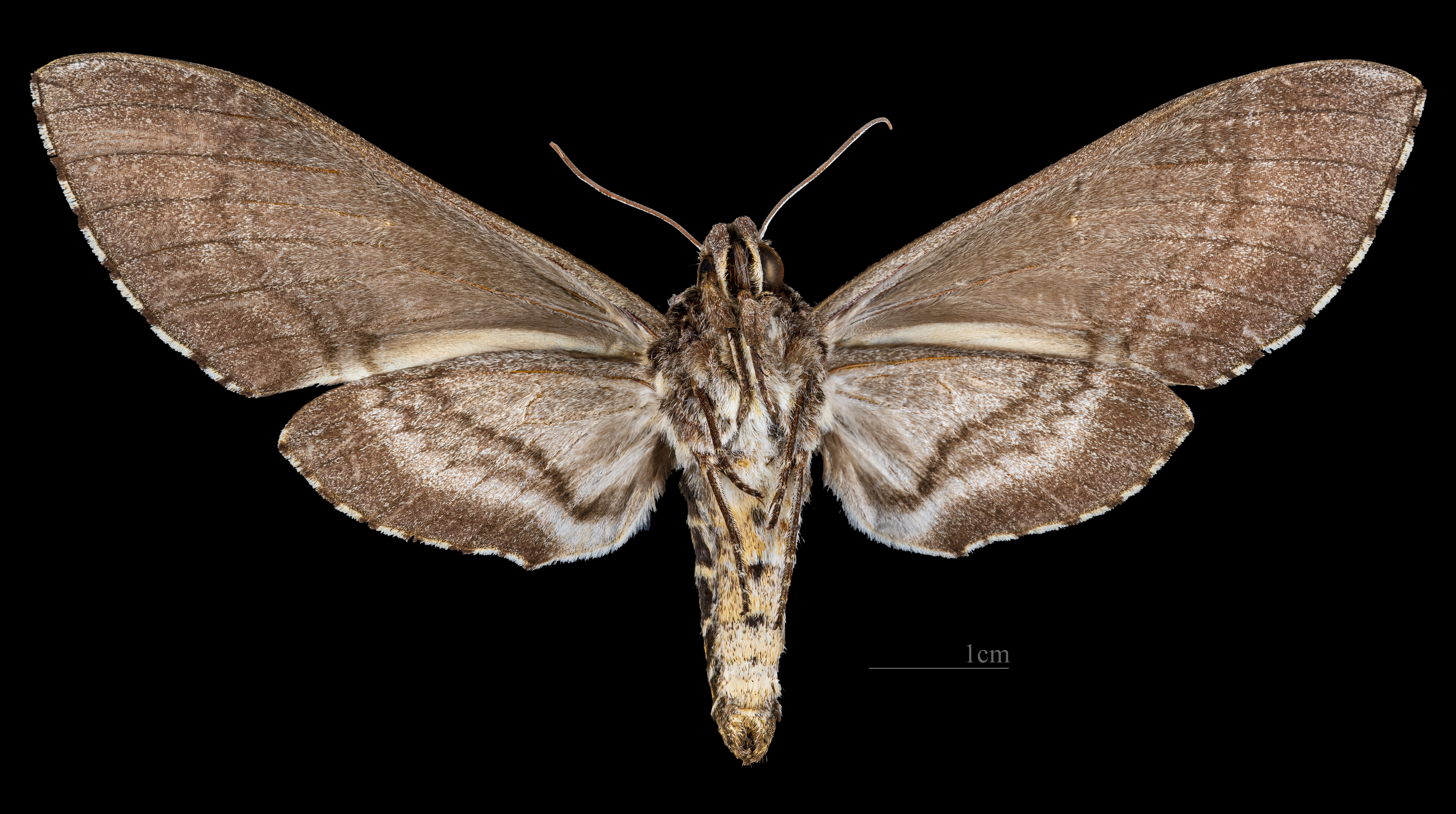
Manduca diffissa petuniae ♀ △
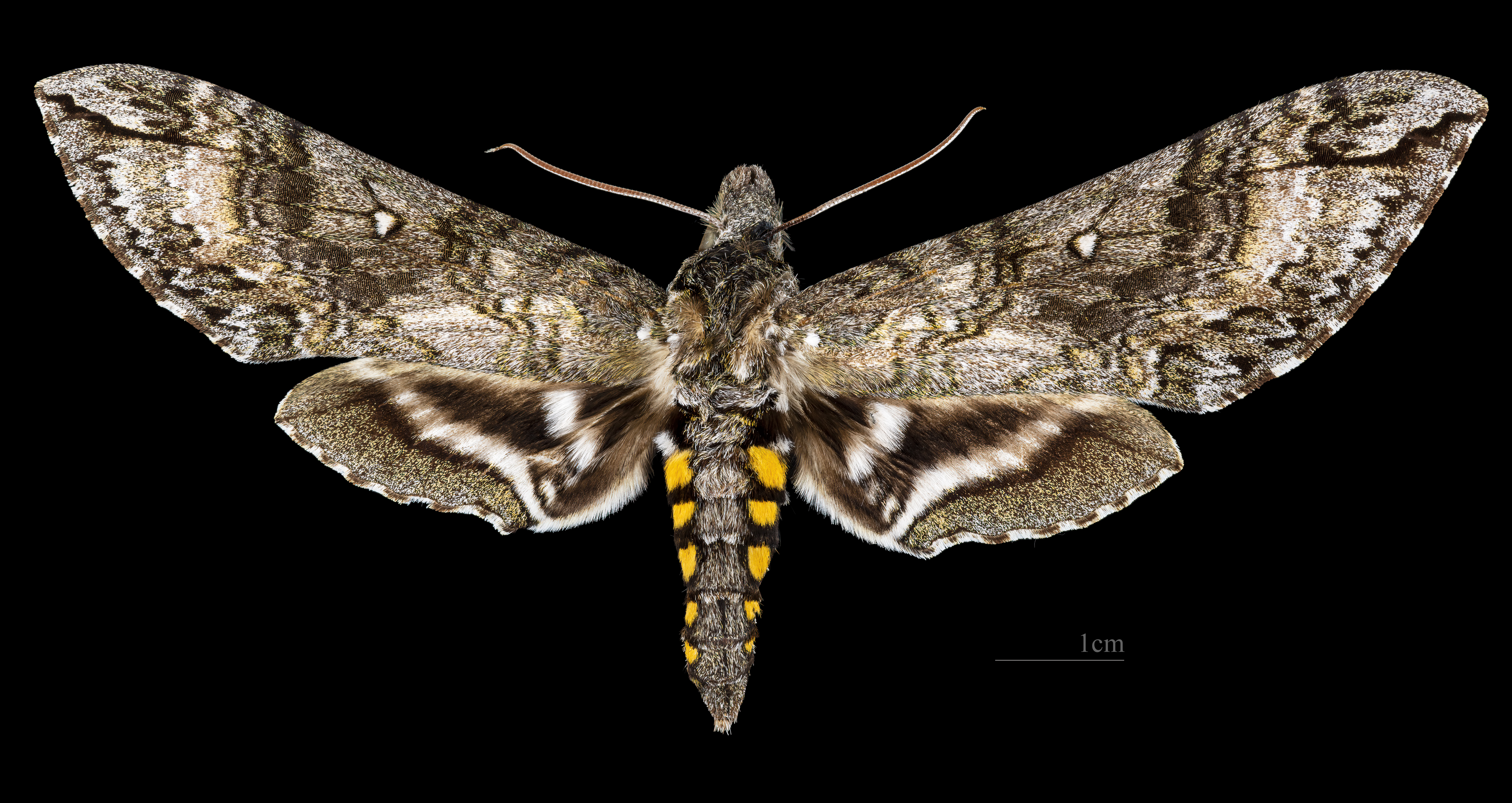
Manduca diffissa zischkai ♂

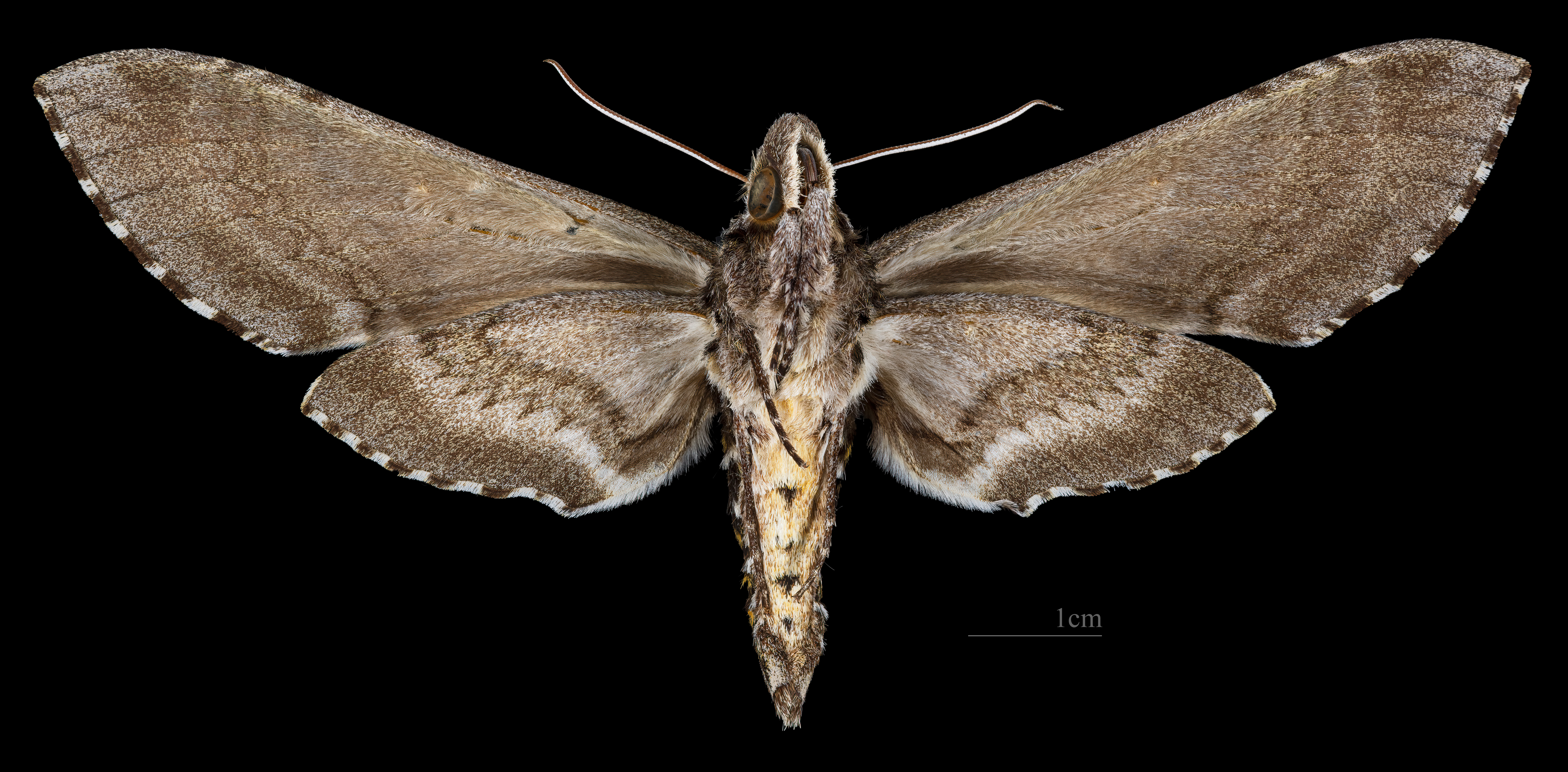
Manduca diffissa zischkai ♂ △
