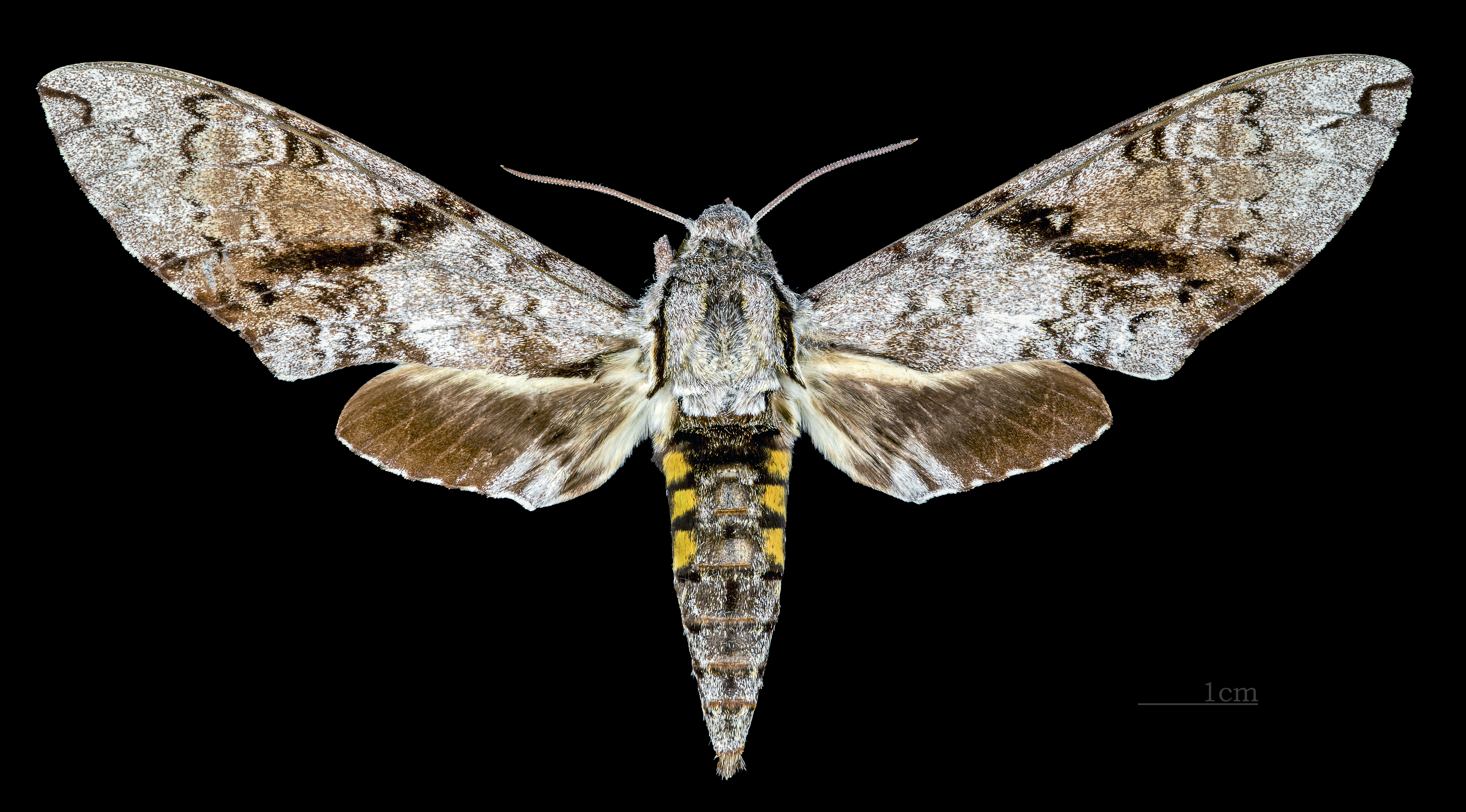
- Dorsal view
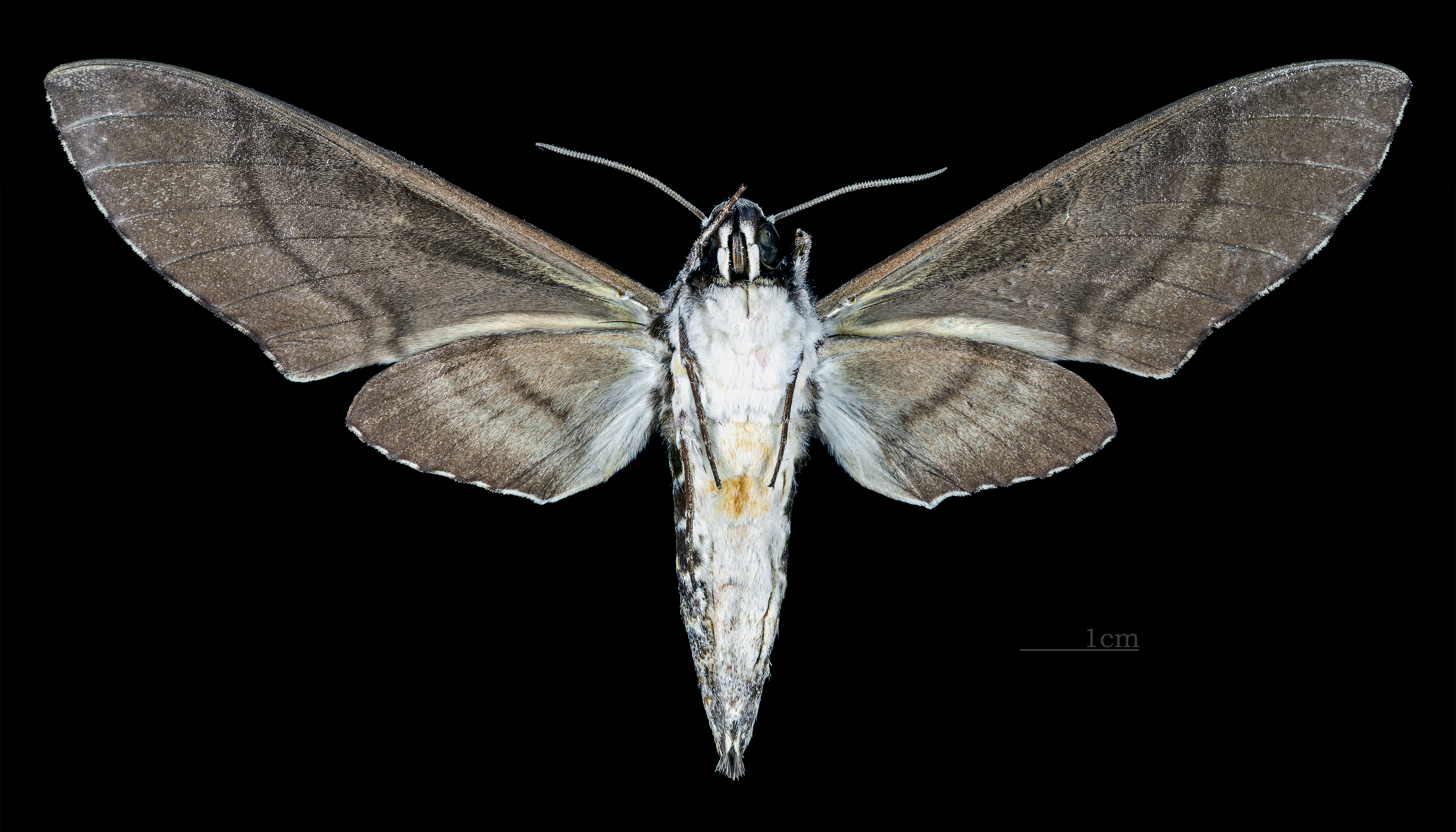
- Ventral view

Scientific classification
- Kingdom: Animalia
- Phylum: Arthropoda
- Class: Insecta
- Order: Lepidoptera
- Family: Sphingidae
- Genus: Manduca
- Species: M. andicola

Binomial name
- Manduca andicola (Rothschild & Jordan, 1916)

Synonyms
- Protoparce andicola Rothschild & Jordan, 1916; Protoparce andicola nigrescens (Closs, 1916)

= Manduca andicola =

Species of moth

Manduca andicola is a moth of the family Sphingidae first described by Walter Rothschild and Karl Jordan in 1916. It is found from Central America to Peru, Ecuador, Bolivia and Argentina.

It is similar to Manduca lefeburii, Manduca incisa and Manduca jasminearum in having a relatively uniform forewing upperside with a conspicuous, rather diffuse dark band running from about midway along the costa to the outer margin and incorporating the discal spot.
