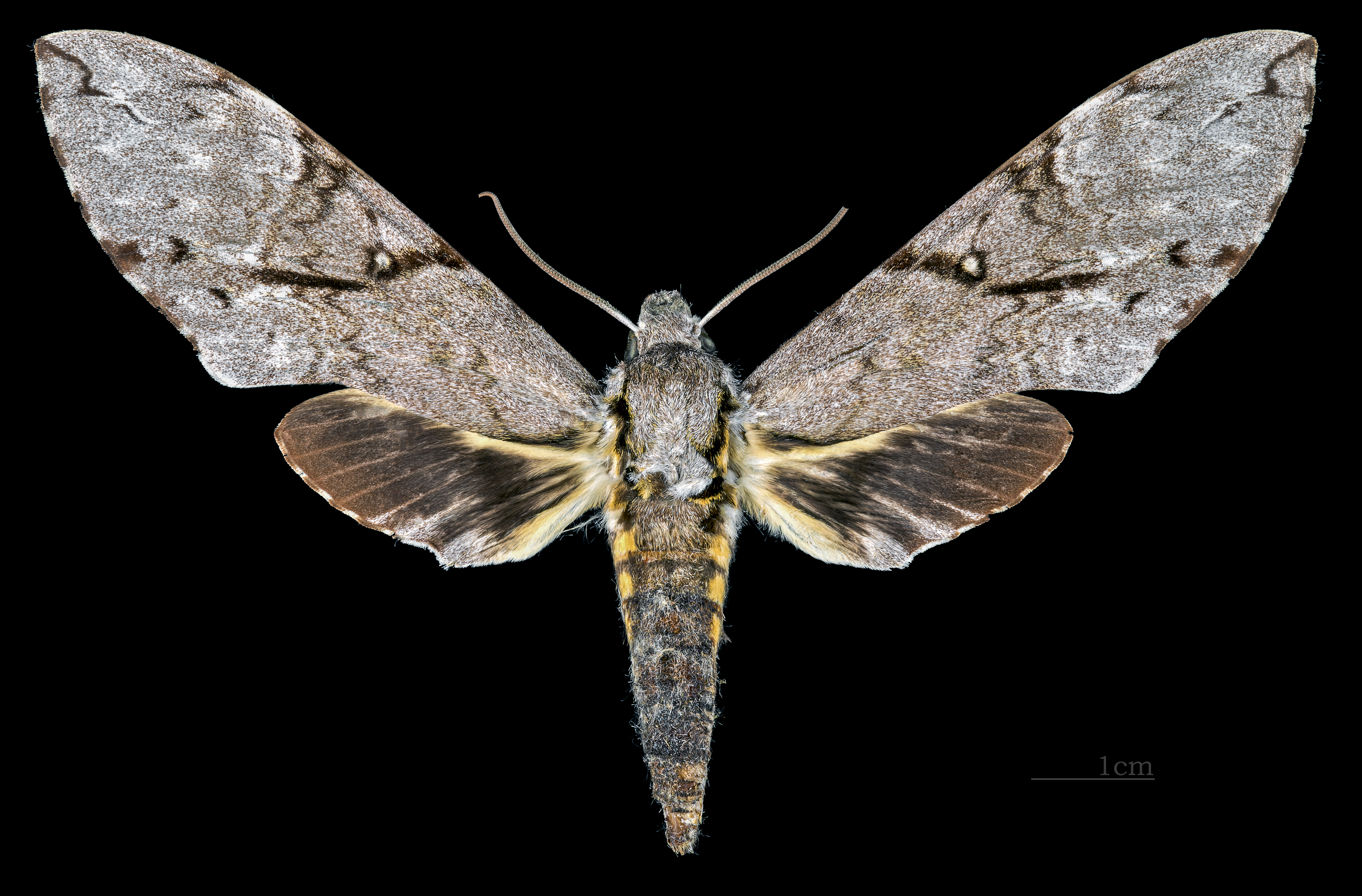
- Manduca prestoni male dorsal
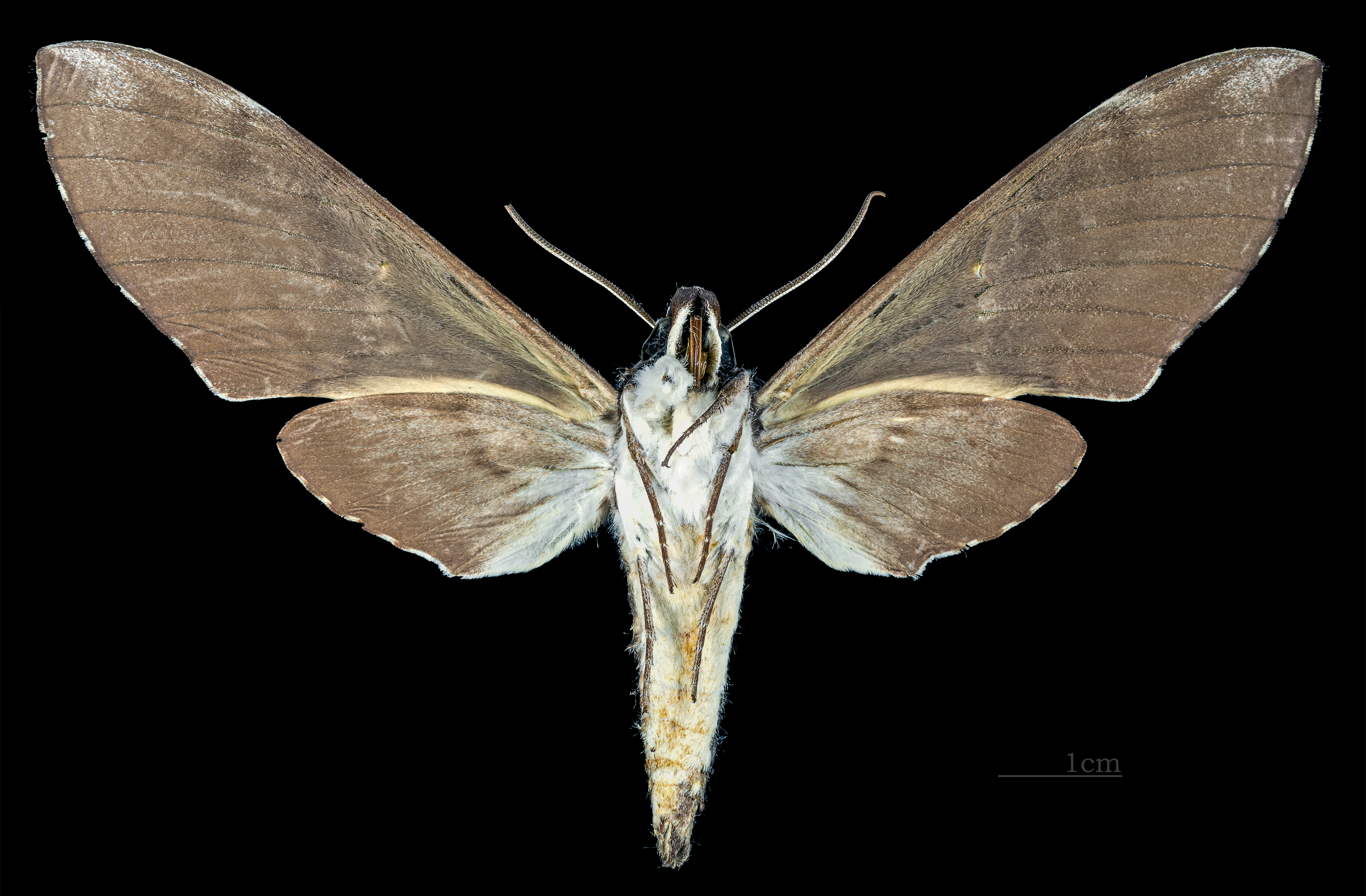
- Manduca prestoni male ventral

Scientific classification
- Kingdom: Animalia
- Phylum: Arthropoda
- Class: Insecta
- Order: Lepidoptera
- Family: Sphingidae
- Genus: Manduca
- Species: M. prestoni

Binomial name
- Manduca prestoni (Gehlen, 1926)

Synonyms
- Protoparce prestoni Gehlen, 1926

= Manduca prestoni =

Species of moth

Manduca prestoni is a moth of the family Sphingidae. It is known from Brazil, Ecuador and Bolivia.

It is similar in appearance to several other members of the genus Manduca, but a number of differences distinguish it from Manduca lefeburii, to which it most closely compares.

Adults have been recorded in October.
