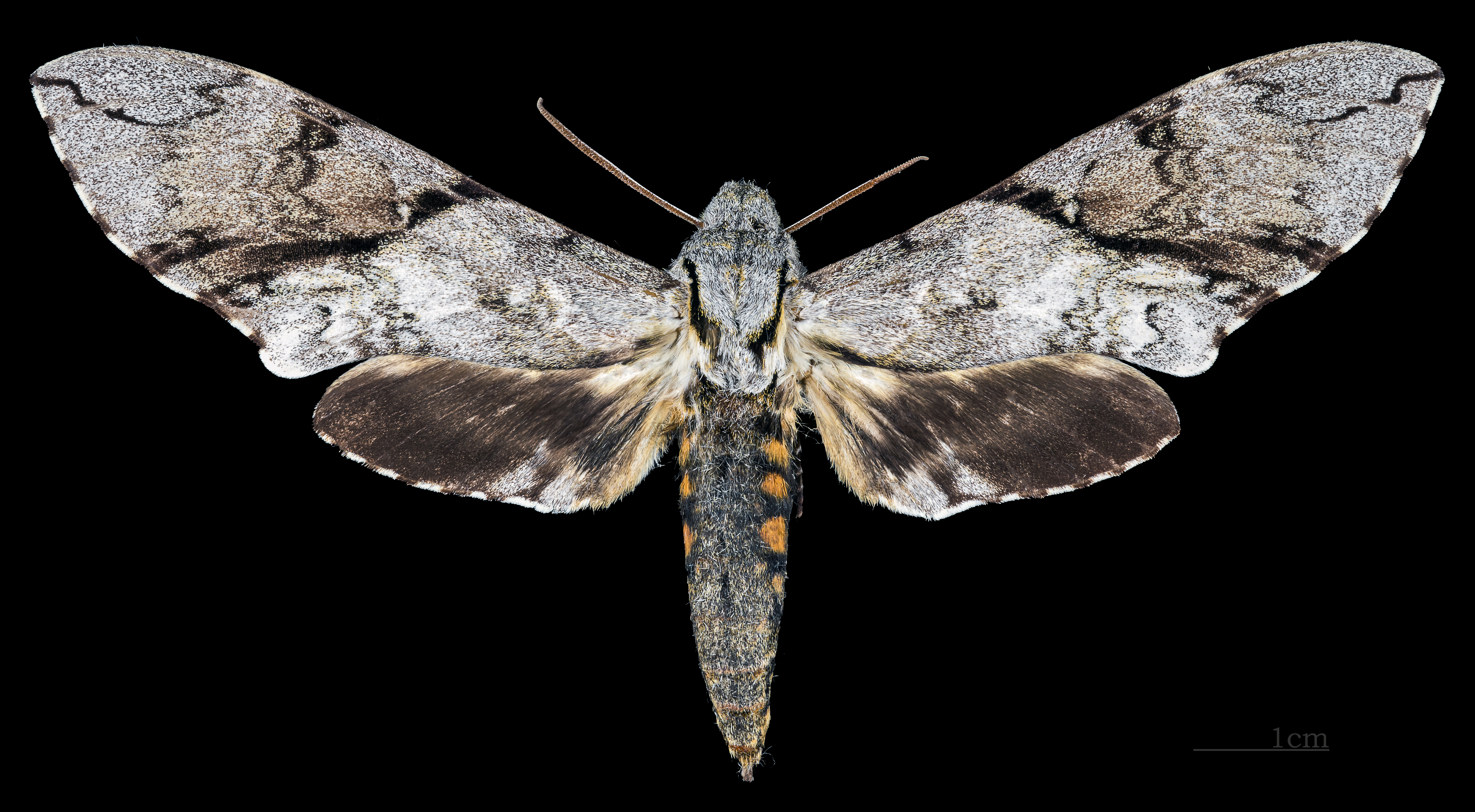
- Manduca incisa male dorsal
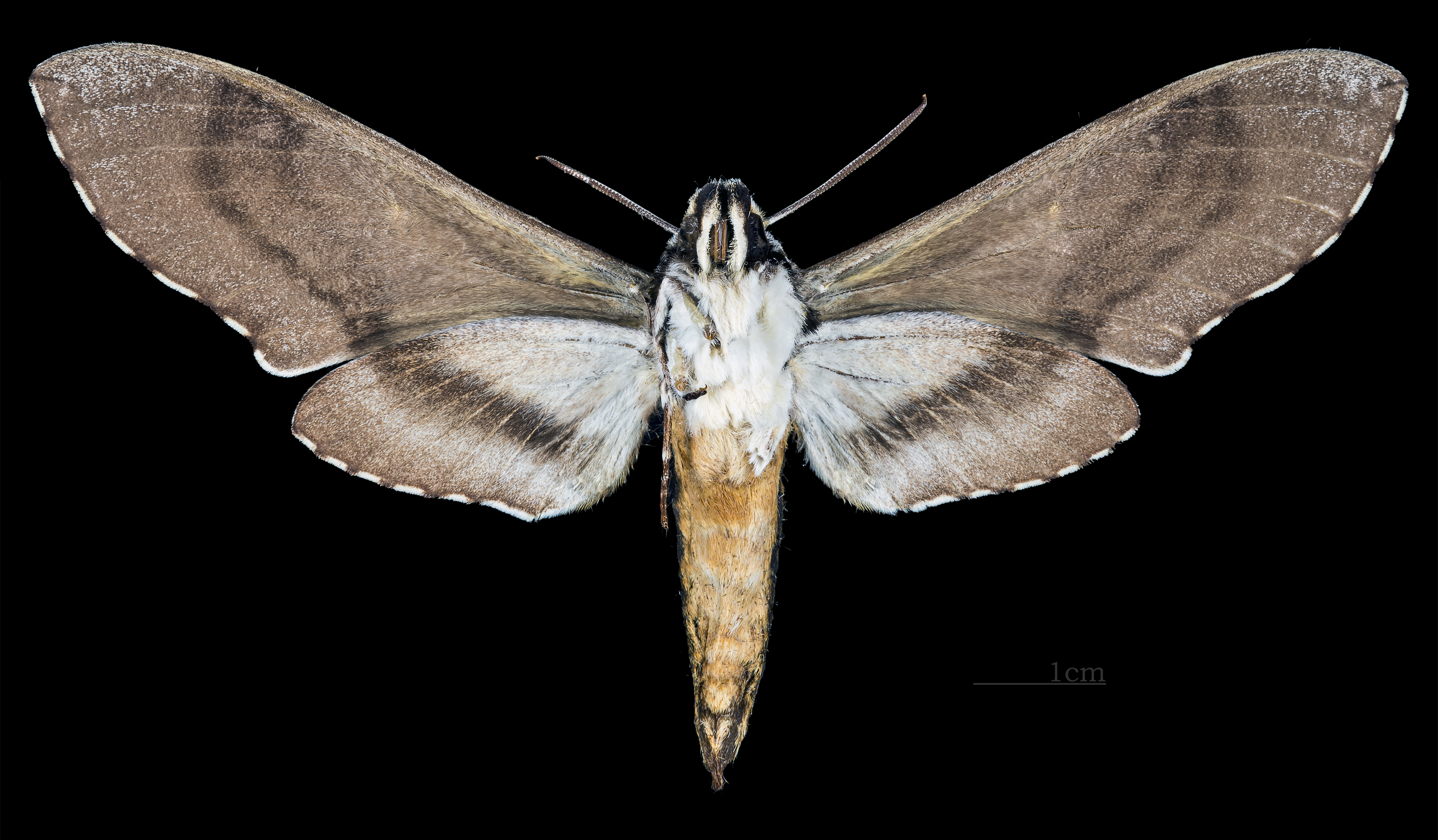
- Manduca incisa male ventral

Scientific classification
- Kingdom: Animalia
- Phylum: Arthropoda
- Class: Insecta
- Order: Lepidoptera
- Family: Sphingidae
- Genus: Manduca
- Species: M. incisa

Binomial name
- Manduca incisa (Walker, 1856)

Synonyms
- Macrosila incisa Walker, 1856

= Manduca incisa =

Species of moth

Manduca incisa is a moth of the family Sphingidae.

== Distribution ==
It is known from Brazil and Bolivia.

== Description ==
It is similar in appearance to several other members of the genus Manduca.

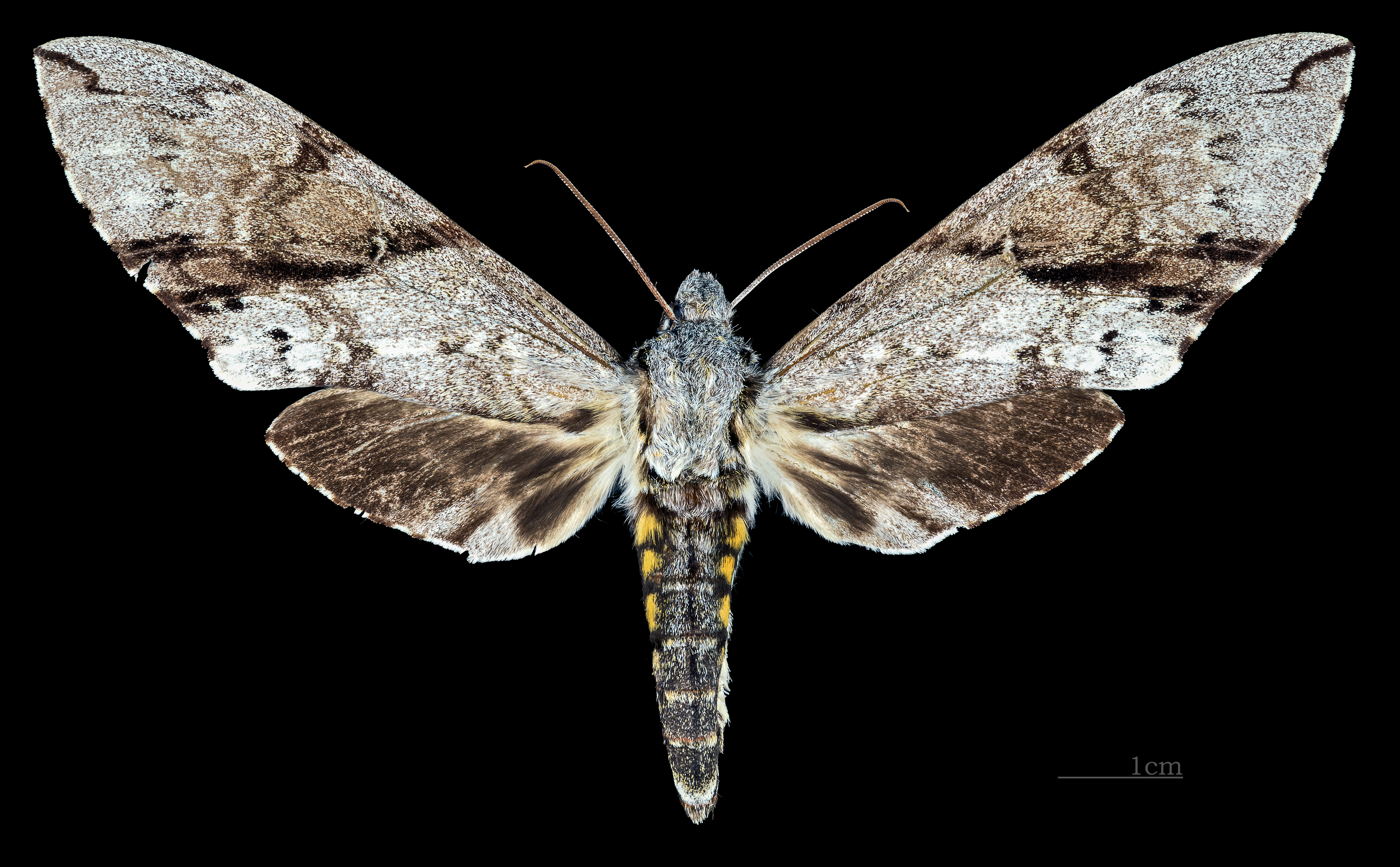
Female - dorsal

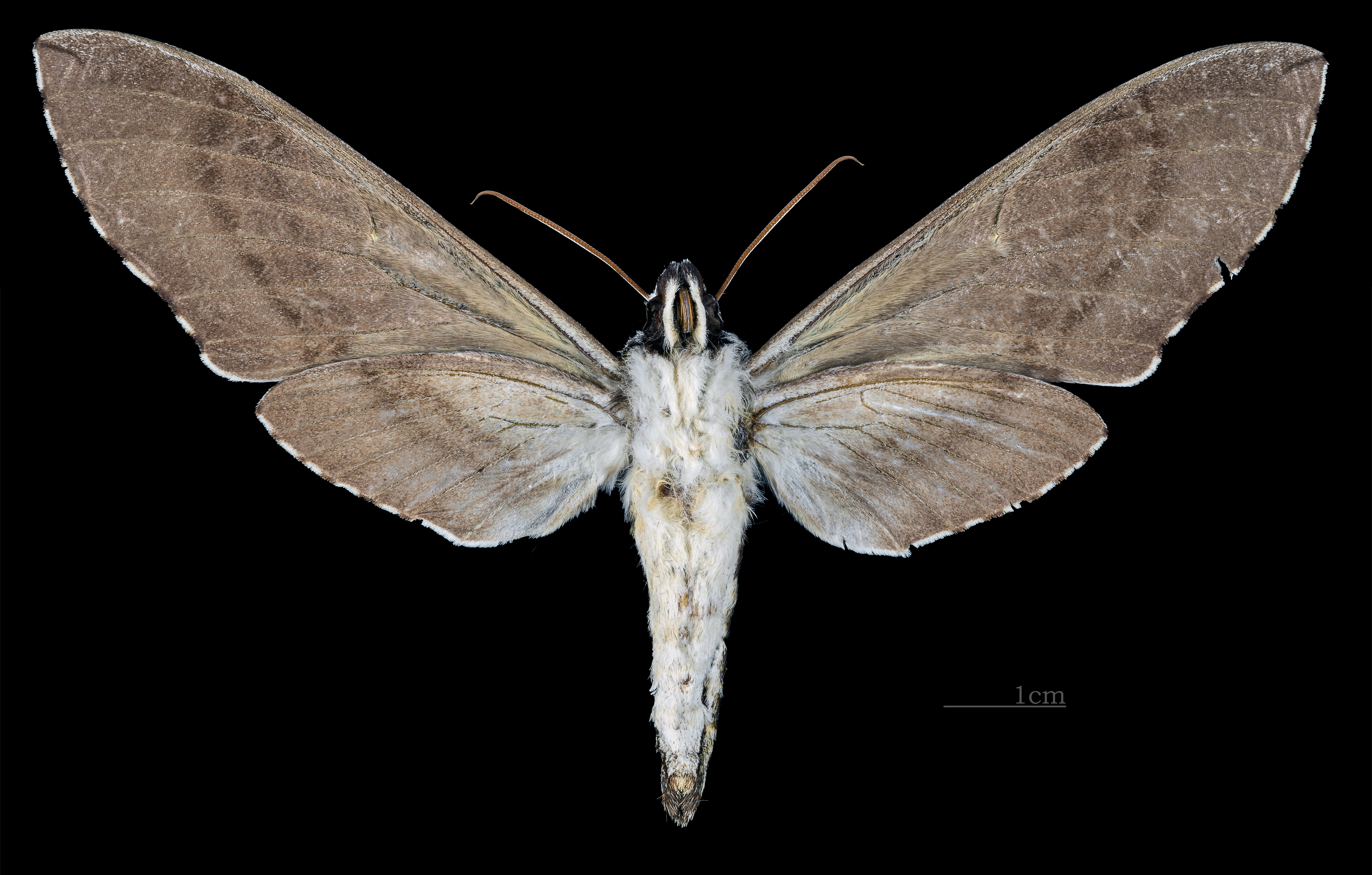
Female - ventral
