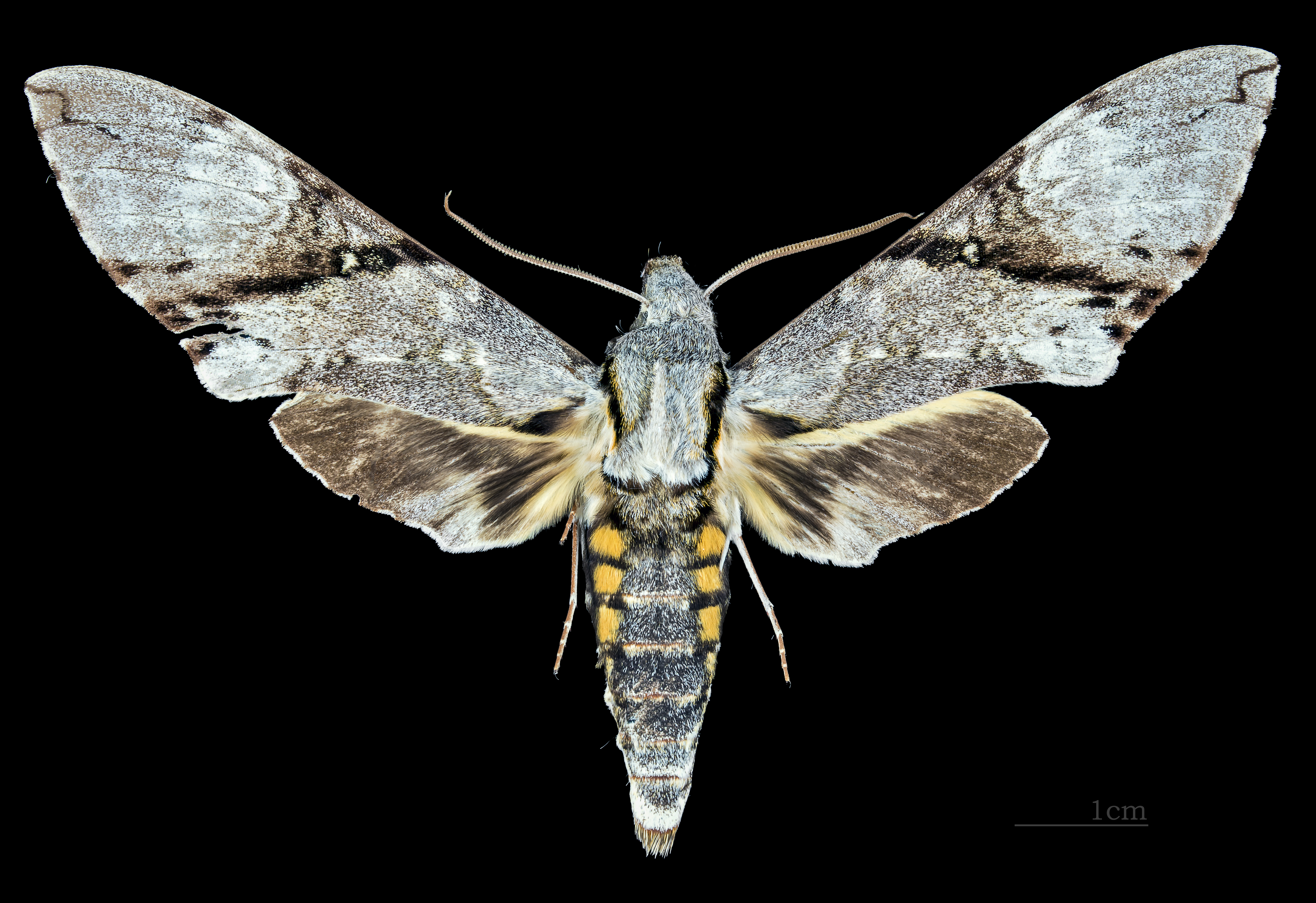
- Manduca lefeburii Male dorsal
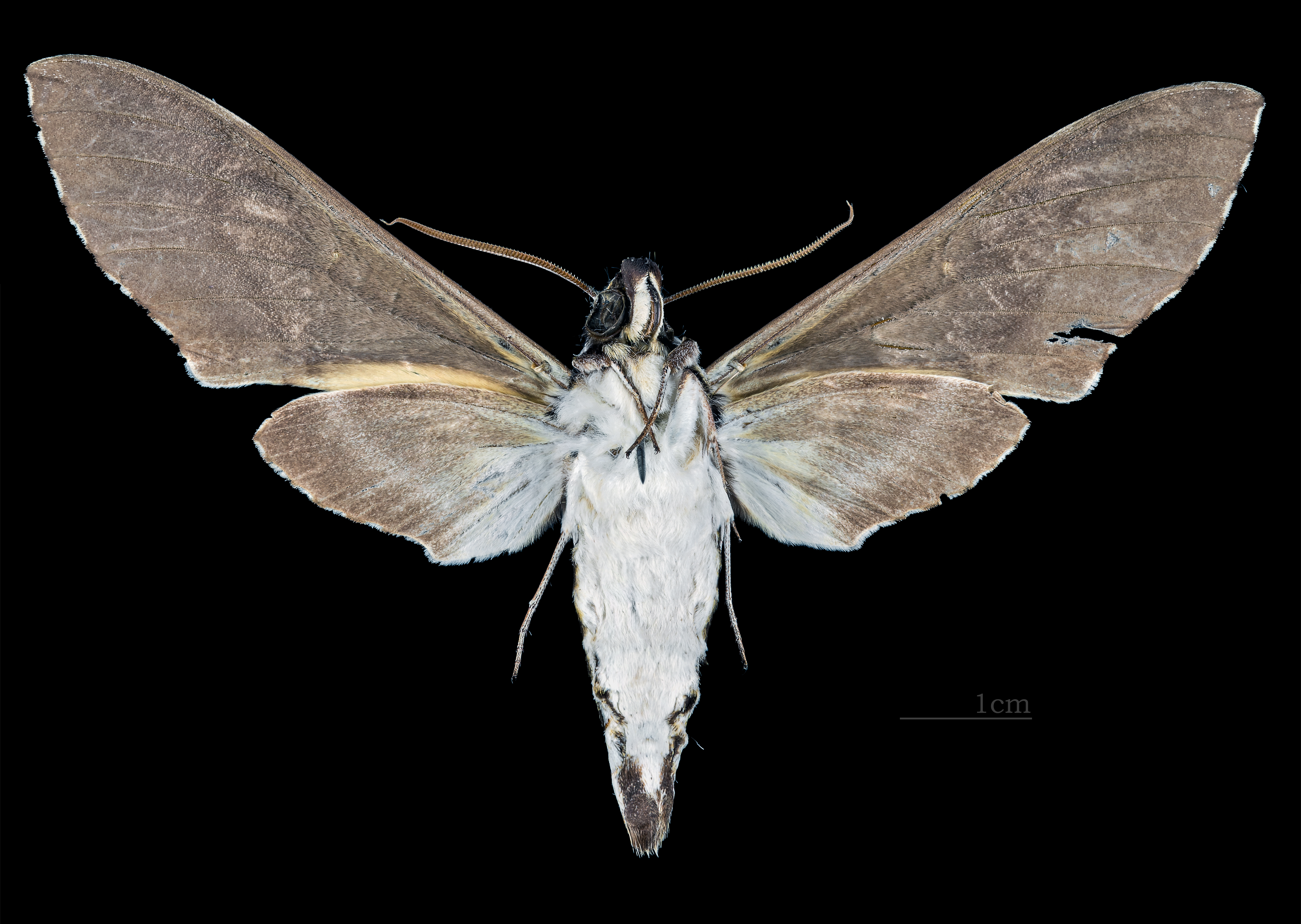
- Manduca lefeburii Male ventral

Scientific classification
- Kingdom: Animalia
- Phylum: Arthropoda
- Class: Insecta
- Order: Lepidoptera
- Family: Sphingidae
- Genus: Manduca
- Species: M. lefeburii

Binomial name
- Manduca lefeburii (Guérin-Méneville, 1844)

Synonyms
- Sphinx lefeburii Guérin-Méneville, 1844; Protoparce lefeburii bossardi Gehlen, 1926

= Manduca lefeburii =

Species of moth

Manduca lefeburii is a moth of the family Sphingidae.

== Distribution ==
It is found from Mexico, Belize, Nicaragua and Costa Rica to Venezuela, Bolivia, Paraguay and Brazil.

== Description ==
The wingspan is 89–110 mm.

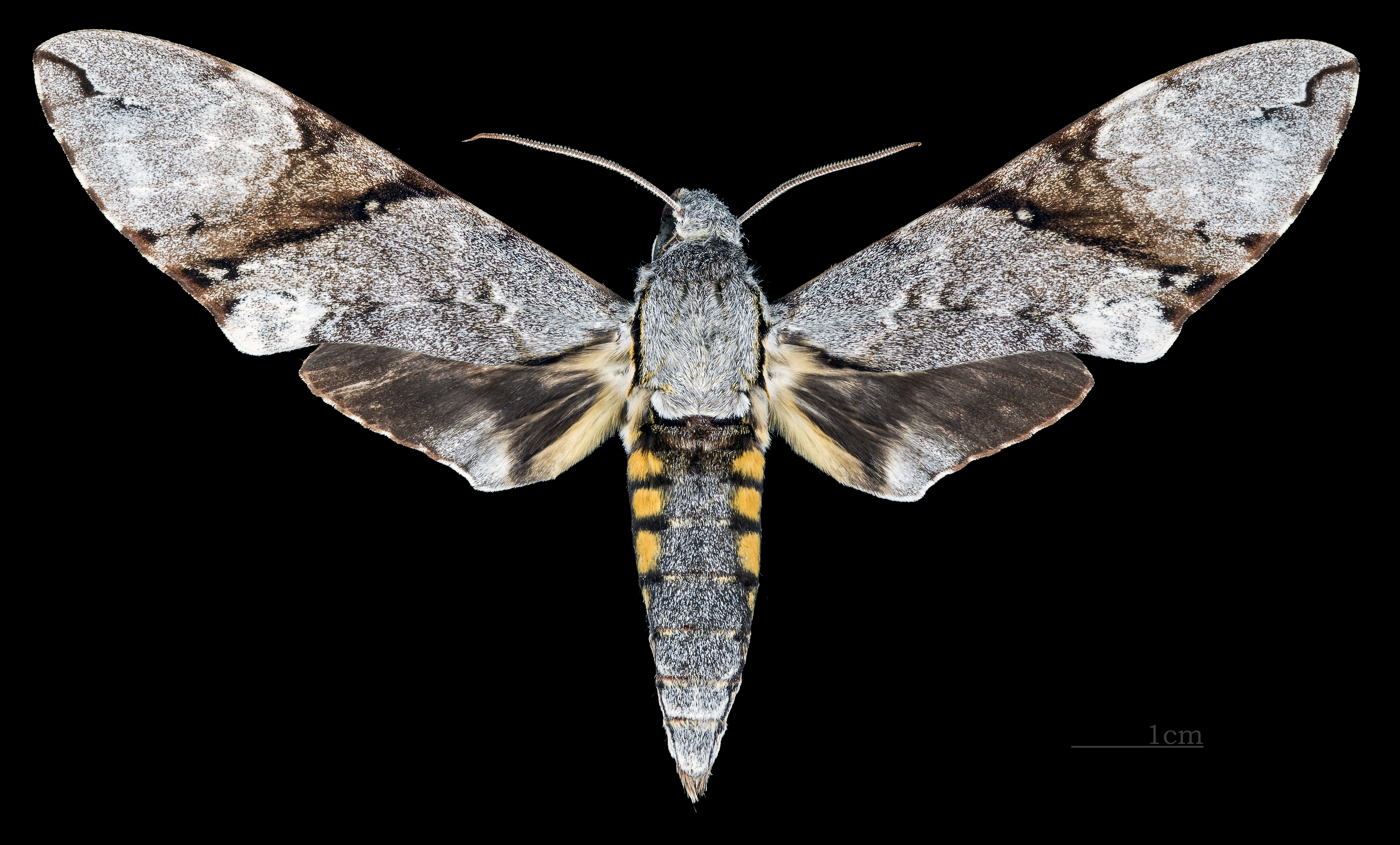
Female dorsal

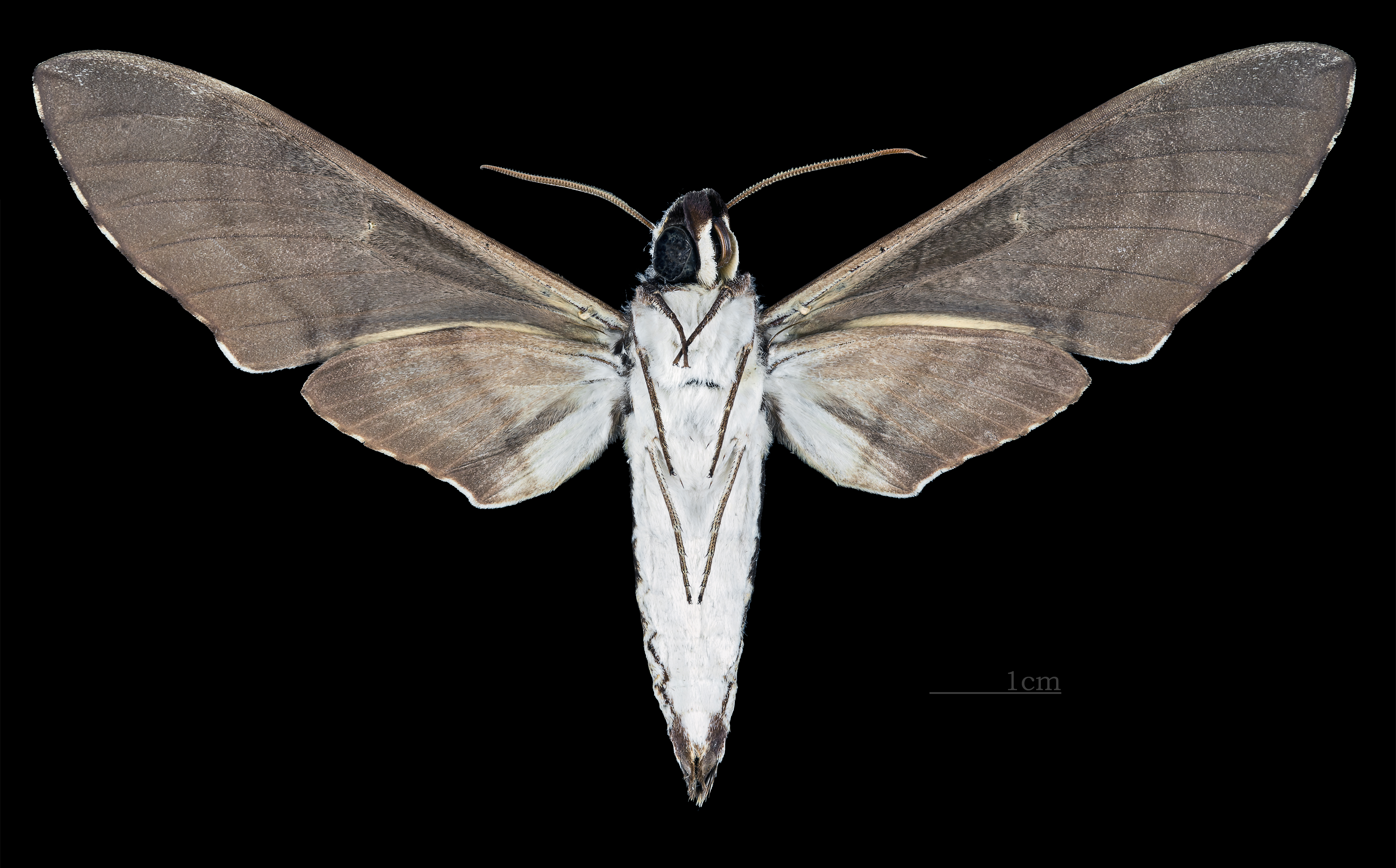
Female ventral

== Biology ==
There are at least two generations per year in Costa Rica with adults on wing from May to June and again from August to December. In Bolivia, adults have been recorded from October to December.

The larvae feed on Casearia arguta, Casearia sylvestris and Casearia corymbosa.

== Subspecies ==
- Manduca lefeburii lefeburii (Mexico, Belize, Nicaragua and Costa Rica to Venezuela, Bolivia, Paraguay and Brazil)
- Manduca lefeburii bossardi (Gehlen, 1926) (Mexico)
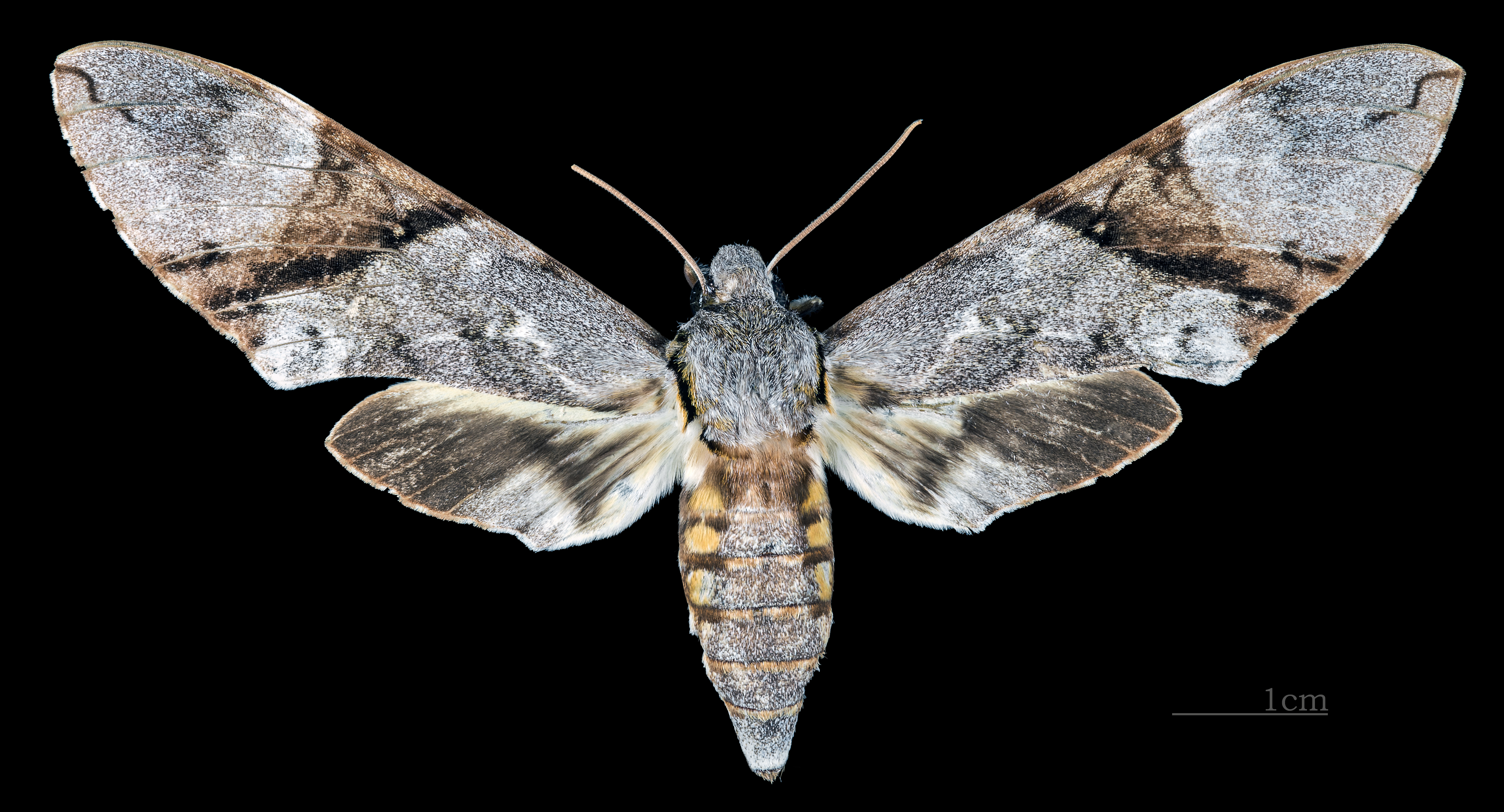
Manduca lefeburii bossardi Dorsal

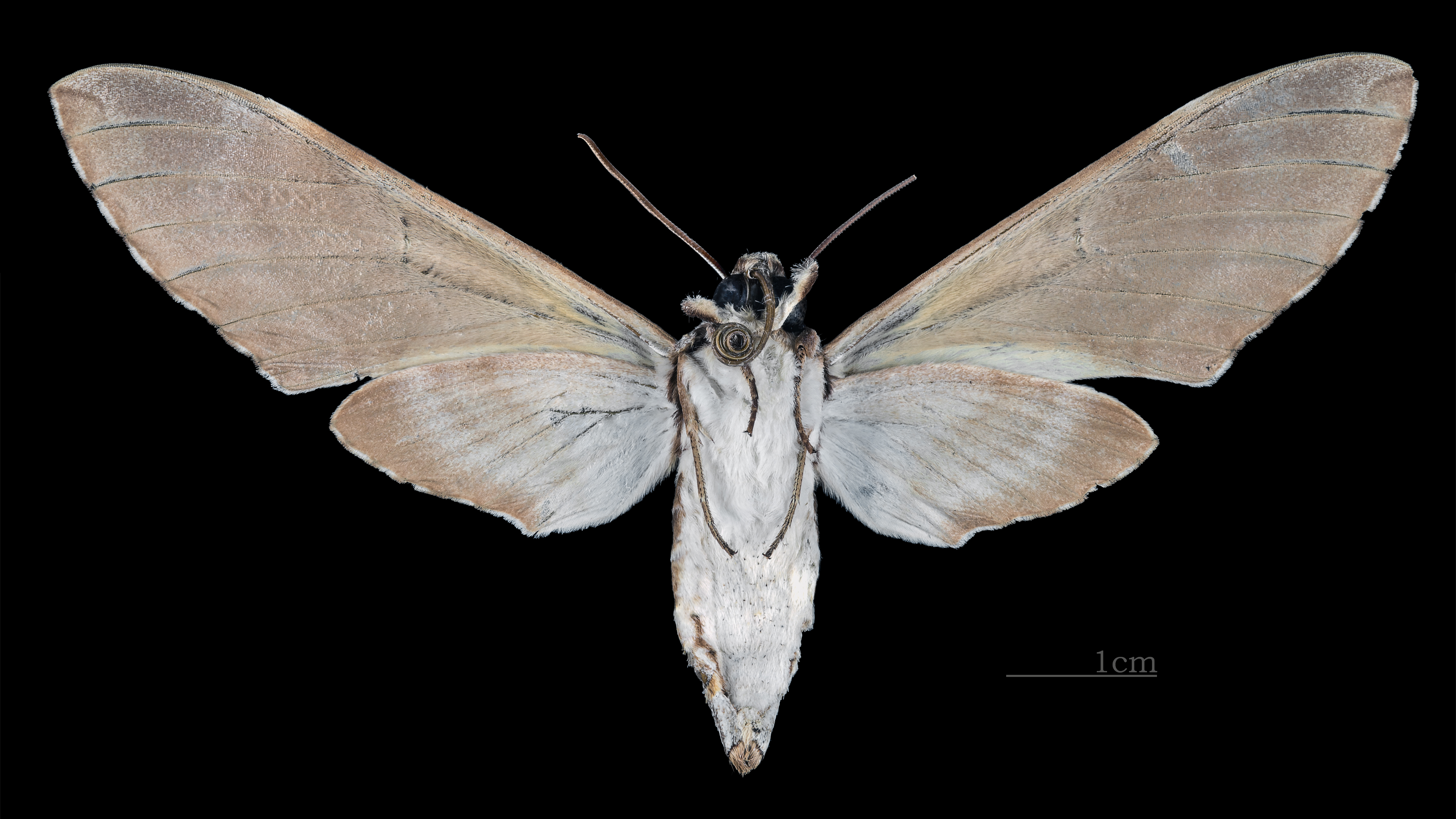
Manduca lefeburii bossardi Ventral
