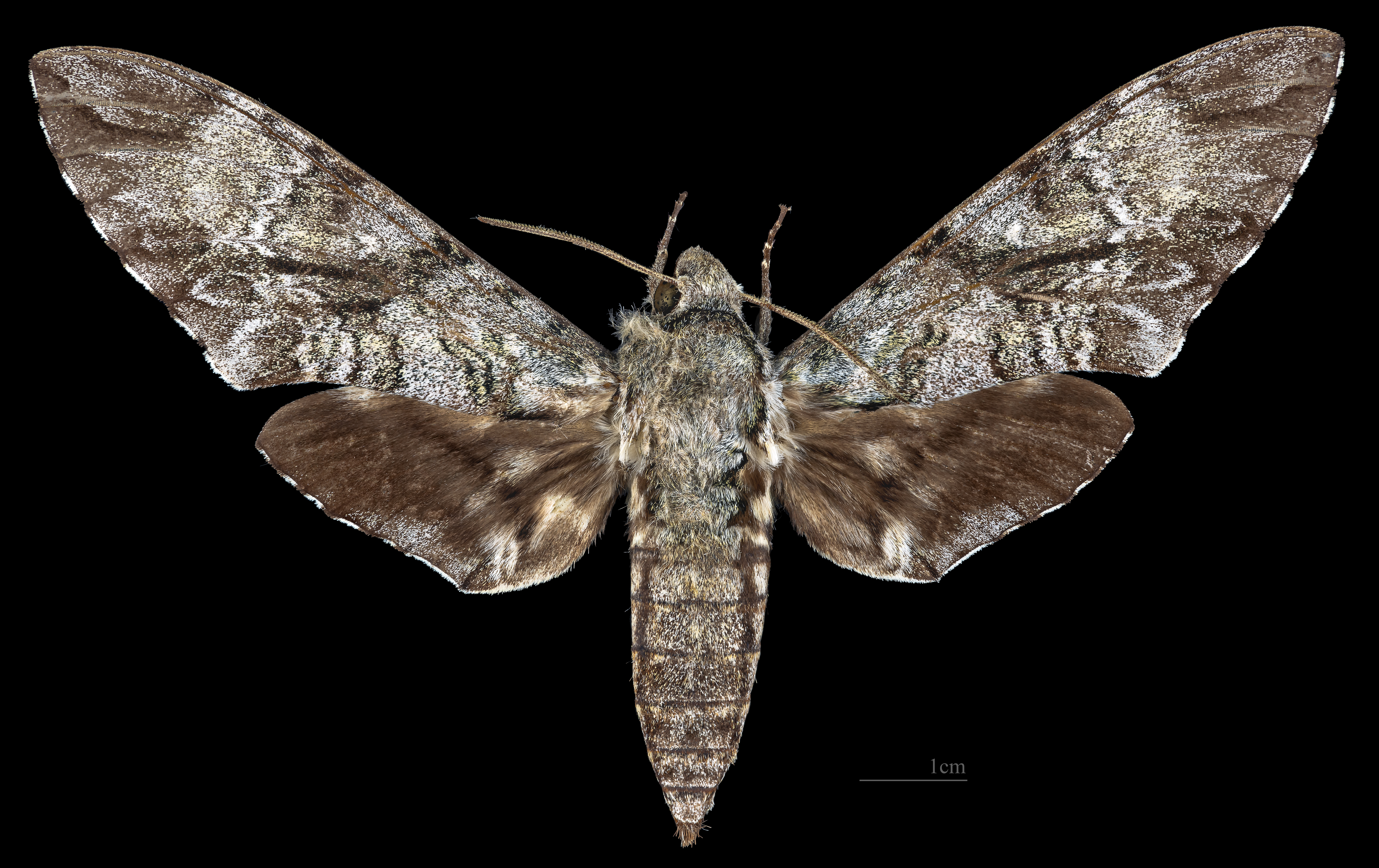
- Male dorsal
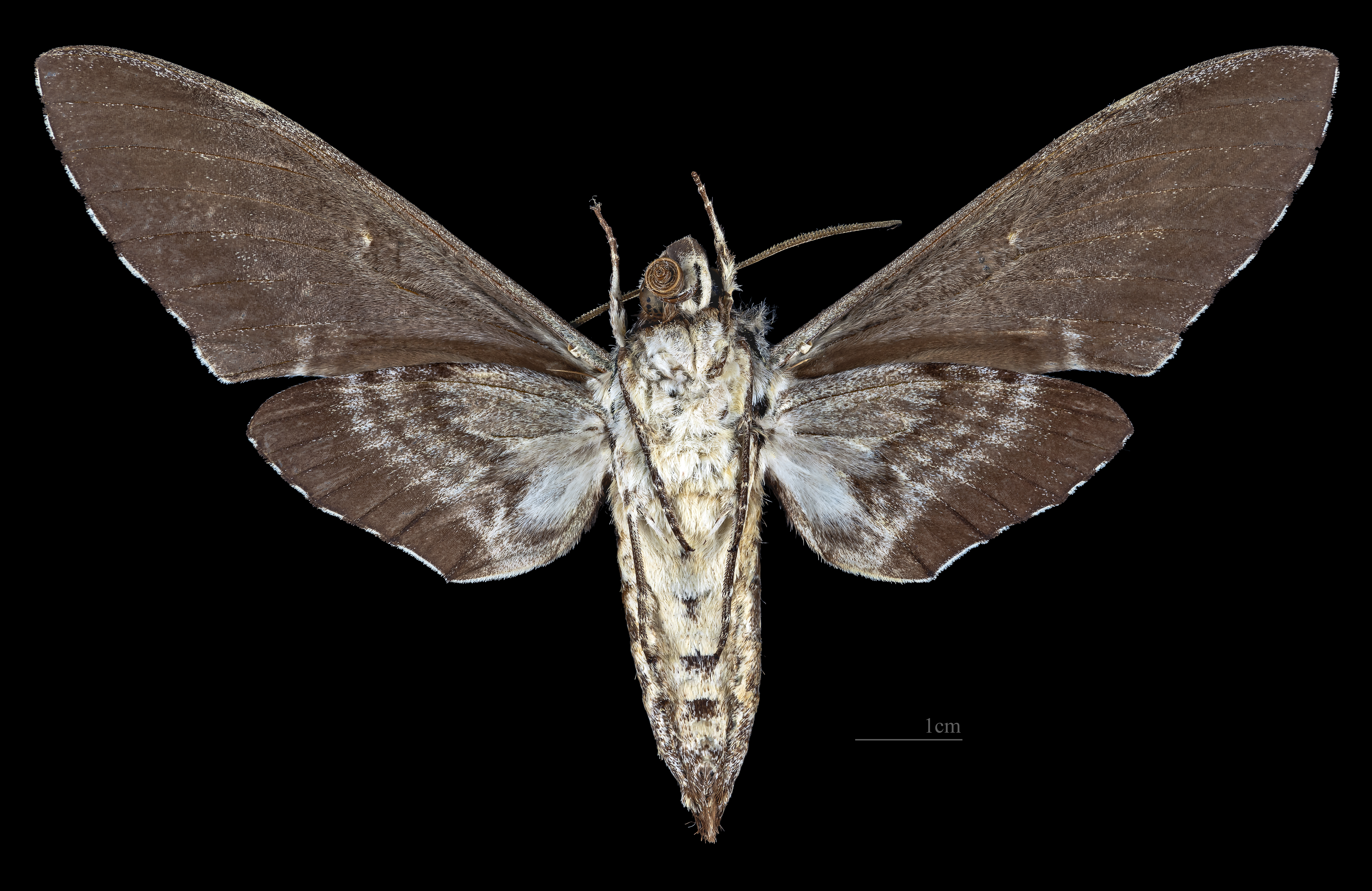
- Male ventral

Scientific classification
- Kingdom: Animalia
- Phylum: Arthropoda
- Class: Insecta
- Order: Lepidoptera
- Family: Sphingidae
- Genus: Manduca
- Species: M. barnesi

Binomial name
- Manduca barnesi (B.P. Clark, 1919)

Synonyms
- Protoparce barnesi Clark, 1919; Phlegethontius holcombi Mooser, 1942; Protoparce florestan ishkal Schaus, 1932

= Manduca barnesi =

Species of moth

Manduca barnesi is a moth of the family Sphingidae.

== Distribution ==
It is found from Guatemala to Costa Rica.

== Description ==
The length of the forewings is about 60 mm. It is similar to Manduca franciscae and Manduca florestan, but longer winged than the latter. The forewing upperside ground colour is white with no discal spot. The markings are generally faint. The forewing underside is unicolorous brown and the marginal black band is very narrow. The fringe is mostly white but brown at the veins. The hindwing upperside is black, but suffused with white toward the anal angle. The hindwing underside is brown, with the basal third heavily suffused with white.

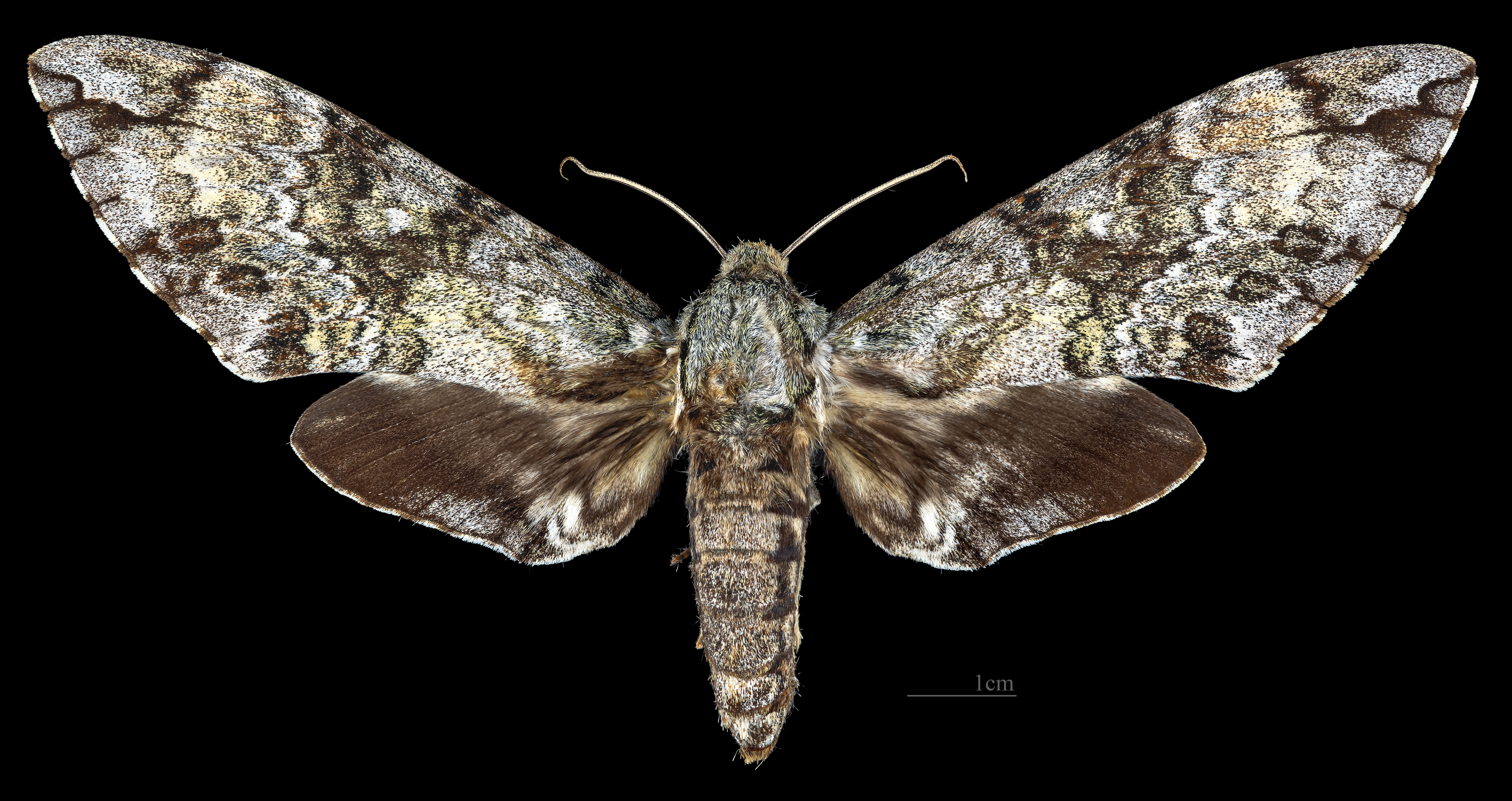
Female dorsal

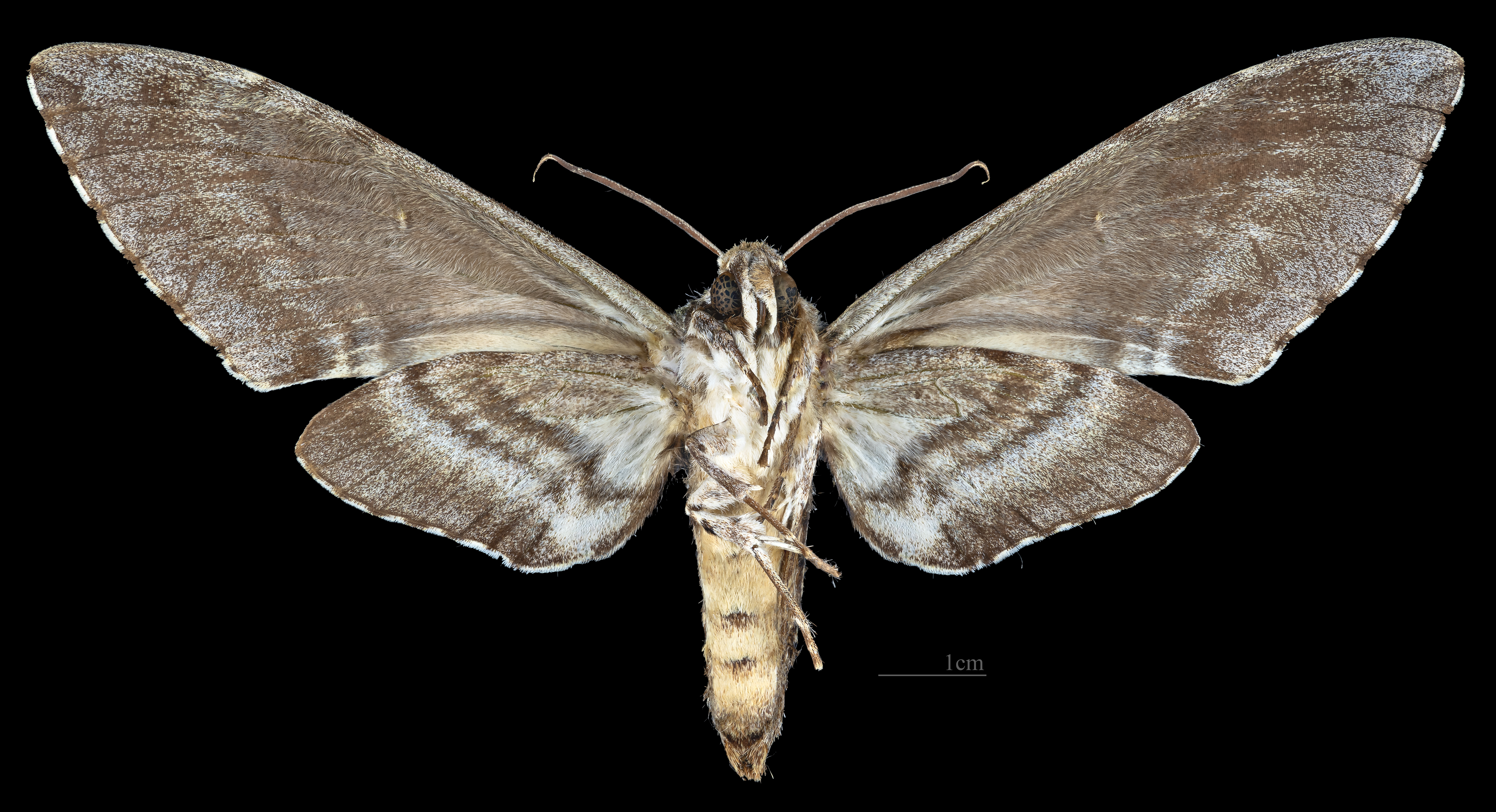
Female ventral

== Biology ==
There are three generations per year in Costa Rica, with adults on wing in January, from May to July, and from September to November.
