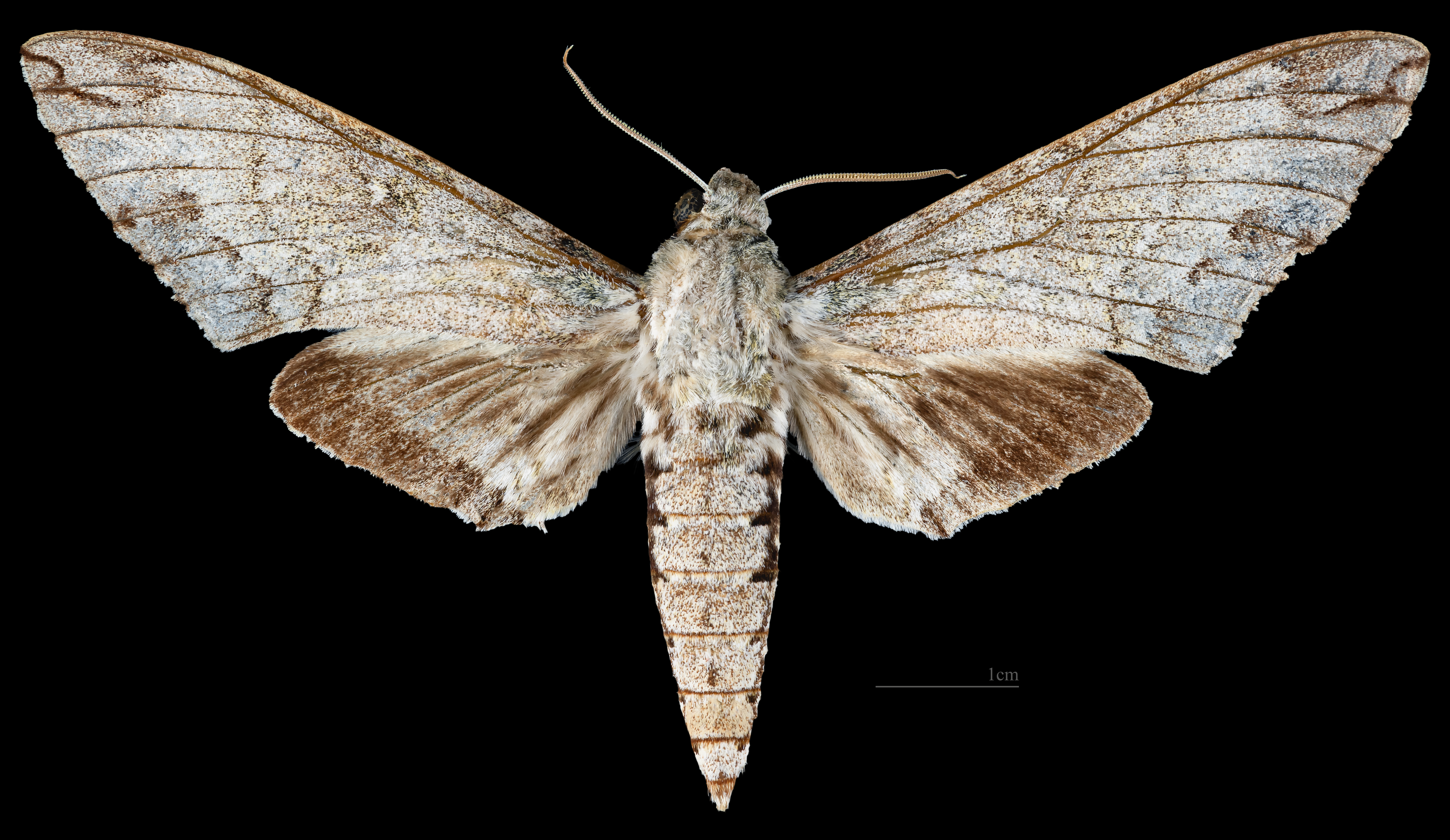
- Male dorsal
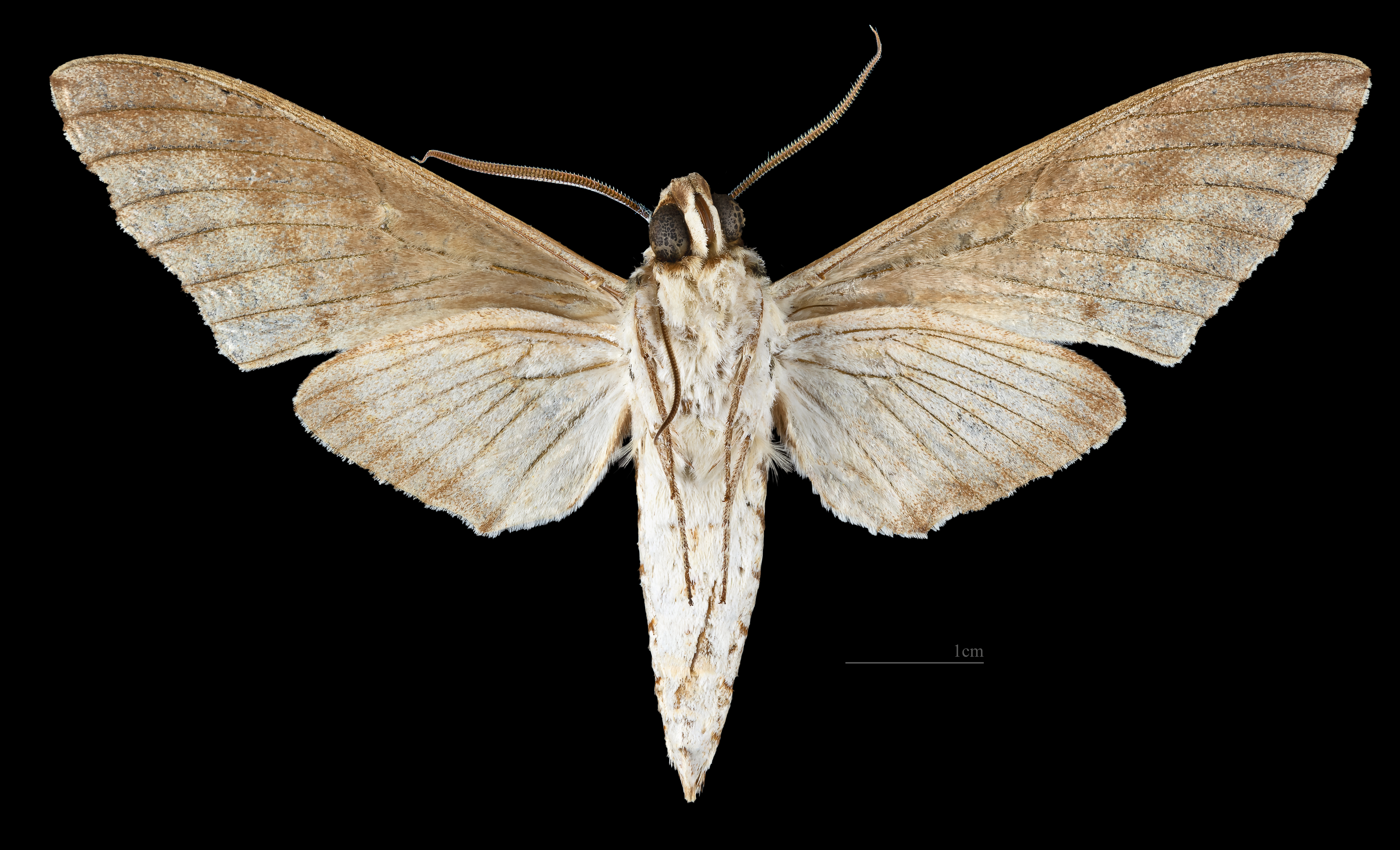
- Male ventral

Scientific classification
- Kingdom: Animalia
- Phylum: Arthropoda
- Clade: Pancrustacea
- Class: Insecta
- Order: Lepidoptera
- Family: Sphingidae
- Genus: Manduca
- Species: M. franciscae

Binomial name
- Manduca franciscae (B.P Clark, 1916)

Synonyms
- Protoparce franciscae Clark, 1916

= Manduca franciscae =

Species of moth

Manduca franciscae is a moth of the family Sphingidae.

== Distribution ==
It is known from Venezuela.

== Description ==
The length of the forewings is 42–47 mm for males and about 55 mm for females. It is similar in appearance to several other members of the genus Manduca, but whiter than any other species in the genus with the exception of Manduca sexta leucoptera. The forewing underside is light brown, shading to white, the hindwing upperside is brown and the hindwing underside is white, except for the light brown antemedian and submarginal bands. Females are darker and more contrastingly patterned than males.

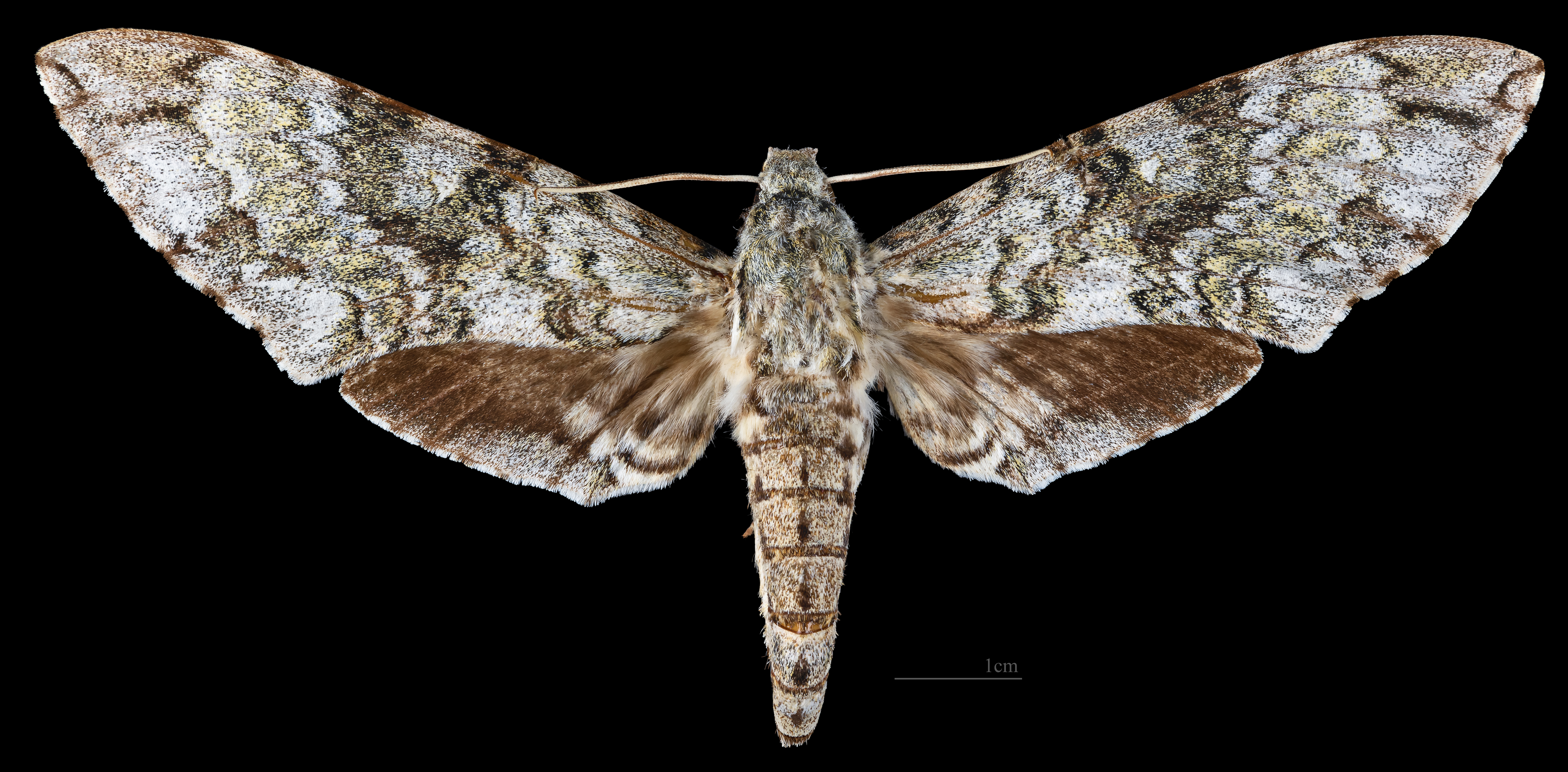
Female dorsal

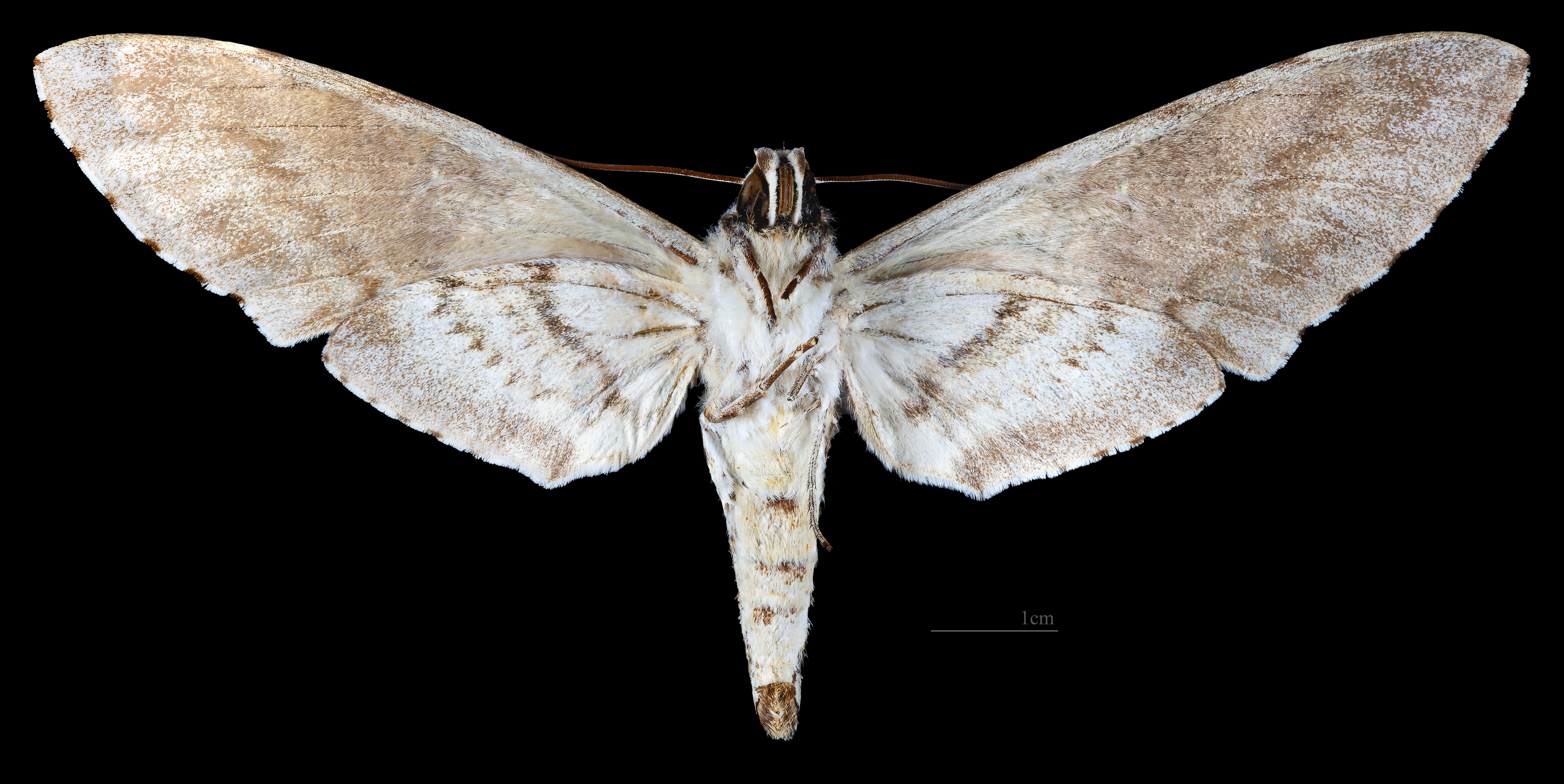
Female ventral
