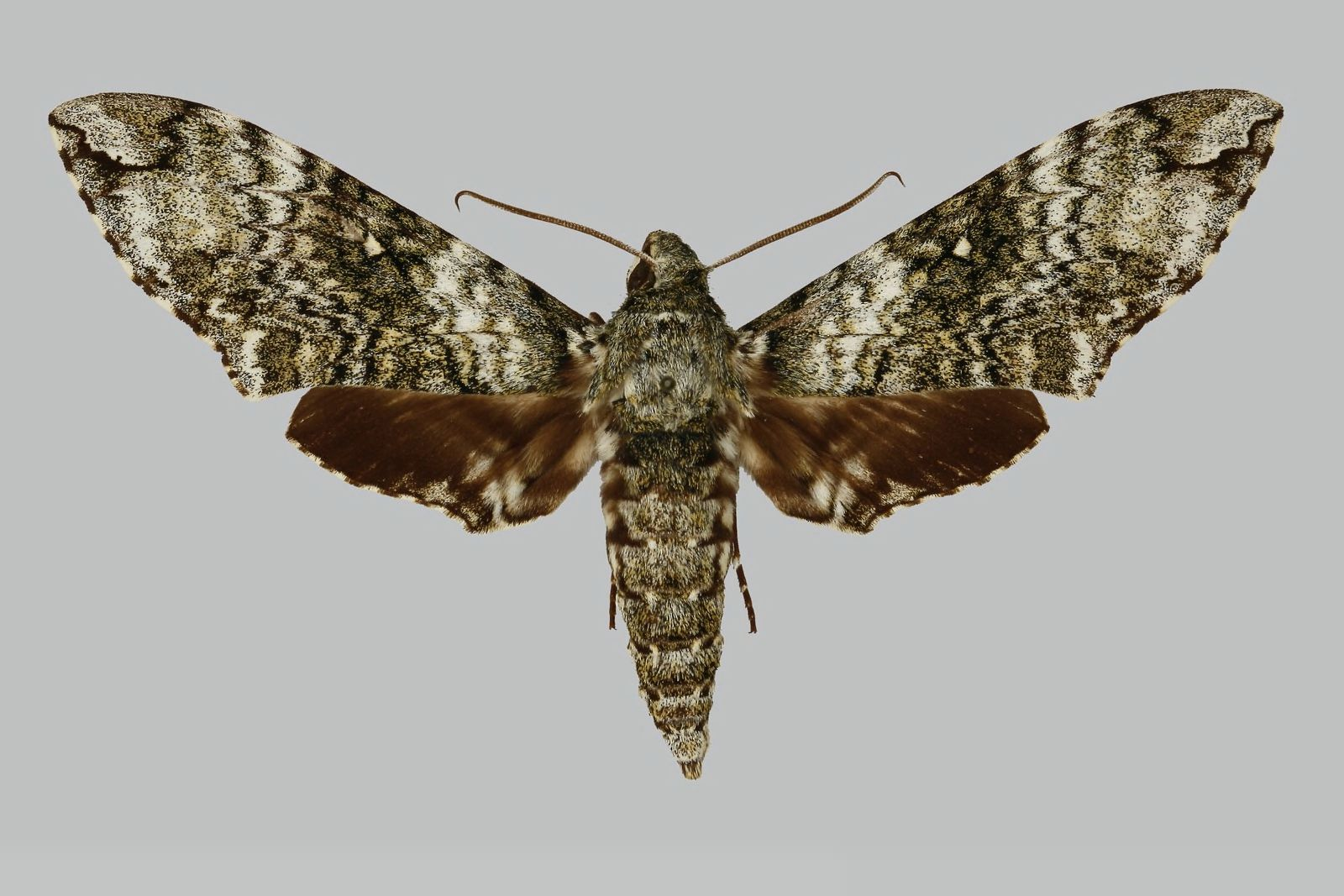
- Male
- Larva

Scientific classification
- Kingdom: Animalia
- Phylum: Arthropoda
- Clade: Pancrustacea
- Class: Insecta
- Order: Lepidoptera
- Family: Sphingidae
- Genus: Manduca
- Species: M. neglecta

Binomial name
- Manduca neglecta Haxaire & Vaglia, 2006

= Manduca neglecta =

Species of moth

Manduca neglecta is a moth of the family Sphingidae. It is known from eastern Ecuador, Peru and Bolivia.

The wingspan is 99–114 millimetres (3.9–4.5 in) for males and 106–118 millimetres (4.2–4.6 in) for females. It is similar to Manduca schausi. Adults have been recorded in January, from April to May, July to August and November to December in Ecuador. In Bolivia, it has been recorded in November. Early in January 2026, the larva of this species was identified for the first time. Since roughly 30 years, there have been reports of a conspicuous orange‑blue caterpillar, but without any information on the adult moth (imago). On 15 November 2025, the entomologist Gwendolyn Erdosh found a caterpillar in its third larval stage and, through rearing it under protected conditions, was able not only to assign it to the species but also to document the pupal stage.
