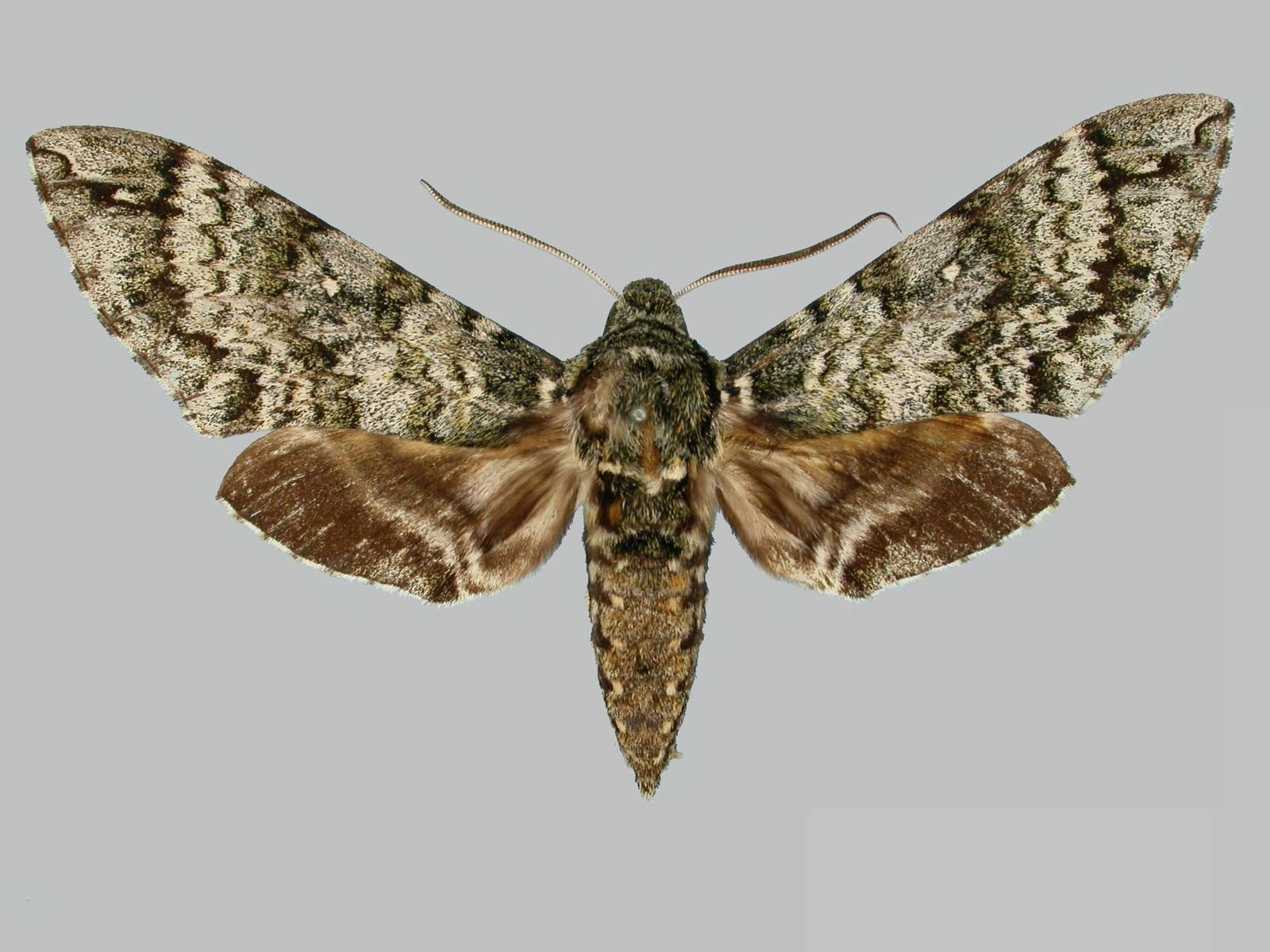
- Male

Scientific classification
- Kingdom: Animalia
- Phylum: Arthropoda
- Class: Insecta
- Order: Lepidoptera
- Family: Sphingidae
- Genus: Manduca
- Species: M. armatipes

Binomial name
- Manduca armatipes (Rothschild & Jordan, 1916)

Synonyms
- Protoparce armatipes Rothschild & Jordan, 1916

= Manduca armatipes =

Species of moth

Manduca armatipes is a moth of the family Sphingidae first described by Walter Rothschild and Karl Jordan in 1916. It is found from Argentina and Uruguay to Bolivia.

The wingspan is about 96 mm (3.8 in). It is similar in colour and pattern to Manduca lichenea, but the hindwing upperside is more extensively grey, with a patch posterior to the discal cell extending to the more proximal of the median dark bands. Furthermore, the transverse lines on the forewing upperside are more prominent.

Adults are on wing in November and February.
