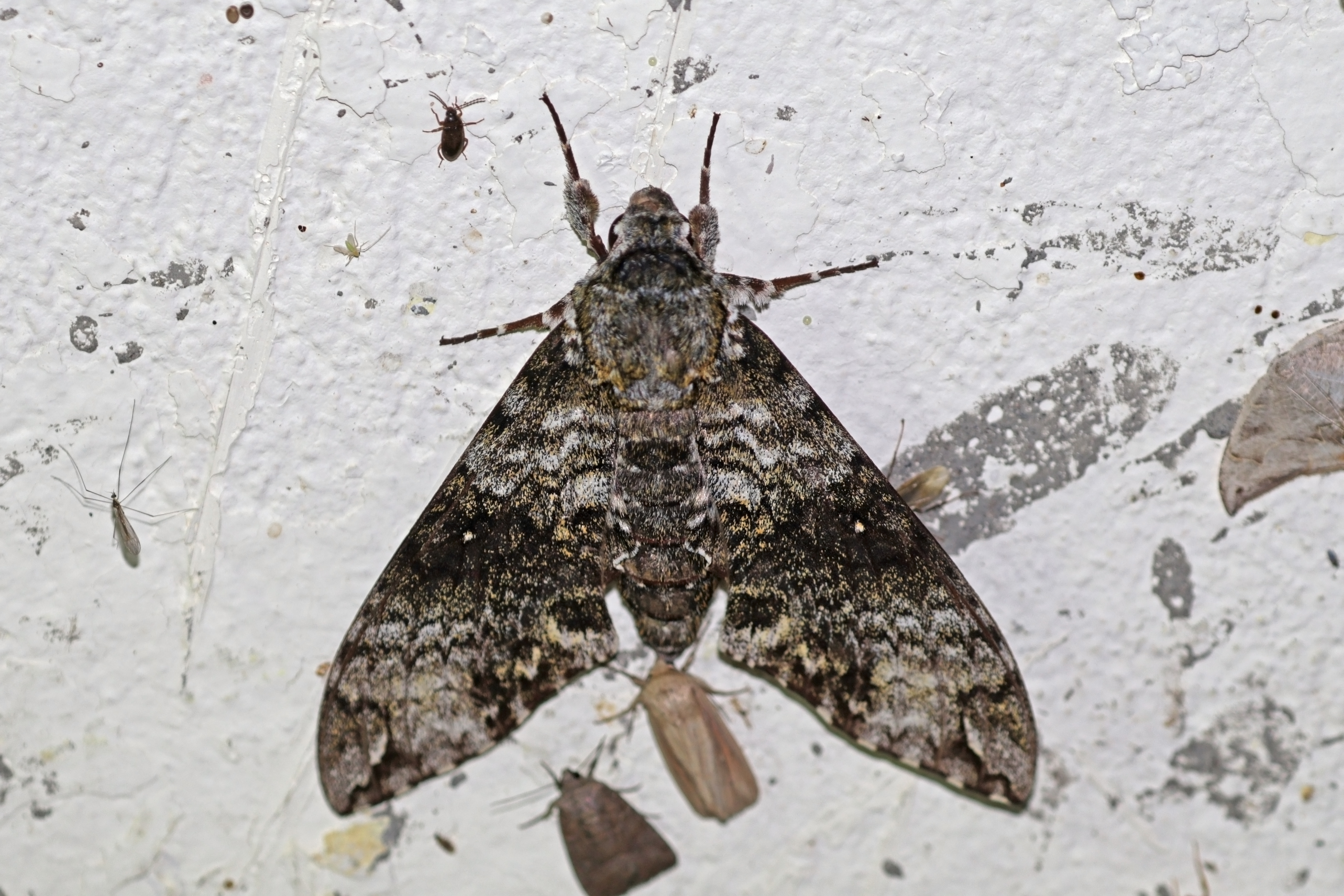
- Mount Totumas cloud forest, Panama

Scientific classification
- Kingdom: Animalia
- Phylum: Arthropoda
- Class: Insecta
- Order: Lepidoptera
- Family: Sphingidae
- Genus: Manduca
- Species: M. schausi

Binomial name
- Manduca schausi (Clark, 1919)

Synonyms
- Protoparce schausi Clark, 1919

= Manduca schausi =

Species of moth

Manduca schausi is a moth of the family Sphingidae. It is found from Mexico, Guatemala, Nicaragua and Costa Rica to Brazil, Argentina and Bolivia.

The wingspan is 114–138 mm. It is intermediate between Manduca lichenea and Manduca florestan, with a pattern that is similar to both. The body and forewings are grey with a green tinge, but the forewing upperside is darker. Adults are on wing nearly year round in Costa Rica.

The larvae feed on Capsicum annuum and Lycopersicon esculentum.
