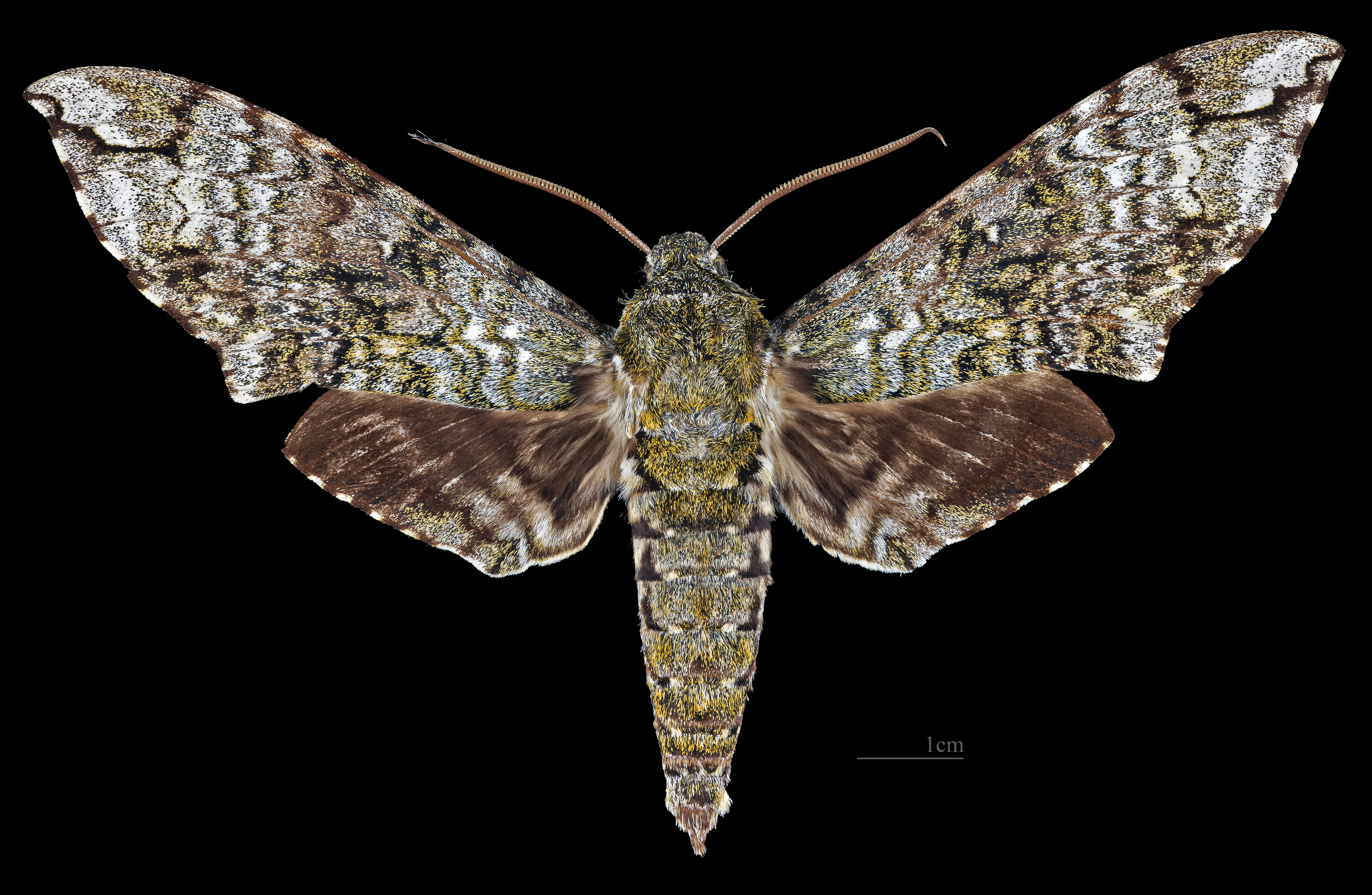
- Male dorsal
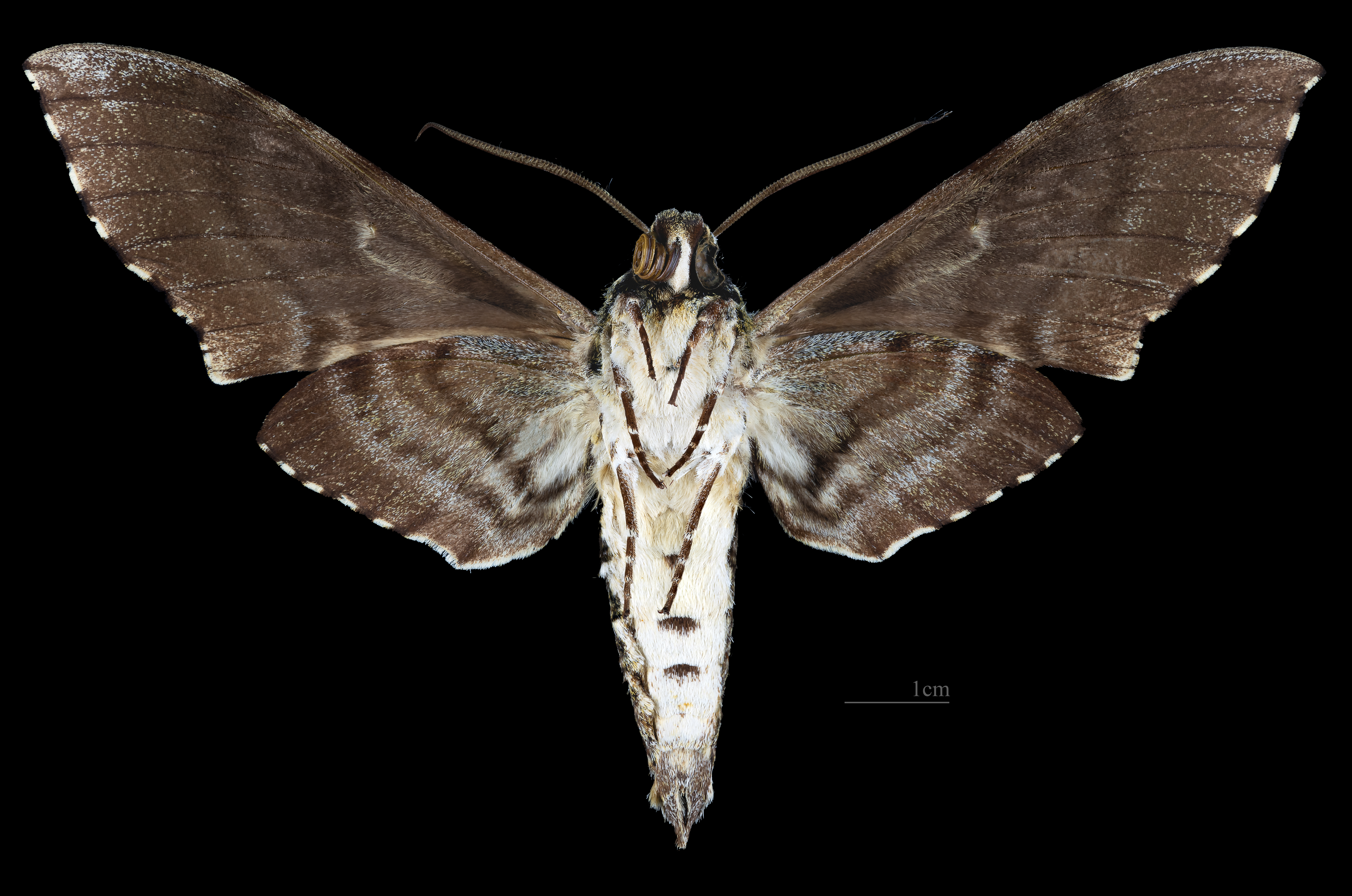
- Male ventral

Scientific classification
- Kingdom: Animalia
- Phylum: Arthropoda
- Class: Insecta
- Order: Lepidoptera
- Family: Sphingidae
- Genus: Manduca
- Species: M. lichenea

Binomial name
- Manduca lichenea (Burmeister, 1855)

Synonyms
- Sphinx lichenea Burmeister, 1855; Macrosila lichenea Walker, 1856; Manduca suavis Hodges, 1971; Chlaenogramma muscosa E. D. Jones, 1908; Diludia rufescens Butler, 1875

= Manduca lichenea =

Species of moth

Manduca lichenea is a moth of the family Sphingidae first described by Hermann Burmeister in 1855.

== Distribution ==
It is known from south-eastern Brazil.

== Description ==
The wingspan is about 94 mm.

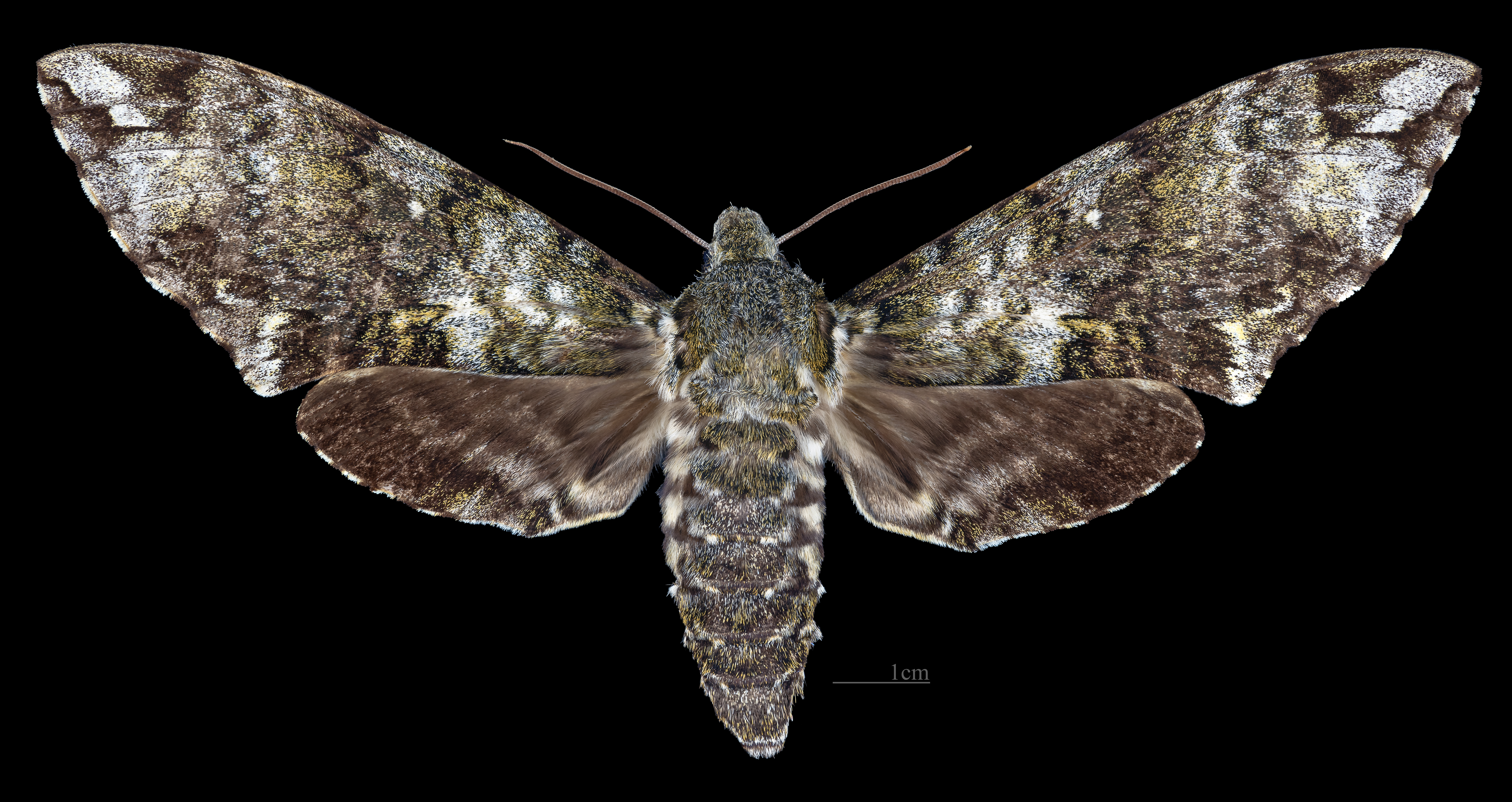
Female dorsal

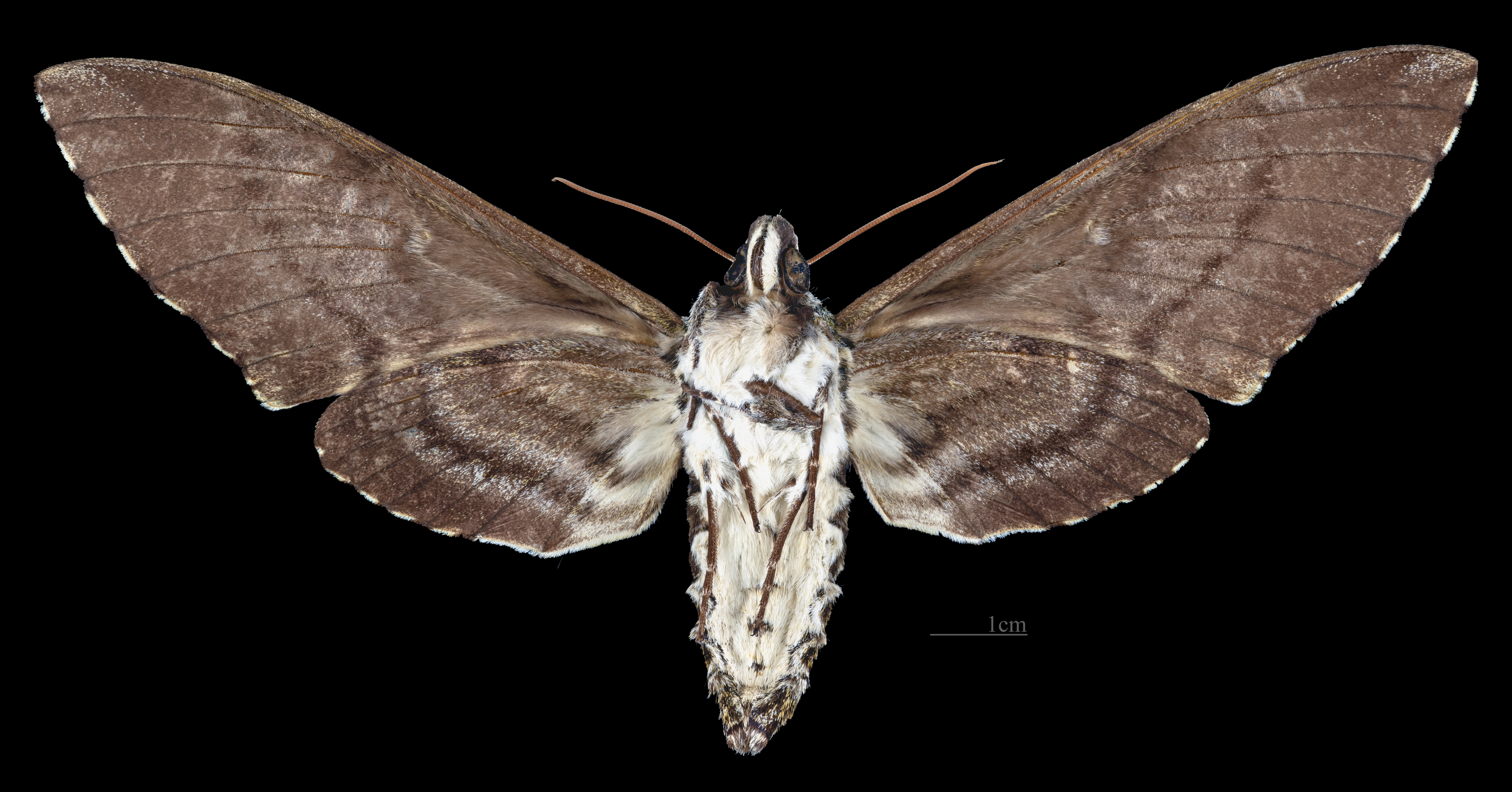
Female ventral
