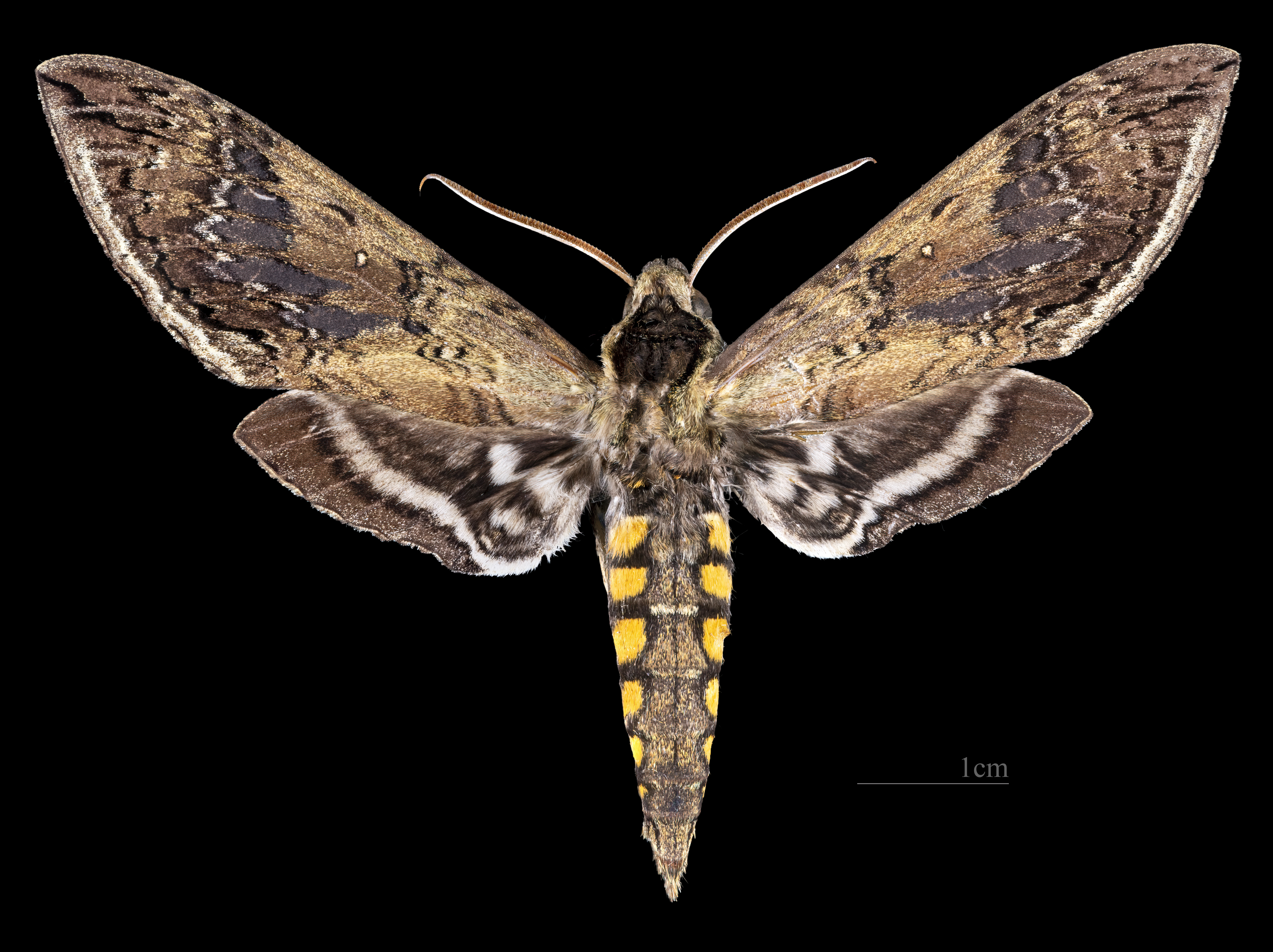
- Manduca hannibal Male dorsal
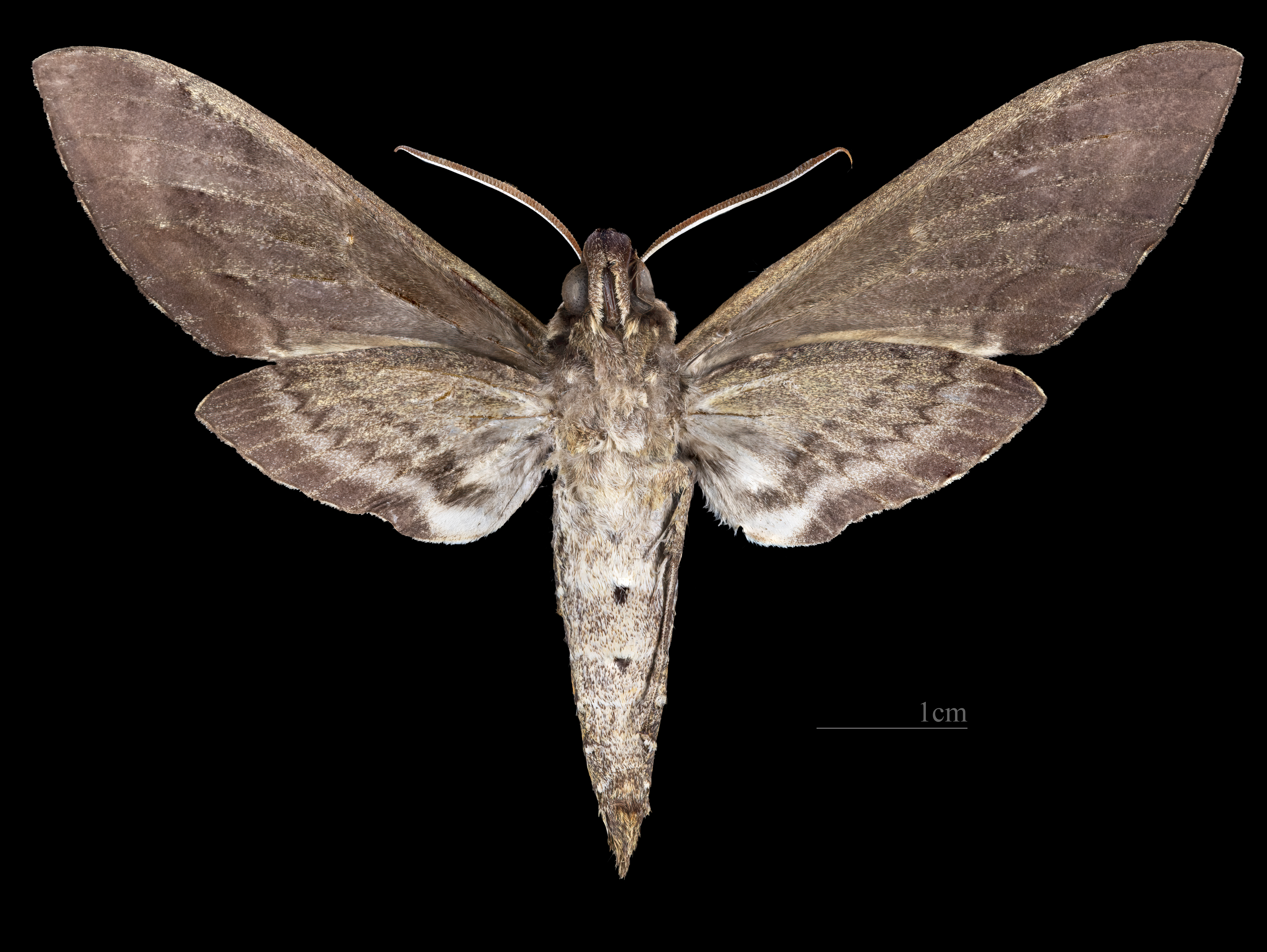
- Manduca hannibal Male ventral

Scientific classification
- Kingdom: Animalia
- Phylum: Arthropoda
- Class: Insecta
- Order: Lepidoptera
- Family: Sphingidae
- Genus: Manduca
- Species: M. hannibal

Binomial name
- Manduca hannibal (Cramer, 1779)

Synonyms
- Sphinx hannibal Cramer, 1779; Protoparce hannibal mayeri Mooser, 1940; Protoparce hannibal mayi Clark, 1917; Sphinx hannibal hamilcar Boisduval, 1875

= Manduca hannibal =

Species of moth

Manduca hannibal is a moth of the family Sphingidae.

== Distribution ==
It is found from Mexico, Belize, Nicaragua and Costa Rica to Suriname, Venezuela, Ecuador, Brazil, Bolivia and north-eastern Argentina.

== Description ==
The wingspan is 99–114 mm. There is a whitish subbasal band on the hindwing upperside and a generally rather large dirty white patch within the black central band near the anal angle.

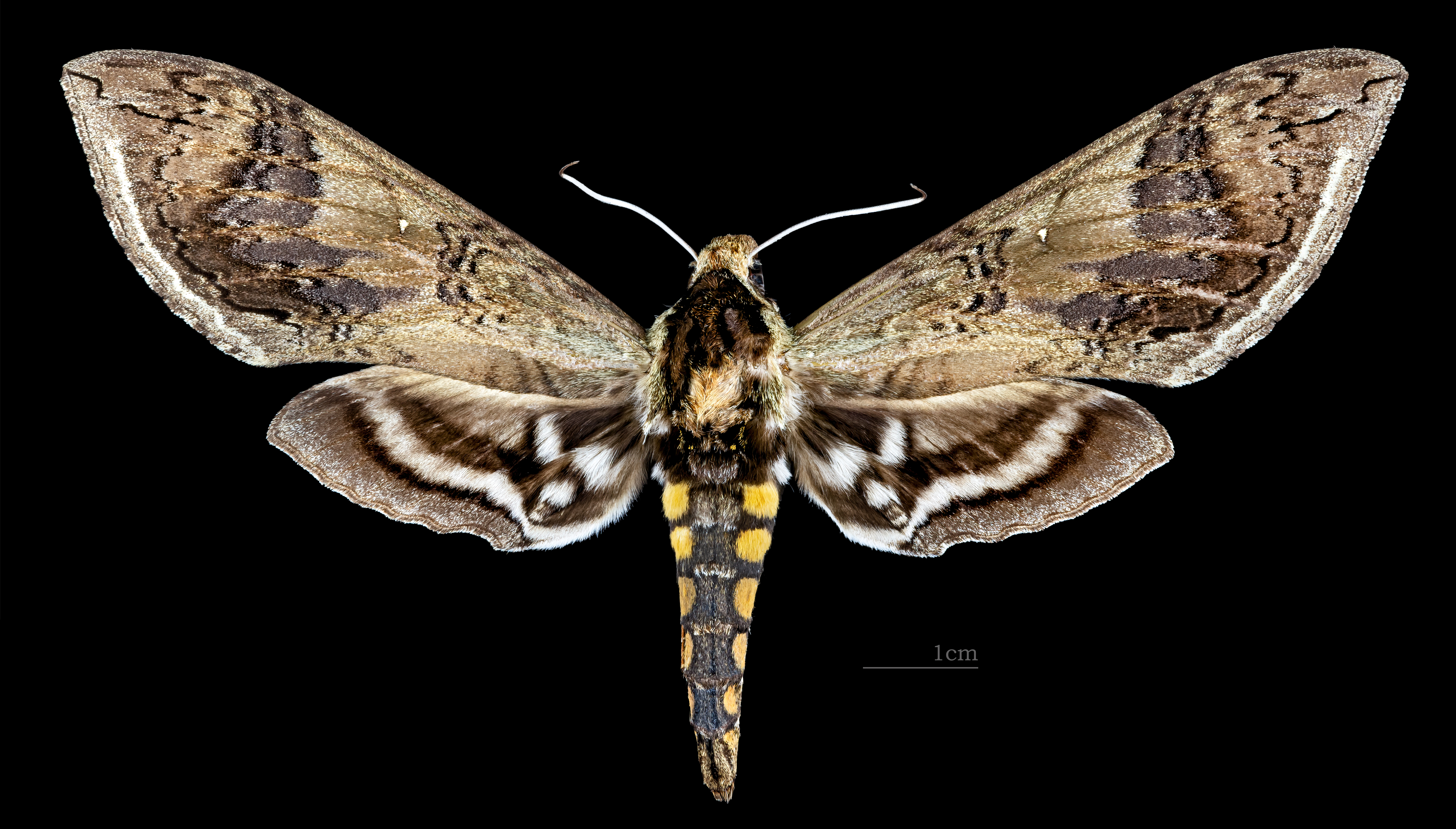
Female Dorsal side

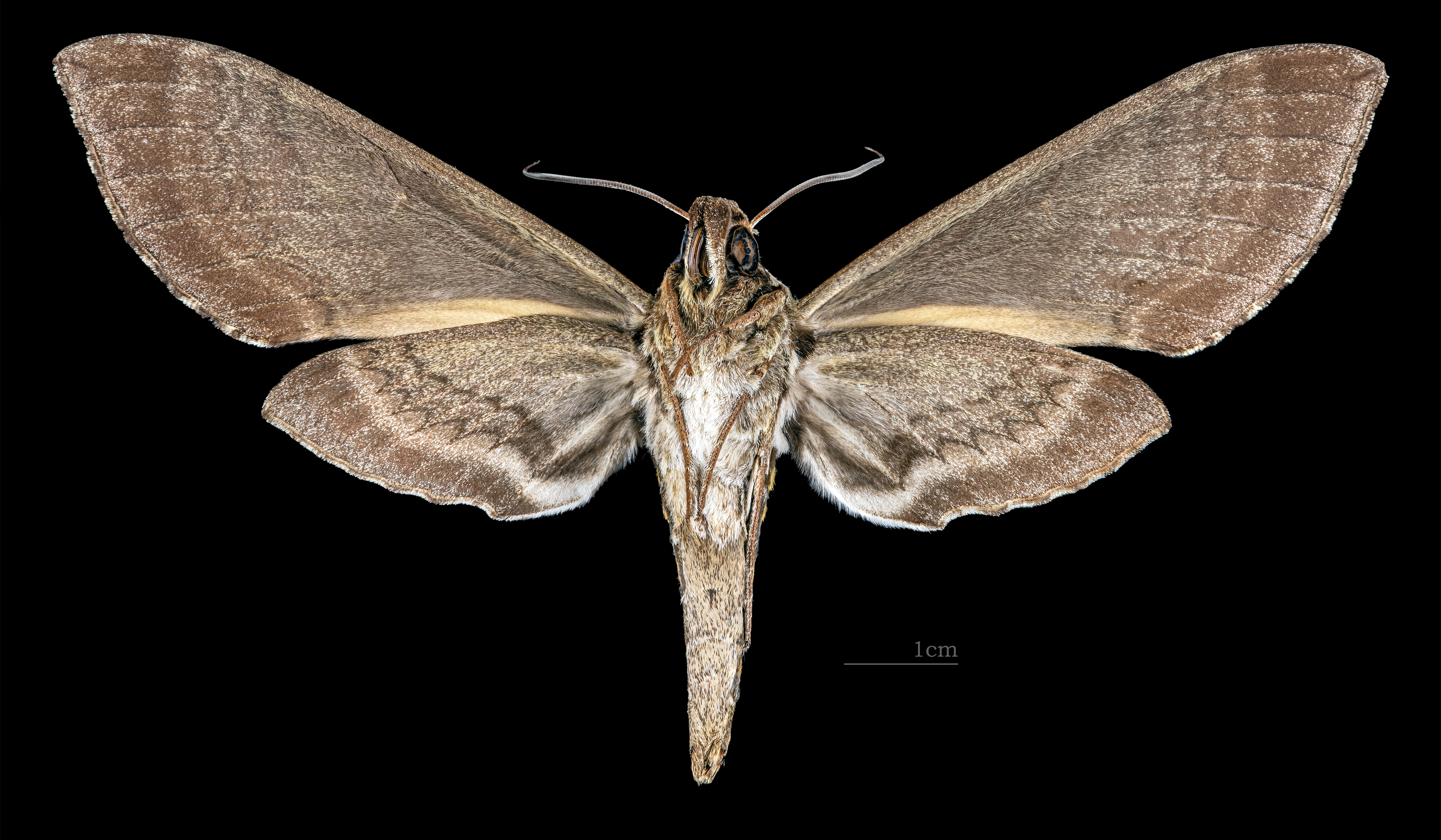
Female △ Ventral side

== Biology ==
There are multiple generations per year in Costa Rica, with adults recorded year round except January and March. In Bolivia, adults have been recorded in February, April, August, October and December.

The larvae feed on Aegiphila martinicensis.

== Subspecies ==
- Manduca hannibal hannibal (from Mexico, Belize, Nicaragua and Costa Rica to Surinam, Venezuela, Ecuador, Brazil and Bolivia)
- Manduca hannibal hamilcar (Boisduval, 1875) (Brazil and north-eastern Argentina)
- Manduca hannibal mayeri (Mooser, 1940) (Mexico)
