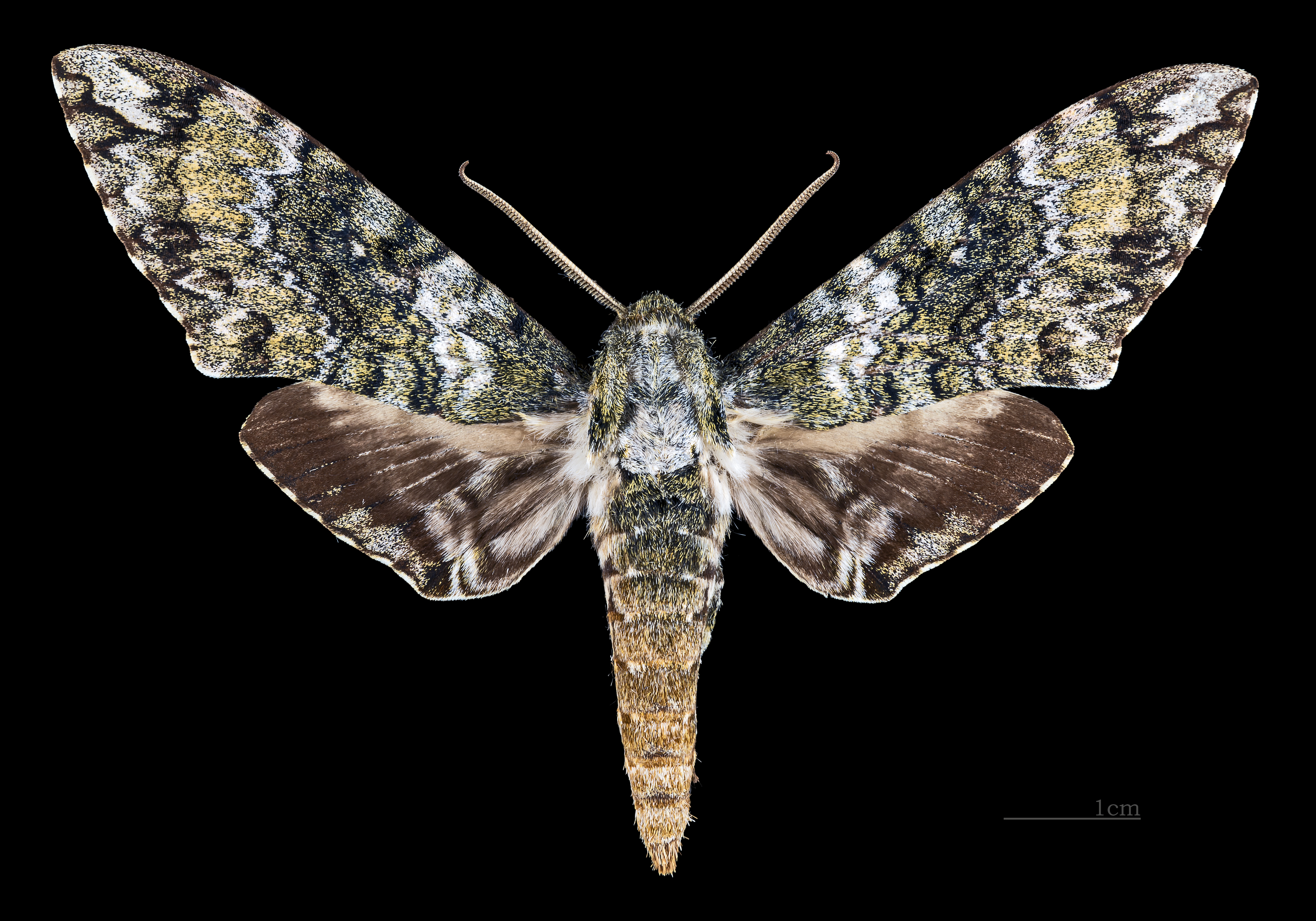
- Male, dorsal view
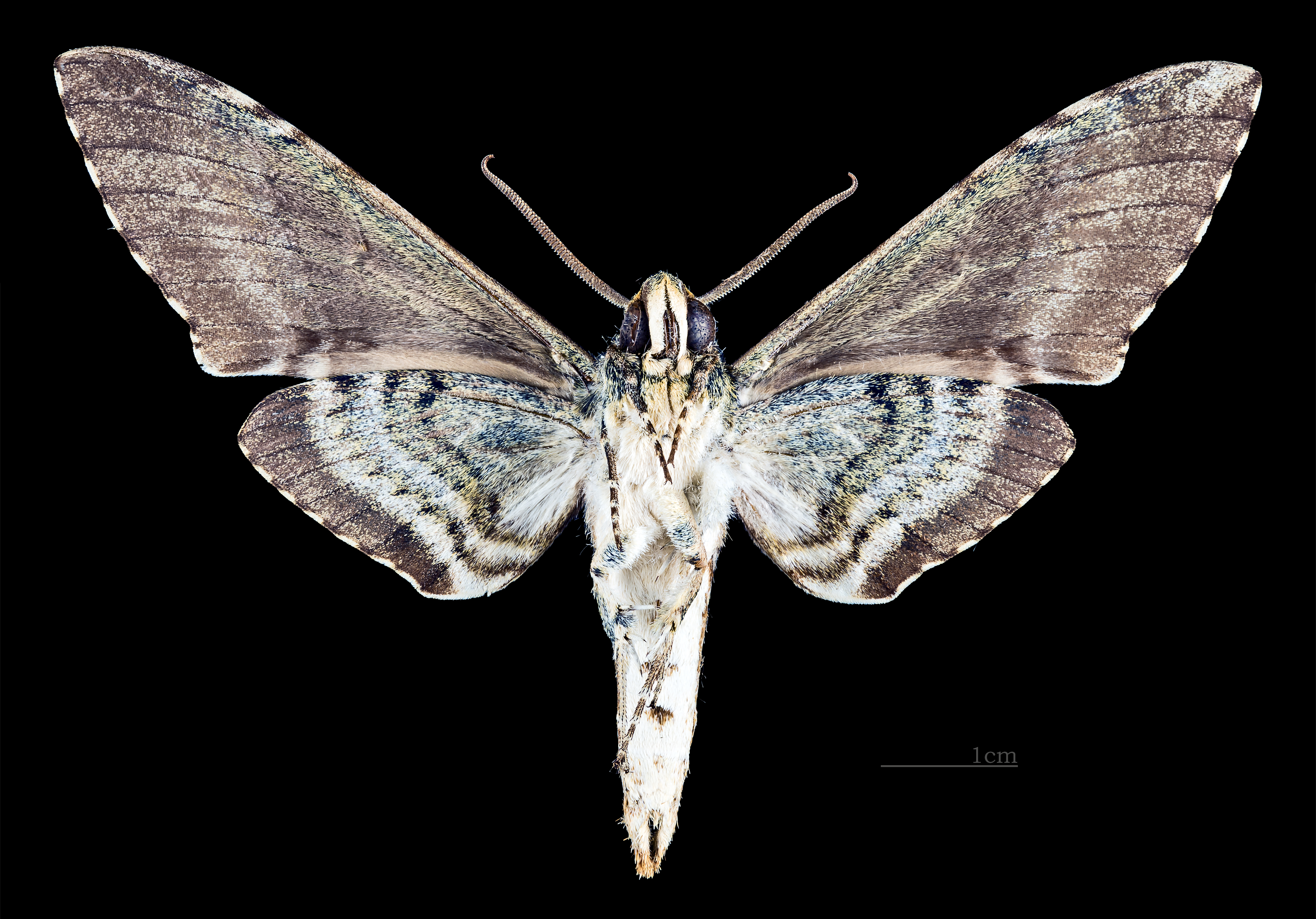
- Male, ventral view

Scientific classification
- Kingdom: Animalia
- Phylum: Arthropoda
- Class: Insecta
- Order: Lepidoptera
- Family: Sphingidae
- Genus: Manduca
- Species: M. corallina

Binomial name
- Manduca corallina (H. Druce, 1883)

Synonyms
- Diludia corallina H. Druce, 1883

= Manduca corallina =

Species of moth

Manduca corallina is a moth of the family Sphingidae first described by Herbert Druce in 1883.

== Distribution ==
It is found from Mexico, Belize, Guatemala, Nicaragua and Costa Rica south to Venezuela.

== Description ==
The wingspan is 104–110 mm.

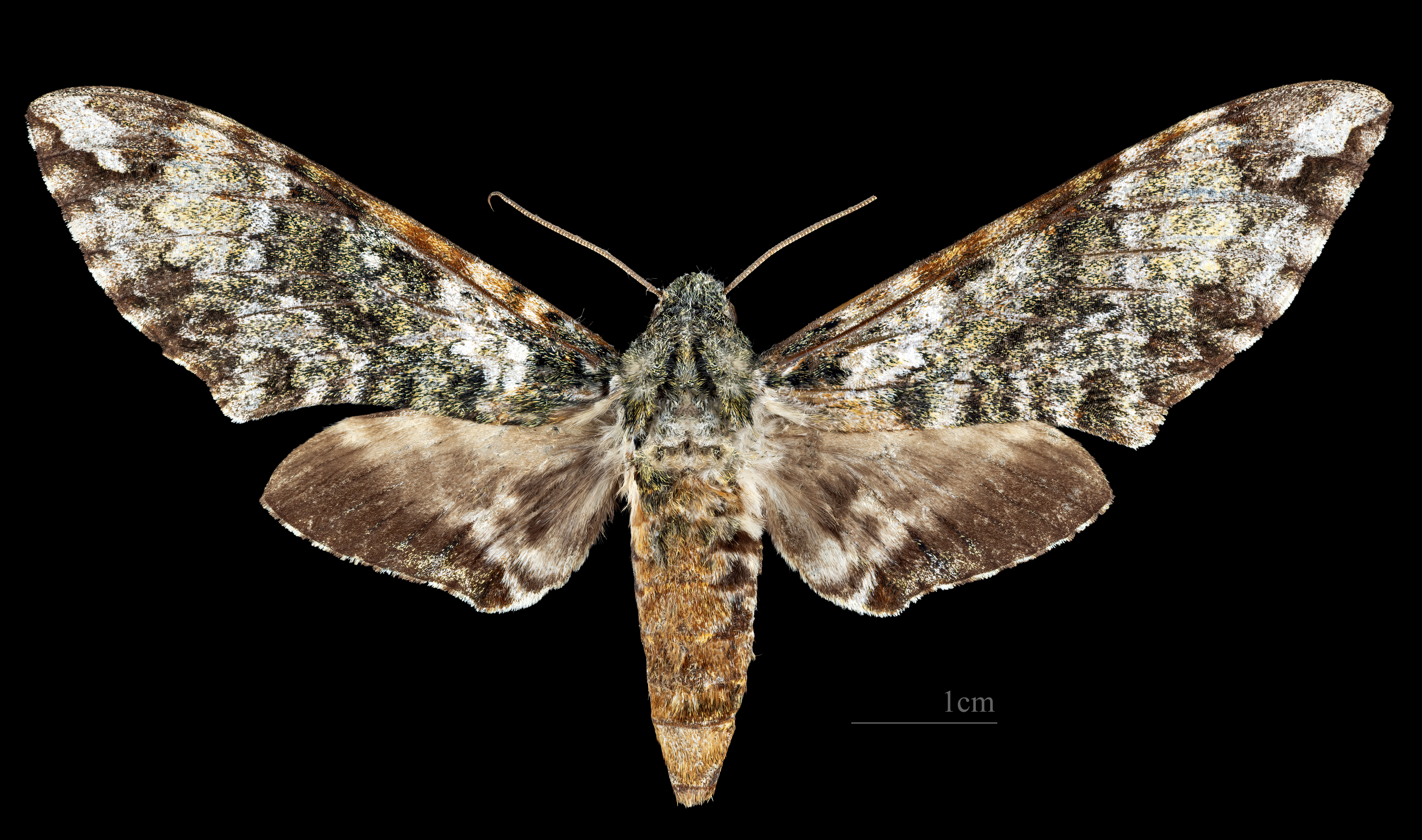
Manduca corallina ♀

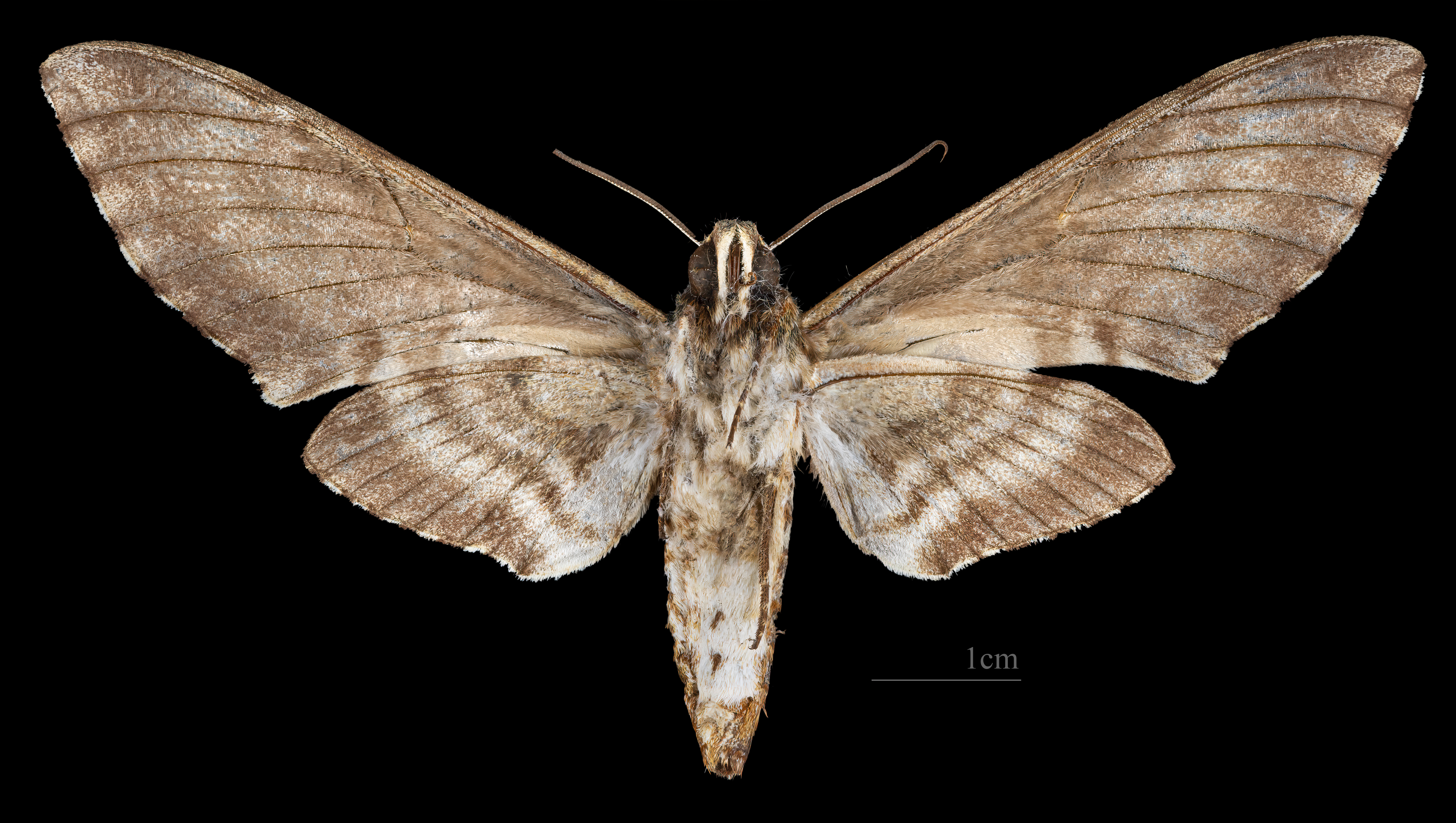
Manduca corallina ♀ △

== Biology ==
Adults are on wing year round.
