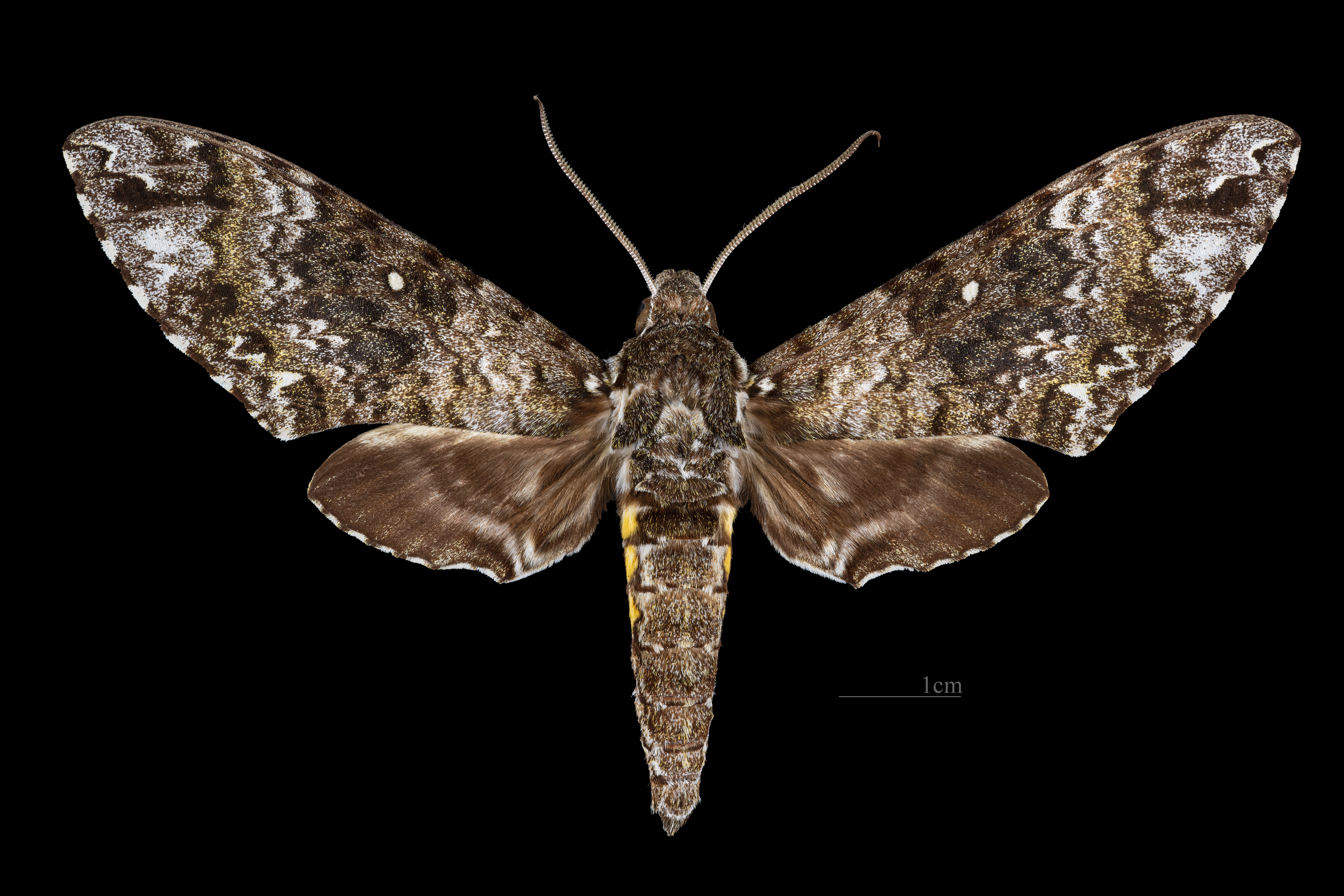
- Male dorsal
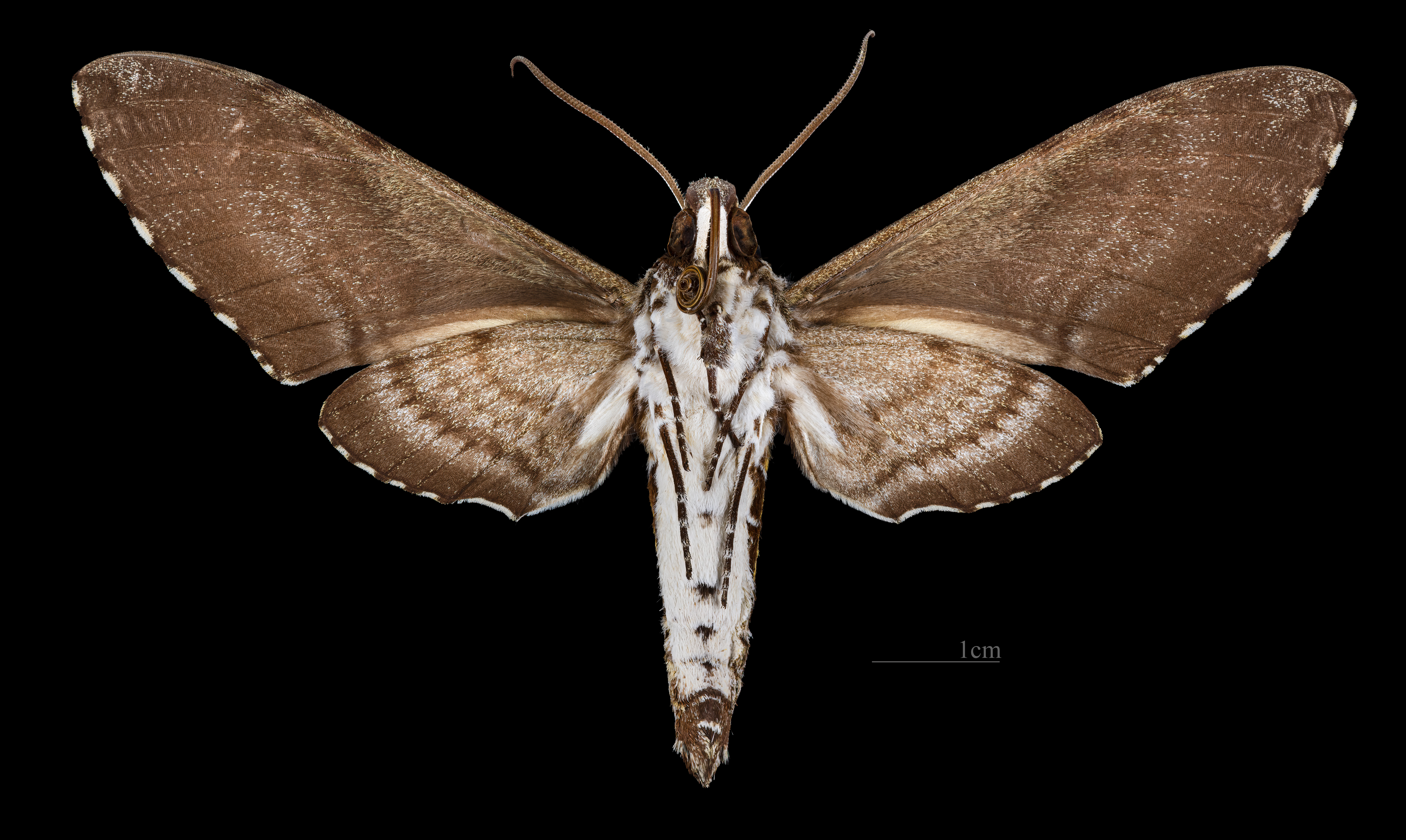
- Male ventral

Scientific classification
- Kingdom: Animalia
- Phylum: Arthropoda
- Class: Insecta
- Order: Lepidoptera
- Family: Sphingidae
- Genus: Manduca
- Species: M. trimacula

Binomial name
- Manduca trimacula (Rothschild & Jordan, 1903)

Synonyms
- Protoparce trimacula Rothschild & Jordan, 1903

= Manduca trimacula =

Species of moth

Manduca trimacula is a moth of the family Sphingidae. It is found from Colombia to Ecuador, Venezuela and Bolivia.

The length of the forewings is 55–60 mm. The body and forewing uppersides are brownish-yellow, mottled with grey and tawny olive. There is a creamy white streak located above the eye. The abdomen underside is dirty white, with brown mesial spots. The underside of both wings is brownish-yellow, although darker brown distally. The hindwing upperside is blackish brown.
