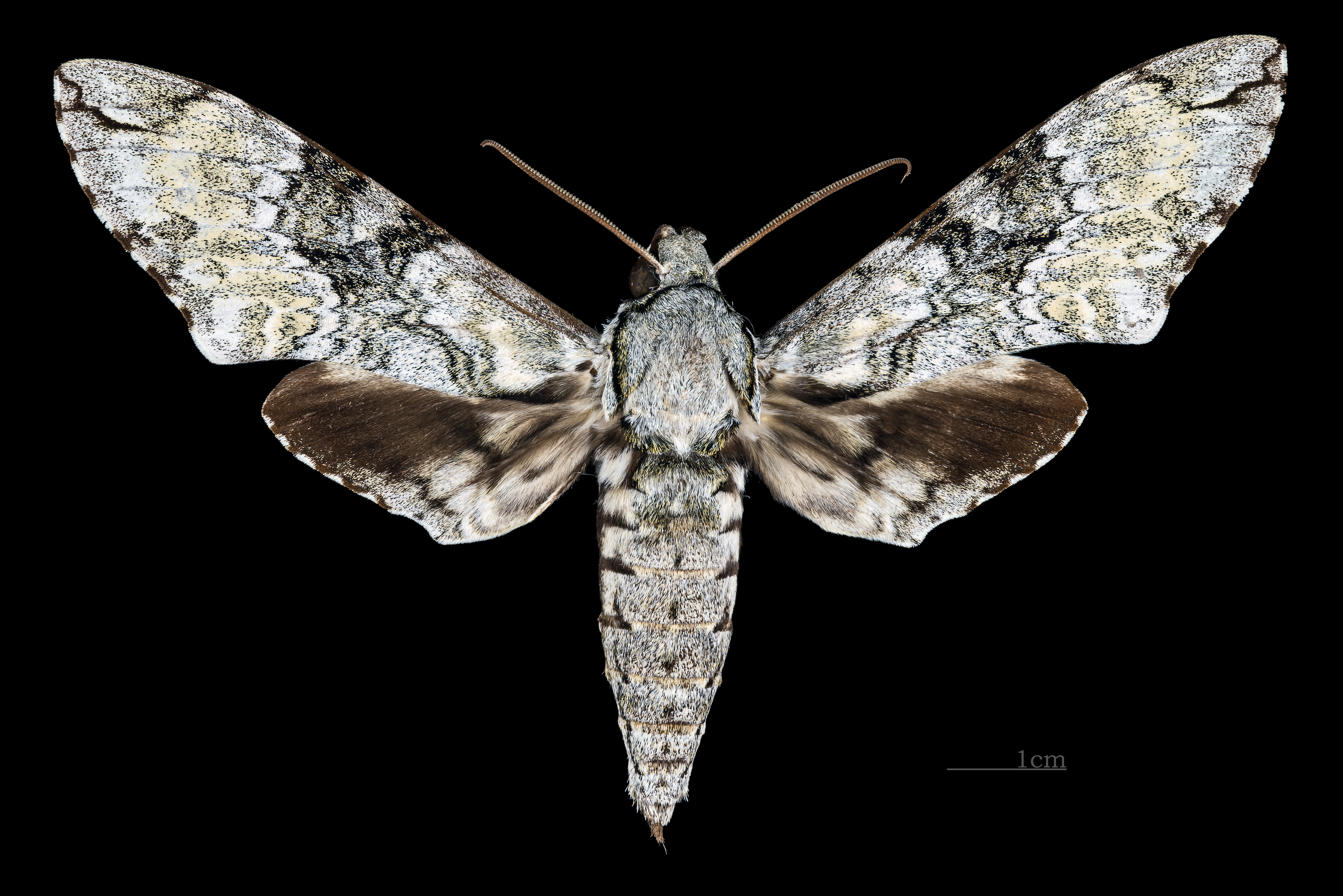
- Manduca vestalis male dorsal
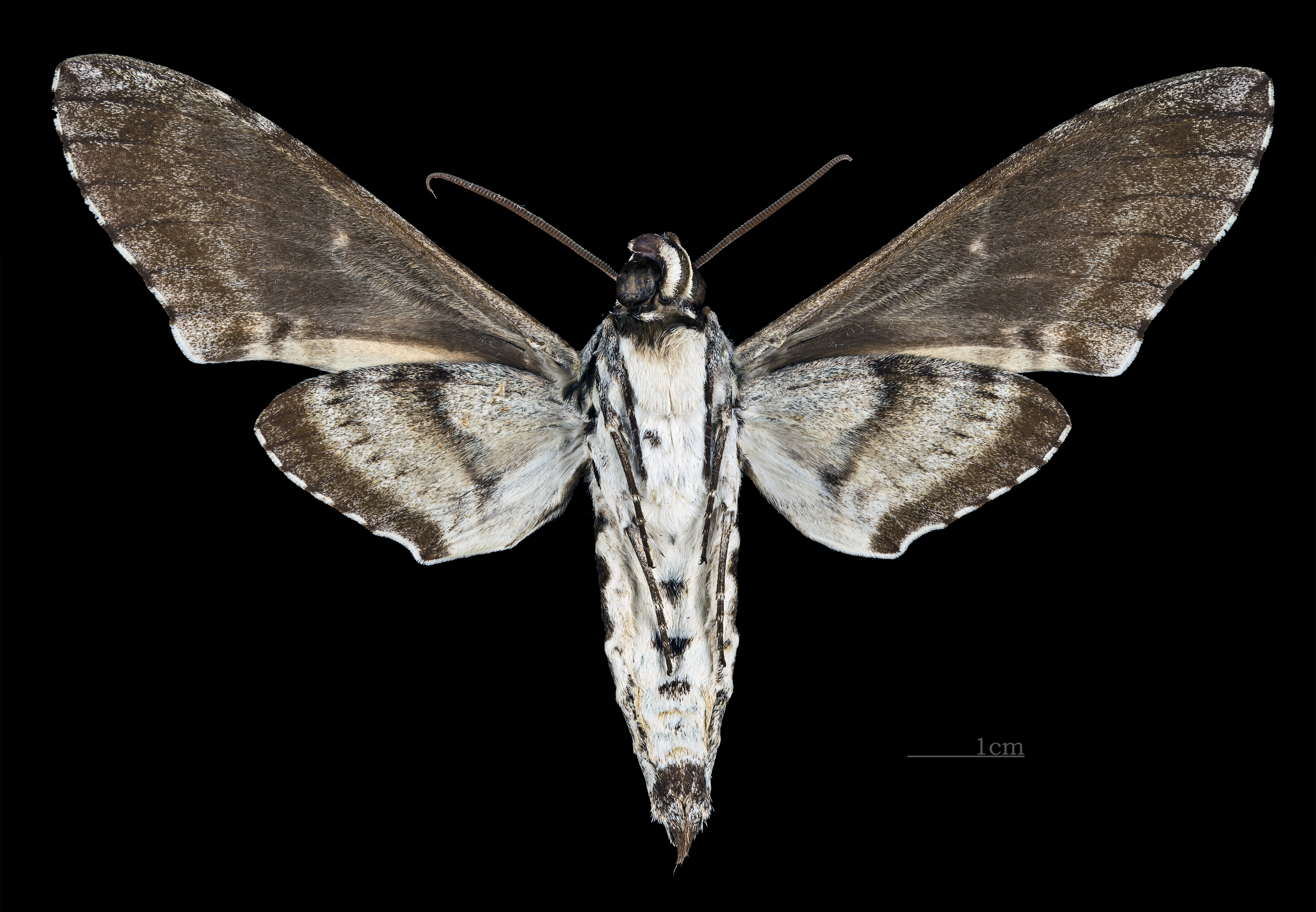
- Manduca vestalis male ventral

Scientific classification
- Kingdom: Animalia
- Phylum: Arthropoda
- Class: Insecta
- Order: Lepidoptera
- Family: Sphingidae
- Genus: Manduca
- Species: M. vestalis

Binomial name
- Manduca vestalis (Jordan, 1917)

Synonyms
- Protoparce vestalis Jordan, 1917

= Manduca vestalis =

Species of moth

Manduca vestalis is a moth of the family Sphingidae. It is found from Brazil to Venezuela and probably north-western Bolivia.

Adults have been recorded in November.
