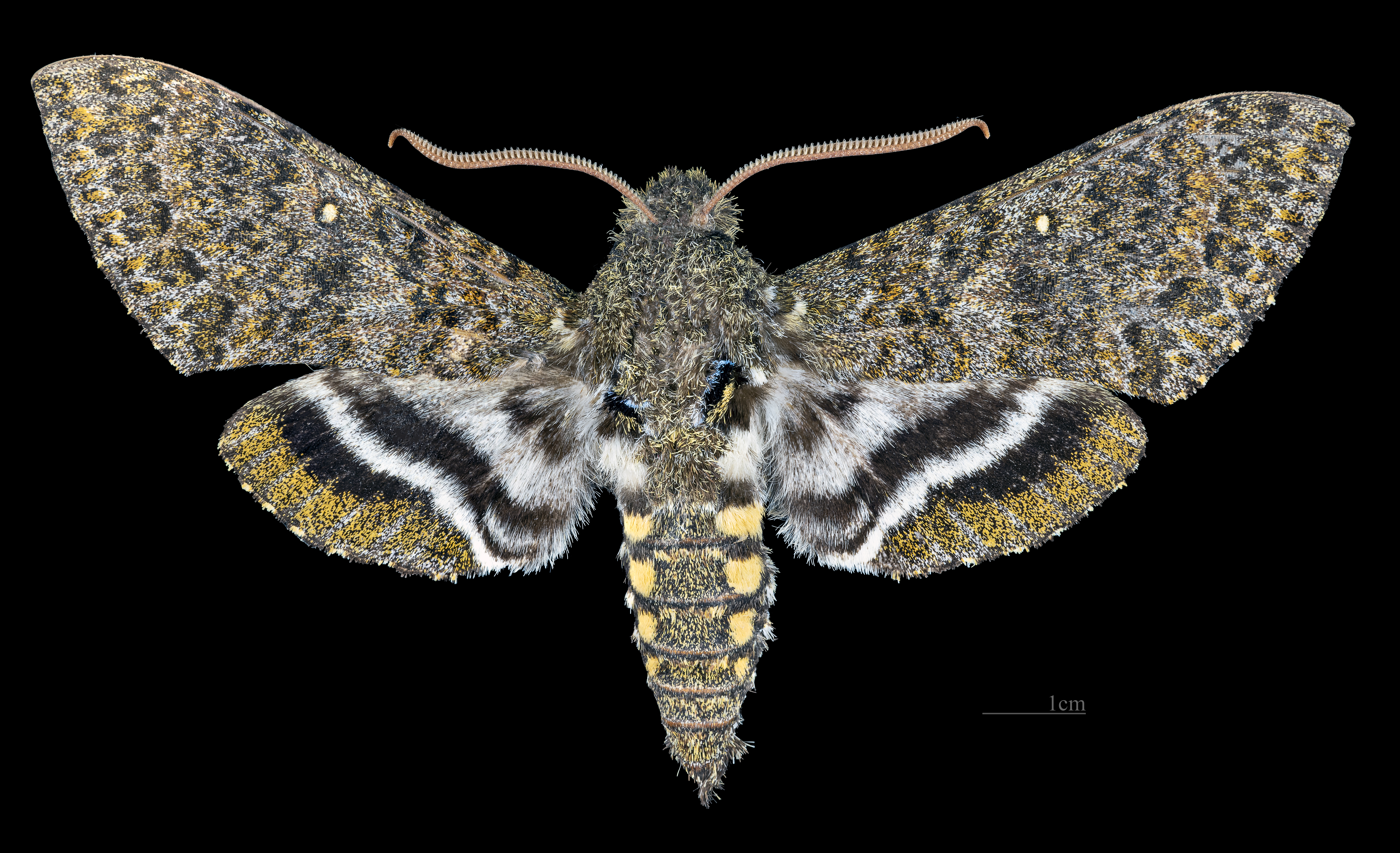
- Male dorsal
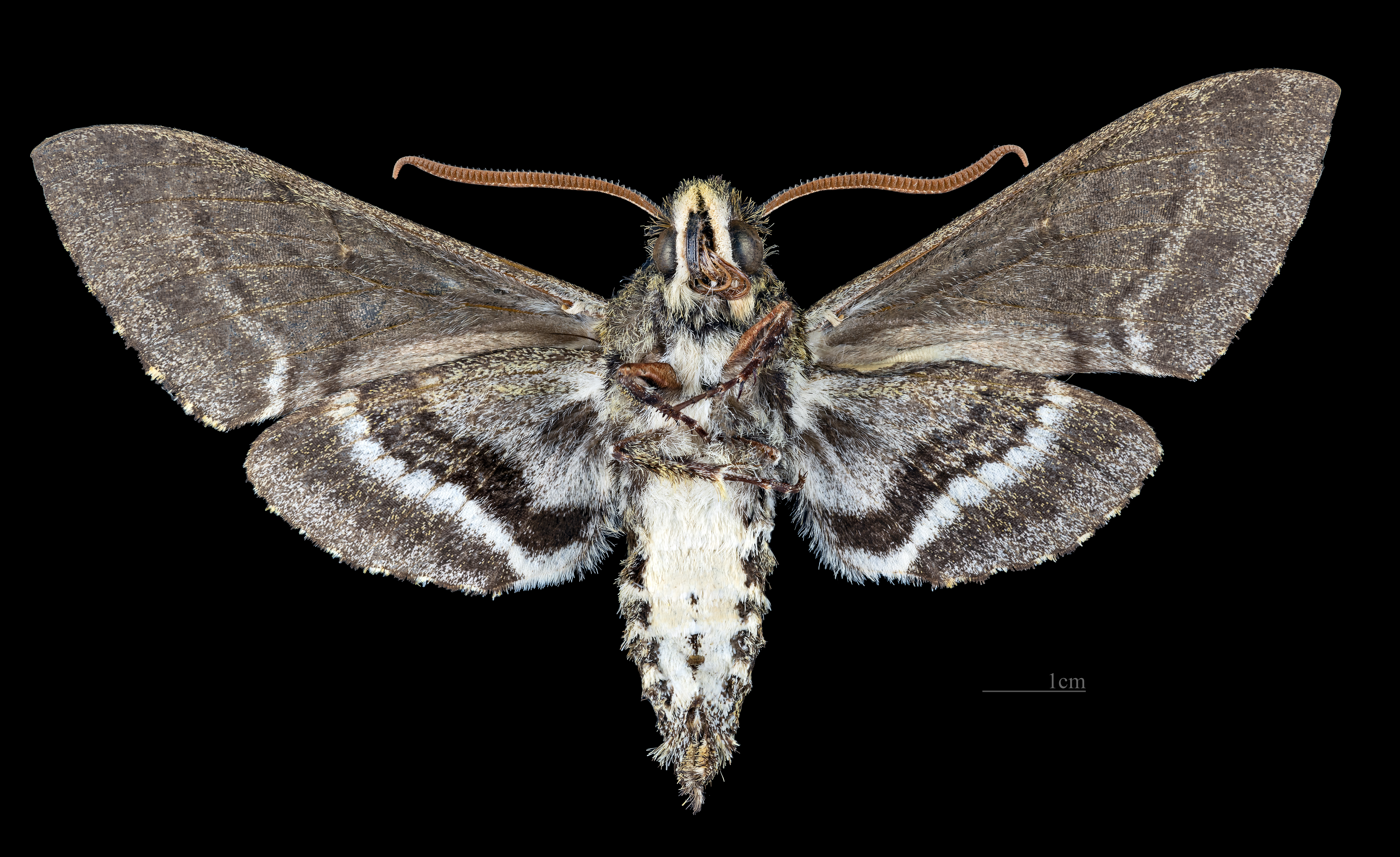
- Male ventral

Scientific classification
- Kingdom: Animalia
- Phylum: Arthropoda
- Clade: Pancrustacea
- Class: Insecta
- Order: Lepidoptera
- Family: Sphingidae
- Genus: Manduca
- Species: M. jordani

Binomial name
- Manduca jordani (Giacomelli, 1912)

Synonyms
- Protoparce jordani Giacomelli, 1912

= Manduca jordani =

Species of moth

Manduca jordani is a moth of the family Sphingidae. It is known from Argentina and Bolivia.
