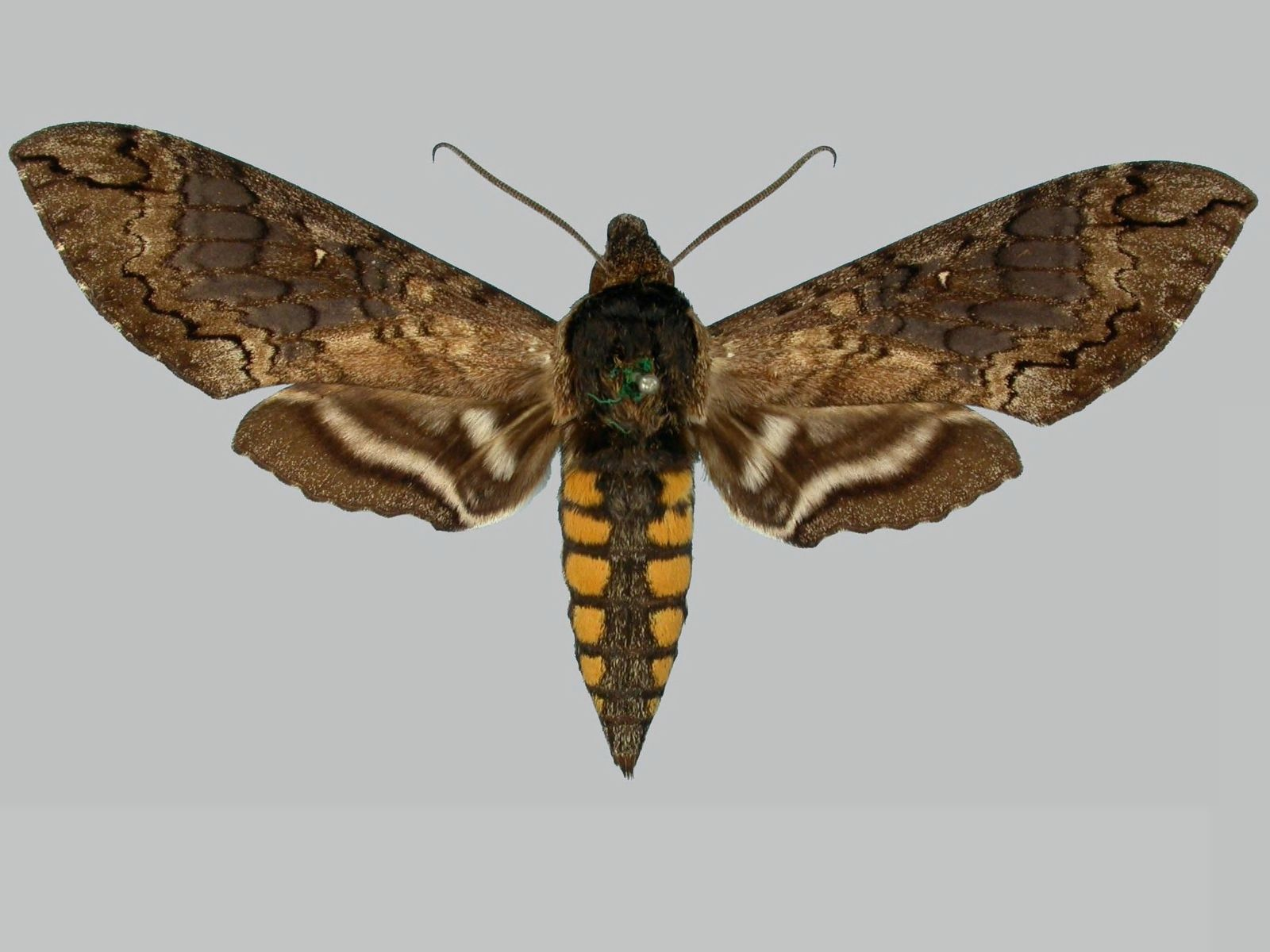
- Male

Scientific classification
- Kingdom: Animalia
- Phylum: Arthropoda
- Class: Insecta
- Order: Lepidoptera
- Family: Sphingidae
- Genus: Manduca
- Species: M. contracta

Binomial name
- Manduca contracta (Butler, 1875)

Synonyms
- Protoparce contracta Butler, 1875; Sphinx panaquire Berg, 1885; Protoparce lucetius argentina Clark, 1926; Protoparce lucetius exiguus Gehlen, 1942; Protoparce lucetius nubila Rothschild & Jordan, 1903

= Manduca contracta =

Species of moth

Manduca contracta is a moth of the family Sphingidae. It is known from Bolivia, Argentina and is probably also present in Uruguay.

The wingspan is 95–105 mm.

Adults have been recorded in February, March, April, May, July, November and December.
