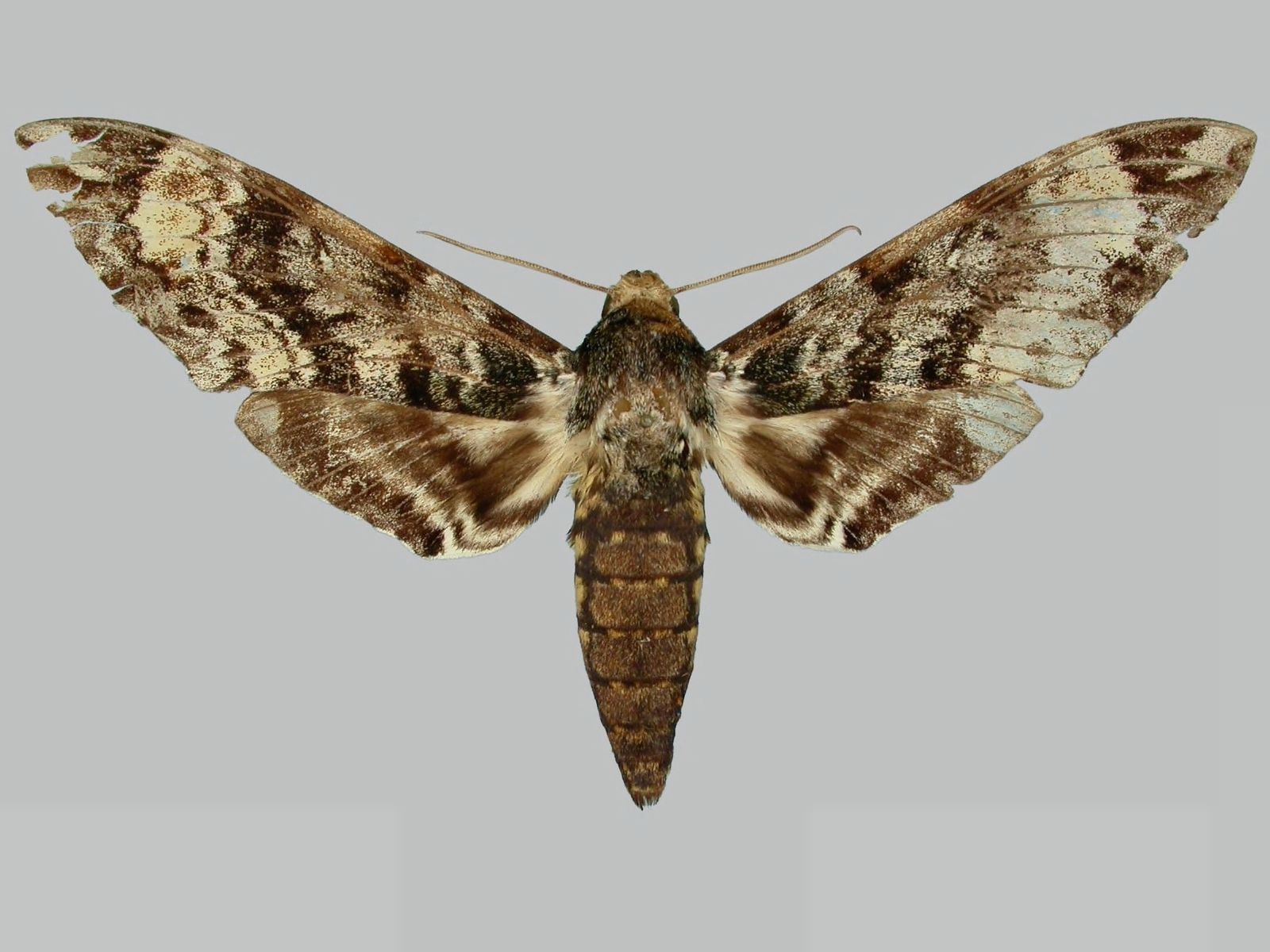

Scientific classification
- Kingdom: Animalia
- Phylum: Arthropoda
- Class: Insecta
- Order: Lepidoptera
- Family: Sphingidae
- Genus: Manduca
- Species: M. fosteri

Binomial name
- Manduca fosteri (Rothschild & Jordan, 1906)

Synonyms
- Protoparce fosteri Rothschild & Jordan, 1906; Protoparce grandis Daniel, 1949

= Manduca fosteri =

Species of moth

Manduca fosteri is a moth of the family Sphingidae first described by Walter Rothschild and Karl Jordan in 1906. It is known from Paraguay and southern Brazil.
