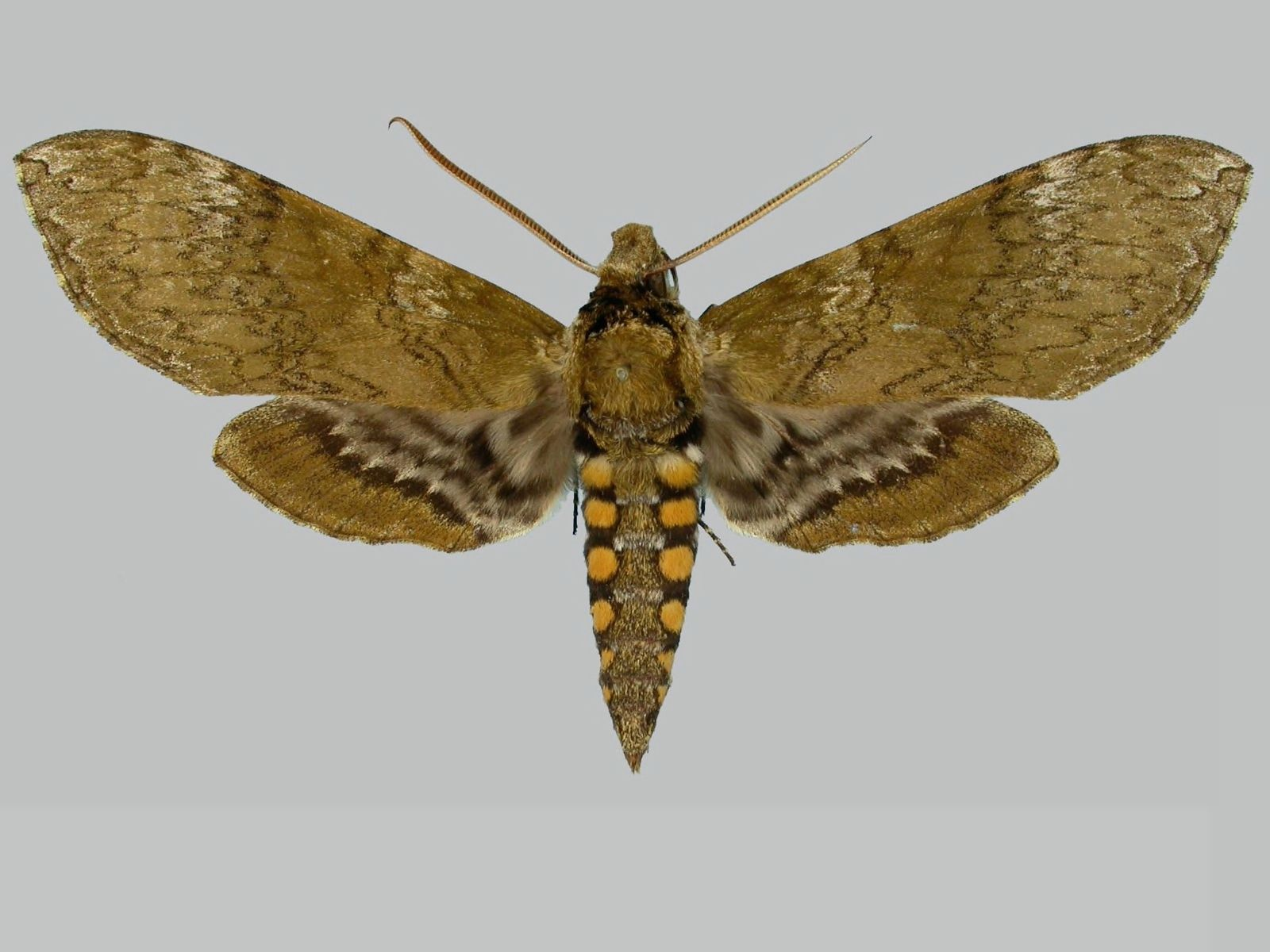
- Male

Scientific classification
- Kingdom: Animalia
- Phylum: Arthropoda
- Clade: Pancrustacea
- Class: Insecta
- Order: Lepidoptera
- Family: Sphingidae
- Genus: Manduca
- Species: M. johanni

Binomial name
- Manduca johanni (Cary, 1958)

Synonyms
- Phlegethontius johanni Cary, 1958

= Manduca johanni =

Species of moth

Manduca johanni is a moth of the family Sphingidae. It is known from Haiti and the Dominican Republic.

The wingspan is about 115 mm. Adults have been recorded in May and June.
