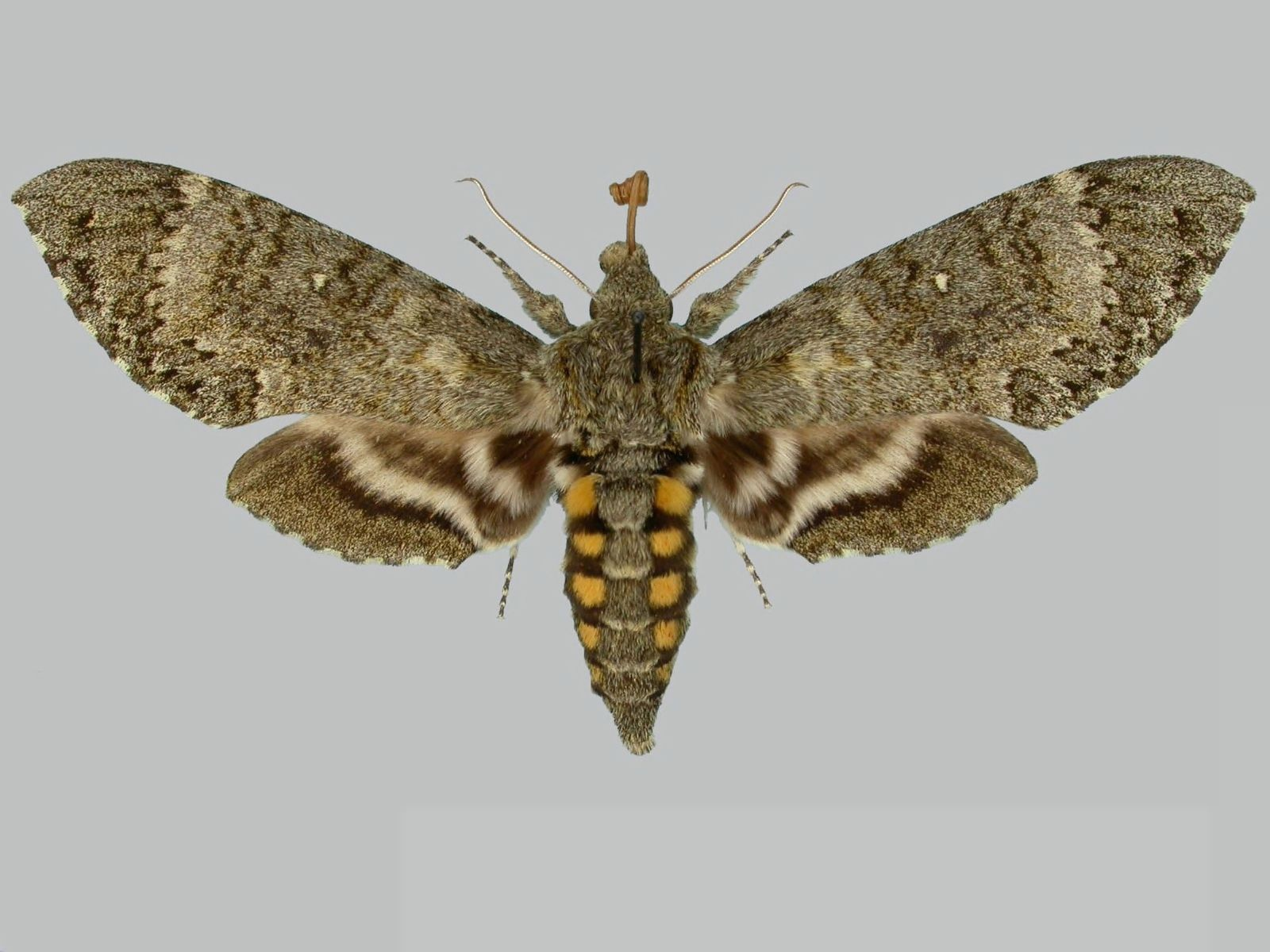
- Female

Scientific classification
- Kingdom: Animalia
- Phylum: Arthropoda
- Class: Insecta
- Order: Lepidoptera
- Family: Sphingidae
- Genus: Manduca
- Species: M. mossi

Binomial name
- Manduca mossi (Jordan, 1911)

Synonyms
- Protoparce mossi Jordan, 1911

= Manduca mossi =

Species of moth

Manduca mossi is a moth of the family Sphingidae. It is known from Peru, eastern Ecuador and Bolivia.

Adults have been recorded in January.
