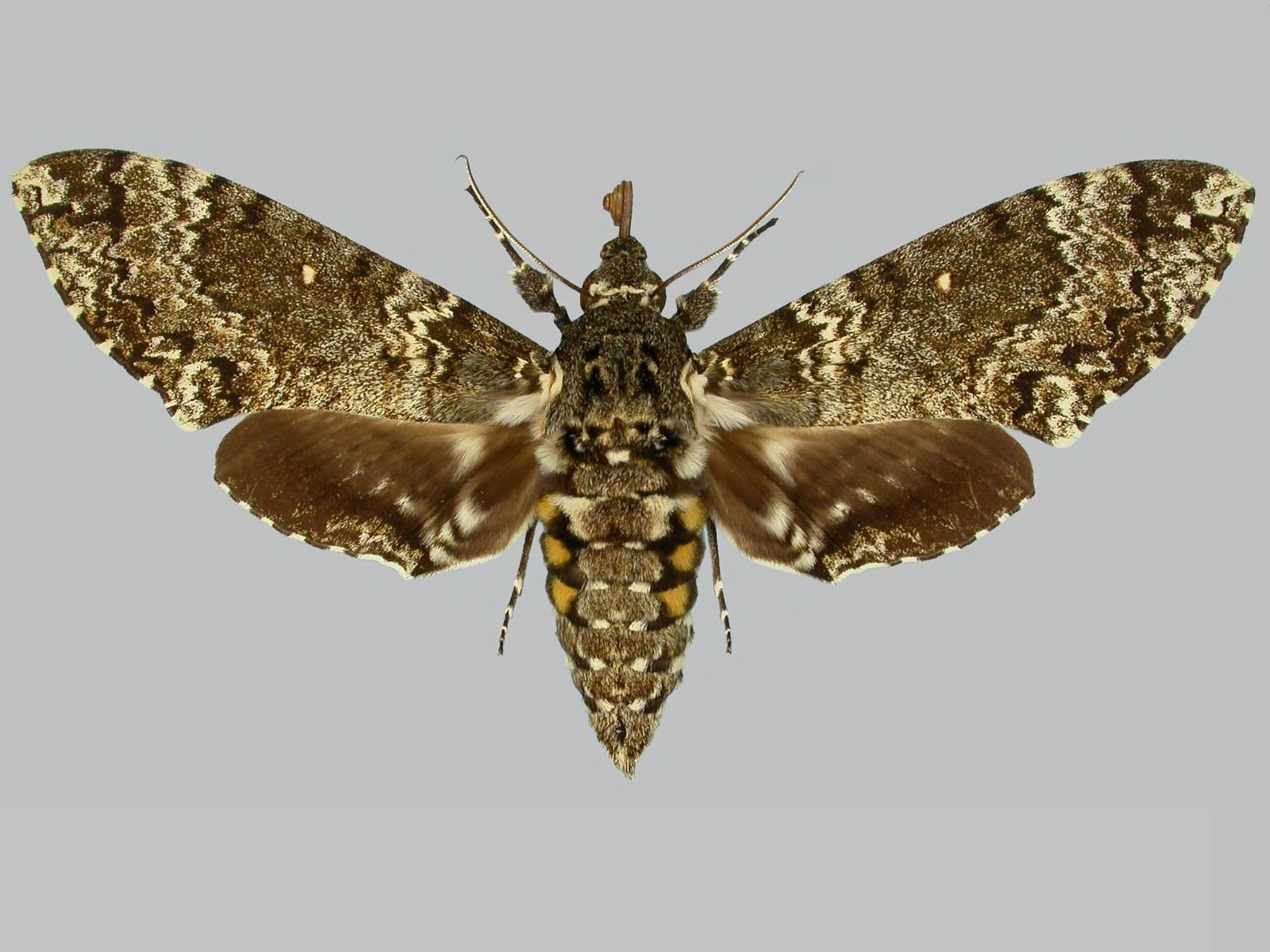

Scientific classification
- Kingdom: Animalia
- Phylum: Arthropoda
- Class: Insecta
- Order: Lepidoptera
- Family: Sphingidae
- Genus: Manduca
- Species: M. chinchilla

Binomial name
- Manduca chinchilla (Gehlen, 1942)

Synonyms
- Protoparce chinchilla Gehlen, 1942

= Manduca chinchilla =

Species of moth

Manduca chinchilla is a moth of the family Sphingidae. It is known from Peru.
