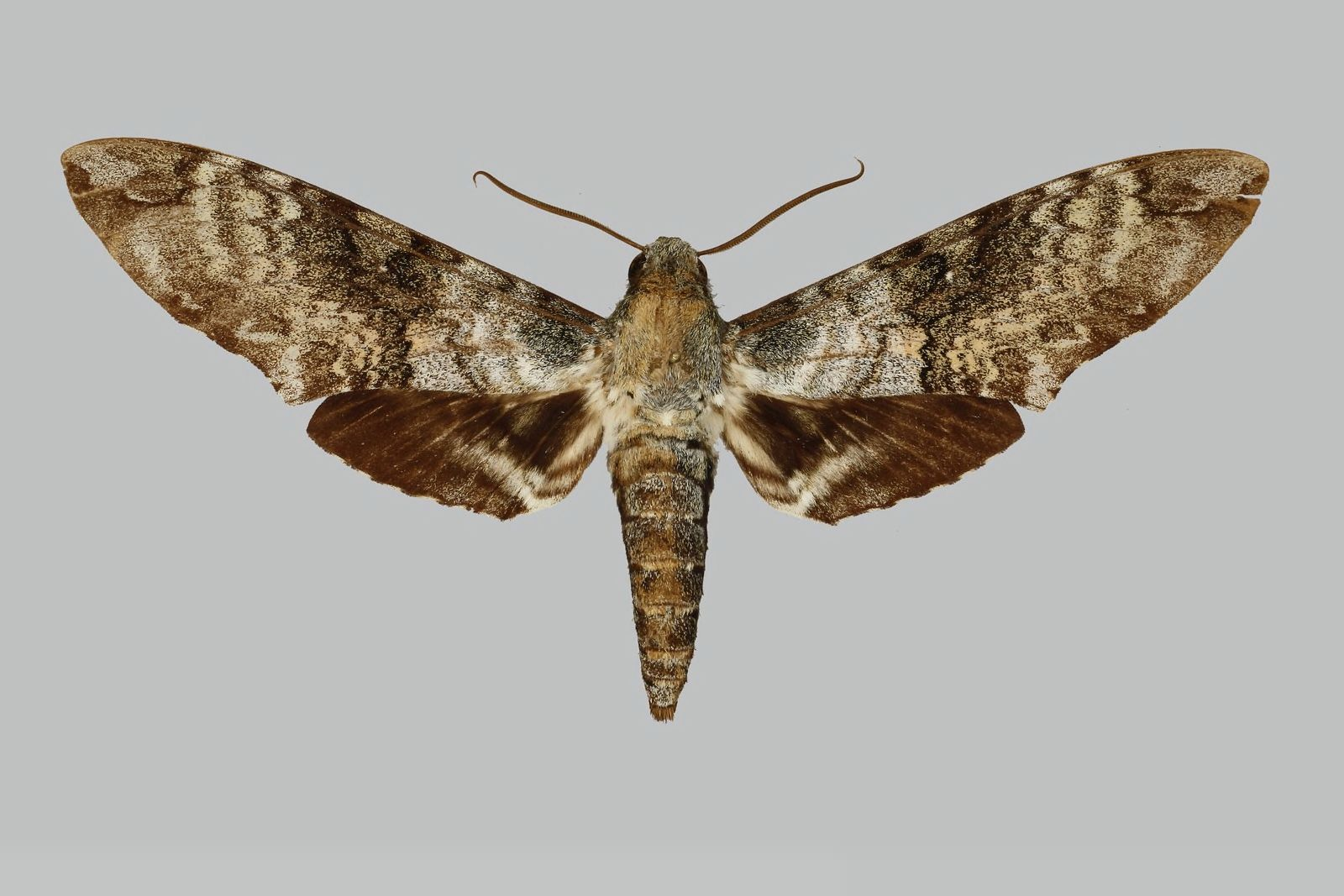
- Male

Scientific classification
- Kingdom: Animalia
- Phylum: Arthropoda
- Clade: Pancrustacea
- Class: Insecta
- Order: Lepidoptera
- Family: Sphingidae
- Genus: Manduca
- Species: M. gloriosa

Binomial name
- Manduca gloriosa Eitschberger & Haxaire, 2007

= Manduca gloriosa =

Species of moth

Manduca gloriosa is a moth of the family Sphingidae. It is known from Peru.
