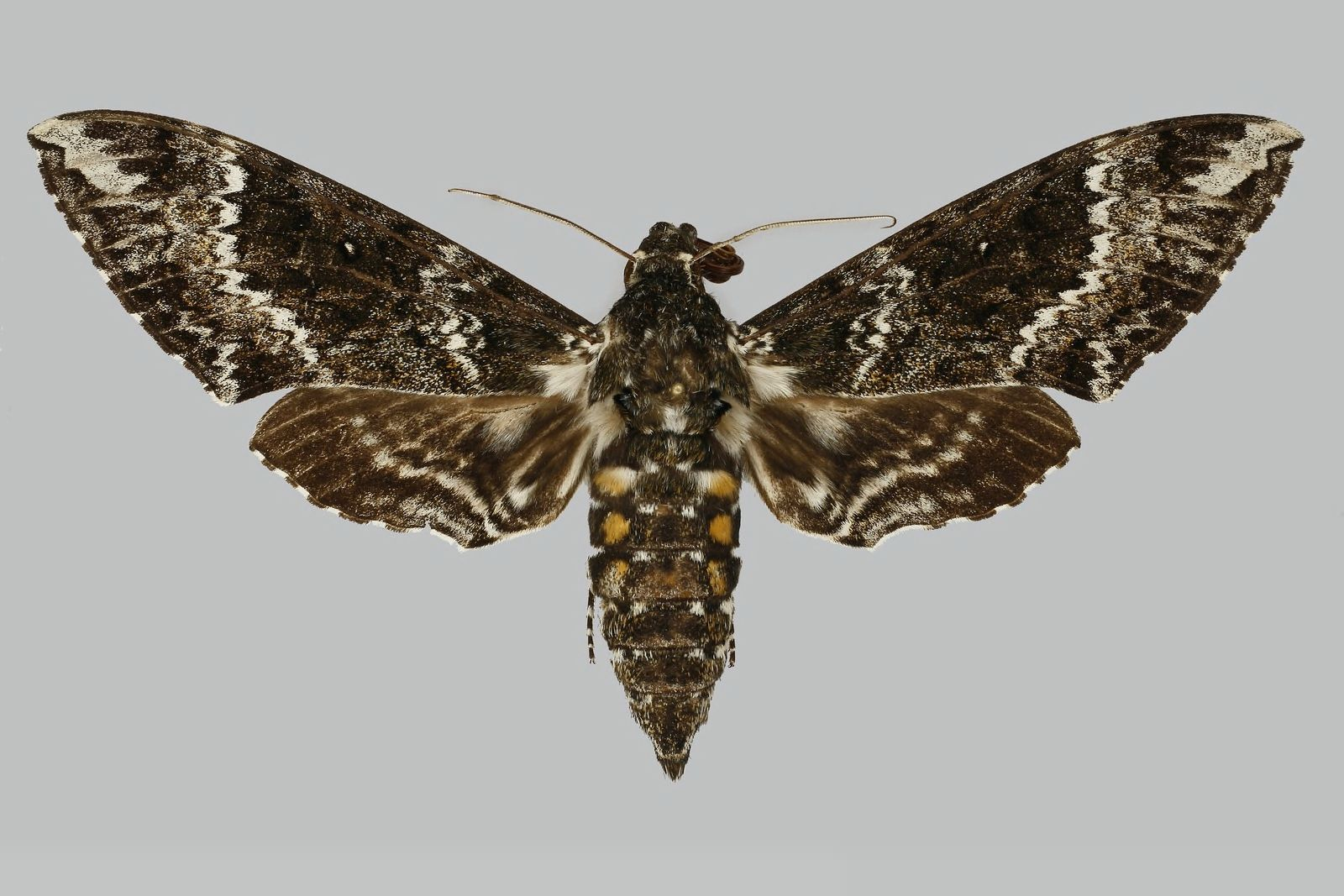
- Female

Scientific classification
- Kingdom: Animalia
- Phylum: Arthropoda
- Class: Insecta
- Order: Lepidoptera
- Family: Sphingidae
- Genus: Manduca
- Species: M. camposi

Binomial name
- Manduca camposi (Schaus, 1932)

Synonyms
- Protoparce camposi Schaus, 1932

= Manduca camposi =

Species of moth

Manduca camposi is a moth of the family Sphingidae. It is known from Ecuador.
