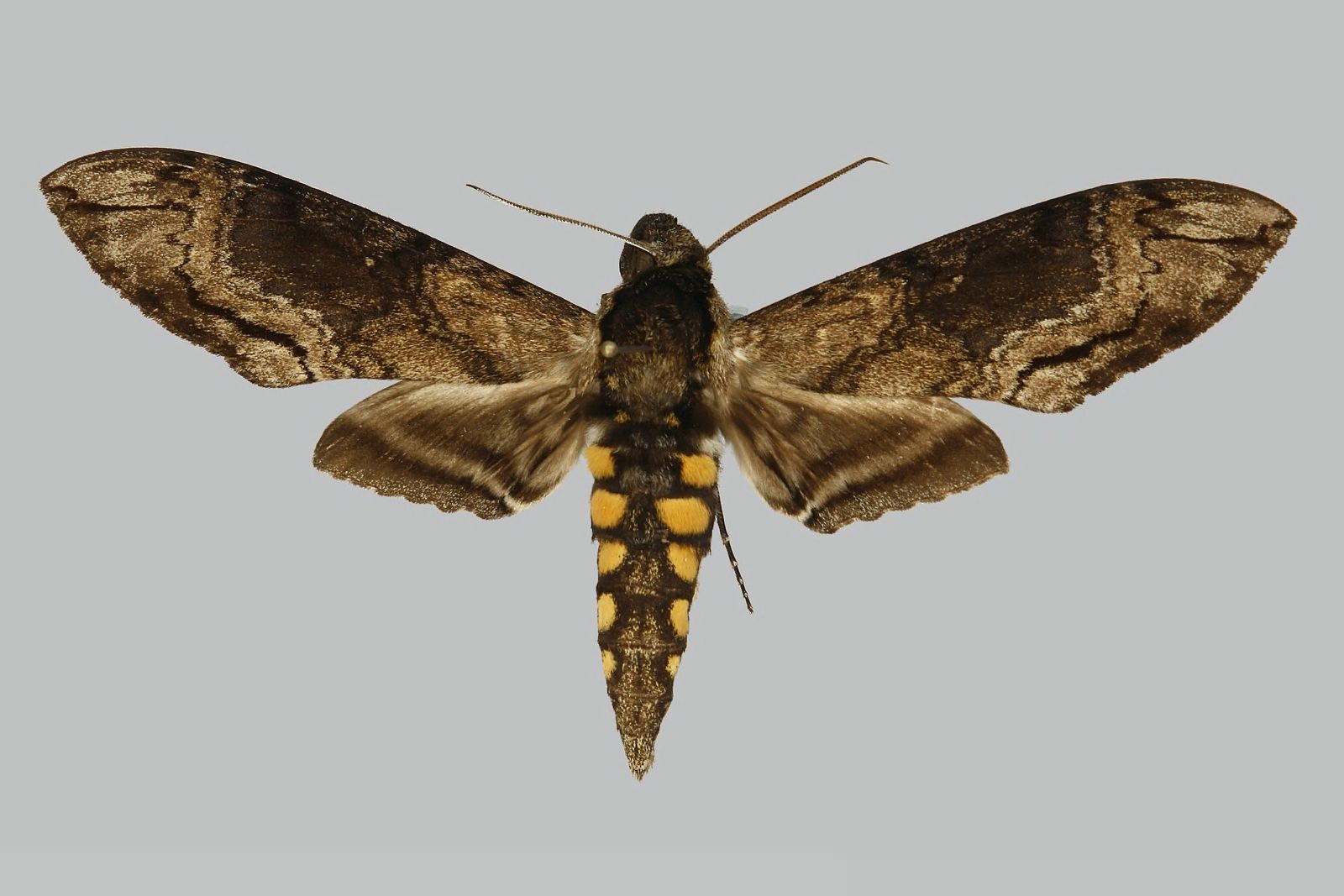
- Male

Scientific classification
- Kingdom: Animalia
- Phylum: Arthropoda
- Class: Insecta
- Order: Lepidoptera
- Family: Sphingidae
- Genus: Manduca
- Species: M. duquefi

Binomial name
- Manduca duquefi Haxaire & Vaglia, 2007

= Manduca duquefi =

Species of moth

Manduca duquefi is a moth of the family Sphingidae. It is known from French Guiana.
