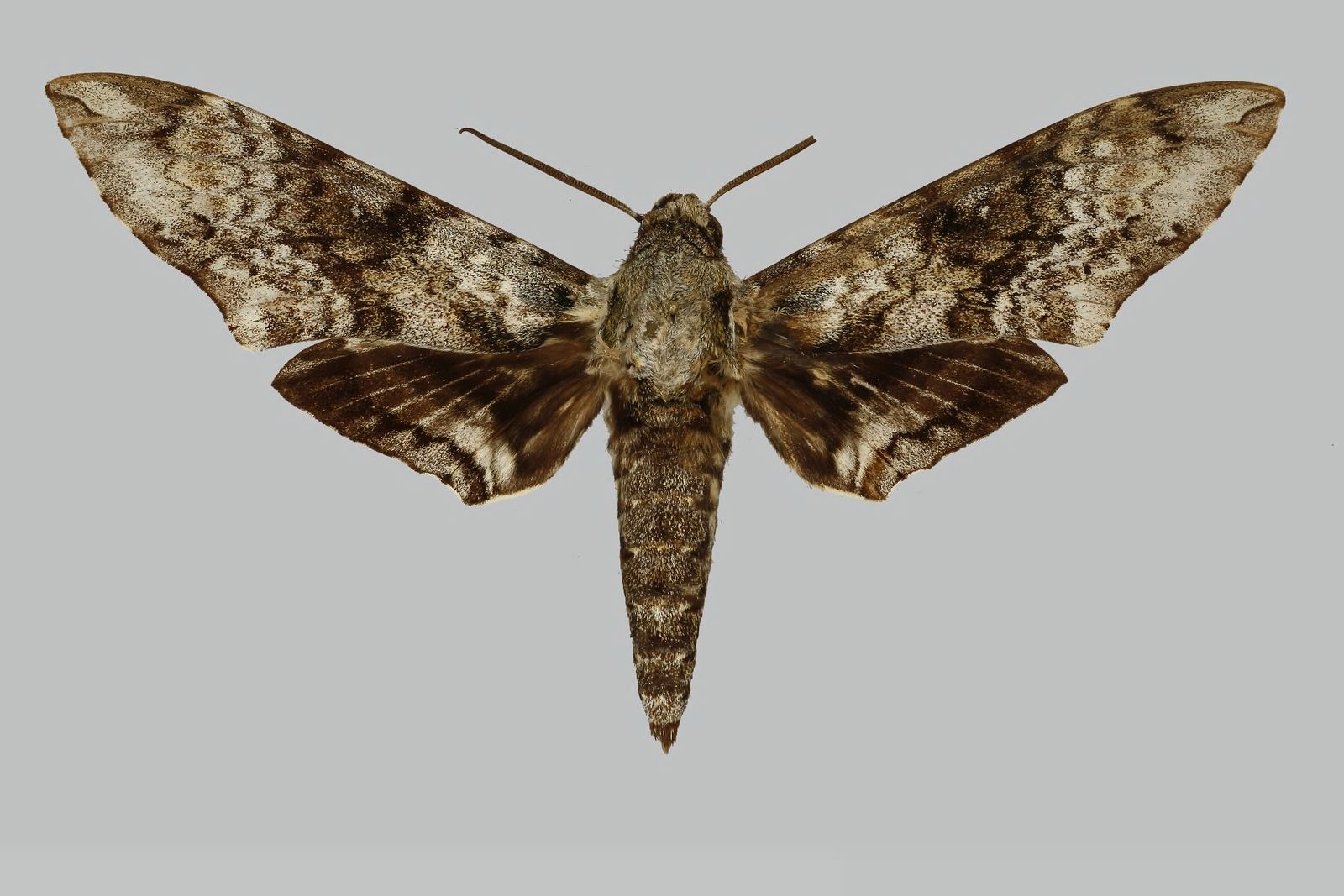
- Male

Scientific classification
- Kingdom: Animalia
- Phylum: Arthropoda
- Class: Insecta
- Order: Lepidoptera
- Family: Sphingidae
- Genus: Manduca
- Species: M. lamasi

Binomial name
- Manduca lamasi Eitschberger & Haxaire, 2007

= Manduca lamasi =

Species of moth

Manduca lamasi is a moth of the family of Sphingidae. It is known from Peru.
