= Antaeotricha chilosema =

Scientific classification
- Domain: Eukaryota
- Kingdom: Animalia
- Phylum: Arthropoda
- Class: Insecta
- Order: Lepidoptera
- Family: Depressariidae
- Genus: Antaeotricha
- Species: A. chilosema

Binomial name
- Antaeotricha chilosema (Meyrick, 1918)

Synonyms
- Stenoma chilosema Meyrick, 1918

Species of moth

Antaeotricha chilosema is a moth in the family Depressariidae. It was described by Edward Meyrick in 1918. It is found in French Guiana.

The wingspan is 19–20 mm. The forewings are light bronzy-greyish-ochreous, sometimes whitish-ochreous towards the costa anteriorly and with the costal edge whitish, marked on the posterior half with three extremely oblique dark fuscous strigulae and two suffused wedge-shaped marks, between veins 7 and 8 a small blackish spot indicating the true (not apparent) apex. There is an irregular dentate white streak beneath the posterior part of the costa, sometimes nearly obsolete. The terminal edge is white, with dark fuscous dots or marks between the veins. The hindwings are grey, paler and thinly scaled towards the base, with the veins dark fuscous and some white apical suffusion between veins 6-8.
