= Antaeotricha atmospora =

Scientific classification
- Kingdom: Animalia
- Phylum: Arthropoda
- Clade: Pancrustacea
- Class: Insecta
- Order: Lepidoptera
- Family: Depressariidae
- Genus: Antaeotricha
- Species: A. atmospora

Binomial name
- Antaeotricha atmospora (Meyrick, 1925)

Synonyms
- Stenoma atmospora Meyrick, 1925

Species of moth in genus Antaeotricha

Antaeotricha atmospora is a moth of the family Depressariidae. It is found in Colombia.

The wingspan is 38–39 mm. The forewings are pale greyish-ochreous sprinkled with dark brown specks, these forming a darker cloud towards the median area of the dorsum. The second discal stigma is rather large and dark fuscous and the terminal dots are sometimes slightly indicated. The hindwings are pale grey.
