= Antaeotricha staurota =

Scientific classification
- Domain: Eukaryota
- Kingdom: Animalia
- Phylum: Arthropoda
- Class: Insecta
- Order: Lepidoptera
- Family: Depressariidae
- Genus: Antaeotricha
- Species: A. staurota

Binomial name
- Antaeotricha staurota Meyrick, 1916

Species of moth

Antaeotricha staurota is a moth of the family Depressariidae. It is found in French Guiana.

The wingspan is about 23 mm. The forewings are white with grey markings. There is a broad irregular streak from the base of the costa along the upper margin of the cell, indistinctly interrupted before its middle, curved around two confluent dark grey dots at the end of the cell and continued more narrowly to the dorsum at four-fifths, indistinctly interrupted on the fold. There are spots on the dorsum at one-fourth and two-thirds, and one above the dorsum before the middle, as well as a somewhat curved subterminal line not nearly reaching the costa. There is also a streak along the termen not reaching the tornus. The hindwings are light grey, towards the base whitish-tinged and with the extreme apex whitish.
