= Antaeotricha ianthina =

Scientific classification
- Domain: Eukaryota
- Kingdom: Animalia
- Phylum: Arthropoda
- Class: Insecta
- Order: Lepidoptera
- Family: Depressariidae
- Genus: Antaeotricha
- Species: A. ianthina

Binomial name
- Antaeotricha ianthina (Walsingham, 1913)

Synonyms
- Stenoma ianthina Walsingham, 1913

Species of moth

Antaeotricha ianthina is a moth in the family Depressariidae. It was described by Thomas de Grey, 6th Baron Walsingham in 1913. It is found in Panama.

The wingspan is about 28 mm. The forewings are unicolorous rich shining purple, with greenish reflections at the extreme base, the costa and dorsum to two-thirds perhaps somewhat more richly coloured than the remainder of the wing. The hindwings are dark tawny grey, with some slight greenish and purplish reflections and a long pencil of pale ochreous hairs from near the base of the costa above.
