= Antaeotricha lunimaculata =

Scientific classification
- Domain: Eukaryota
- Kingdom: Animalia
- Phylum: Arthropoda
- Class: Insecta
- Order: Lepidoptera
- Family: Depressariidae
- Genus: Antaeotricha
- Species: A. lunimaculata

Binomial name
- Antaeotricha lunimaculata (Dognin, 1913)

Synonyms
- Stenoma lunimaculata Dognin, 1913

Species of moth

Antaeotricha lunimaculata is a moth in the family Depressariidae. It was described by Paul Dognin in 1913. It is found in Colombia.
