= Antaeotricha filiferella =

Scientific classification
- Kingdom: Animalia
- Phylum: Arthropoda
- Class: Insecta
- Order: Lepidoptera
- Family: Depressariidae
- Genus: Antaeotricha
- Species: A. filiferella

Binomial name
- Antaeotricha filiferella (Walker, 1864)

Synonyms
- Cryptolechia filiferella Walker, 1864; Gelechia niviliturella Walker, 1864; Stenoma menestella Walsingham, 1913

Species of moth

Antaeotricha filiferella is a moth in the family Depressariidae. It was described by Francis Walker in 1864. It is found in Amazonas in Brazil and in Panama.

The wingspan is about 13 mm. The forewings are dark slaty grey, with a white transverse streak, from a little beyond the middle of the costa, running obliquely outward with a slight curve to the outer third of the dorsum. On the extreme costa the white scales are diffused inward and outward for a short distance, and the streak is a little dilated above the dorsum. There is also a small white spot at the apex running through the cilia. The hindwings and cilia are dark brown, whitened along the costa toward the base.
