= Antaeotricha diffracta =

Scientific classification
- Domain: Eukaryota
- Kingdom: Animalia
- Phylum: Arthropoda
- Class: Insecta
- Order: Lepidoptera
- Family: Depressariidae
- Genus: Antaeotricha
- Species: A. diffracta

Binomial name
- Antaeotricha diffracta Meyrick, 1916

Species of moth

Antaeotricha diffracta is a moth of the family Depressariidae. It is found in French Guiana.

The wingspan is 17–18 mm. The forewings are white with dark fuscous markings. There is a short longitudinal mark from the base beneath the costa, two connected anteriorly near the base towards the dorsum, one above the middle at one-fourth, one beneath the fold and one on the dorsum slightly beyond this. A dentate line, interrupted above and below the middle is found from one-fourth of the costa to the middle of the dorsum and there is a longitudinal mark above the middle of the disc, and one beyond and beneath this. There is a rather irregular curved line from the middle of the costa to four-fifths of the dorsum and there are spots on the costa at three-fourths and near the apex, as well as a curved shade terminating in the tornus reaching two-thirds across the wing, connected with the preceding line by suffused bars at the upper end and near the dorsum. Eight blackish marginal dots are found around the apex and termen. The hindwings are ochreous-whitish, with some grey suffusion beneath vein 2 towards the extremity and the costa is expanded from the base to four-fifths, with long rough projecting hairscales suffused beneath with dark grey beyond the middle, and a long dense whitish subcostal hairpencil from the base lying in an ochreous groove concealed by the forewings.
