= Antaeotricha bathrotoma =

Scientific classification
- Kingdom: Animalia
- Phylum: Arthropoda
- Clade: Pancrustacea
- Class: Insecta
- Order: Lepidoptera
- Family: Depressariidae
- Genus: Antaeotricha
- Species: A. bathrotoma

Binomial name
- Antaeotricha bathrotoma (Meyrick, 1925)

Synonyms
- Stenoma bathrotoma Meyrick, 1925

Species of moth in genus Antaeotricha

Antaeotricha bathrotoma is a moth of the family Depressariidae. It is found in Pará, Brazil.

The wingspan is about 16 mm. The forewings are fuscous-whitish, the dorsal half more infuscated, with a short sinuate blackish mark from the base of the costa not quite reaching a short dark fuscous streak above the base of the dorsum. The first discal stigma is elongate, dark fuscous, from near it an irregular oblique dark fuscous line to the middle of the dorsum. There is an irregular slightly curved dark fuscous line from the middle of the costa to the dorsum at three-fourths thickened on the costa and on the lower half where it is followed by a broad band of fuscous suffusion. A thick dark fuscous line is found from the costa at four-fifths to the tornus, curved so as nearly to approach the termen on the lower half. There are six moderate dark fuscous dots around the apex and termen. The hindwings are whitish, towards the apex slightly greyish-tinged and with a yellowish-tinged subcostal groove.
