= Antaeotricha conturbatella =

Scientific classification
- Kingdom: Animalia
- Phylum: Arthropoda
- Class: Insecta
- Order: Lepidoptera
- Family: Depressariidae
- Genus: Antaeotricha
- Species: A. conturbatella

Binomial name
- Antaeotricha conturbatella (Walker, 1864)

Synonyms
- Cryptolechia conturbatella Walker, 1864; Cryptolechia illucidella Walker, 1864

Species of moth

Antaeotricha conturbatella is a moth in the family Depressariidae. It was described by Francis Walker in 1864. It is found in Amazonas in Brazil and in French Guiana.

Adults are brown, the forewings with various small cinereous (ash gray) marks. One-third of the length from the base is cinereous, with some brown marks. The submarginal and marginal lines are cinereous and denticulated, while the fringe is cinereous.
