= Antaeotricha trochoscia =

Scientific classification
- Kingdom: Animalia
- Phylum: Arthropoda
- Clade: Pancrustacea
- Class: Insecta
- Order: Lepidoptera
- Family: Depressariidae
- Genus: Antaeotricha
- Species: A. trochoscia

Binomial name
- Antaeotricha trochoscia Meyrick, 1915

Species of moth

Antaeotricha trochoscia is a moth in the family Depressariidae. It was described by Edward Meyrick in 1915. It is found in Guyana.

The wingspan is about 20 mm. The forewings are white with a grey spot on the dorsum at one-fourth, and a larger subtriangular dark grey blotch at three-fourths, as well as some irregular grey suffusion extending in the disc from one-third to three-fourths, appearing to be formed of segments of three oblique irregular transverse shades partially confluent. A grey curved shade from the tornus reaches two-thirds across the wing and there is some grey suffusion before the termen beneath the apex. The hindwings are light grey, tinged with whitish anteriorly and with the costal margin broadly expanded from the base to two-thirds, with short white scales beyond the middle, and a long whitish subcostal hairpeucil lying beneath the forewings.
