= Antaeotricha radicicola =

Scientific classification
- Kingdom: Animalia
- Phylum: Arthropoda
- Class: Insecta
- Order: Lepidoptera
- Family: Depressariidae
- Genus: Antaeotricha
- Species: A. radicicola

Binomial name
- Antaeotricha radicicola Meyrick, 1932

Species of moth

Antaeotricha radicicola is a moth in the family Depressariidae. It was described by Edward Meyrick in 1932. It is found in Peru.
