= Antaeotricha fasciatum =

Scientific classification
- Domain: Eukaryota
- Kingdom: Animalia
- Phylum: Arthropoda
- Class: Insecta
- Order: Lepidoptera
- Family: Depressariidae
- Genus: Antaeotricha
- Species: A. fasciatum

Binomial name
- Antaeotricha fasciatum (Busck, 1911)

Synonyms
- Stenoma fasciatum Busck, 1911

Species of moth

Antaeotricha fasciatum is a moth in the family Depressariidae. It was described by August Busck in 1911. It is found in French Guiana.

The wingspan is 21–24 mm. The forewings are light greyish ochreous with a broad blackish brown oblique fascia, this begins on the costa from the basal fourth to the middle of the costa and reaches to the middle of the dorsum. The edges are not even but reasonably parallel and sharply defined against the lighter basal and apical parts of the wing. At the apical third is an indistinct and ill-defined dark fuscous cloud parallel with the fascia and mainly noticeable by its outer edge, which appears as a dark, thin, undulating line from a small costal spot to the tornus. The hindwings are dark fuscous.
