= Antaeotricha paracrypta =

Scientific classification
- Domain: Eukaryota
- Kingdom: Animalia
- Phylum: Arthropoda
- Class: Insecta
- Order: Lepidoptera
- Family: Depressariidae
- Genus: Antaeotricha
- Species: A. paracrypta

Binomial name
- Antaeotricha paracrypta Meyrick, 1915

Species of moth

Antaeotricha paracrypta is a moth in the family Depressariidae. It was described by Edward Meyrick in 1915. It is found in Guyana.

The wingspan is about 15 mm. The forewings are grey with the costal edge white from one-fourth onwards and with a slender blackish streak from the base of the costa to one-fifth of the disc, and three cloudy blackish transverse lines, the first from one-fourth of the costa to beyond the middle of the dorsum, irregular, the second from the middle of the costa to four-fifths of the dorsum, slightly curved, irregular, with a median projection anteriorly and whitish-margined on each side of this or in females throughout, the third from three-fourths of the costa to the tornus, curved on the lower half, sometimes some whitish suffusion in the disc connecting the second and third, the area beyond the third suffused with ochreous-white, with eight blackish dots around the margin. The hindwings are dark grey, lighter anteriorly and with the costal margin in males somewhat expanded to three-fourths, with a long whitish subcostal hairpencil lying beneath the forewings.
