= Antaeotricha eucoma =

Scientific classification
- Domain: Eukaryota
- Kingdom: Animalia
- Phylum: Arthropoda
- Class: Insecta
- Order: Lepidoptera
- Family: Depressariidae
- Genus: Antaeotricha
- Species: A. eucoma

Binomial name
- Antaeotricha eucoma Meyrick, 1925

Species of moth

Antaeotricha eucoma is a moth in the family Depressariidae. It was described by Edward Meyrick in 1925. It is found in Brazil.

The wingspan is about 13 mm. The forewings are white with a greyish-ochreous basal patch suffusedly mixed dark fuscous and enclosing a white spot on the base of the costa, the edge running from one-fourth of the costa to the middle of the dorsum. There are two dark grey dots transversely placed on the end of the cell and a grey shade with short direct costal and dorsal sections slightly before these connected by a semicircular loop behind them. A slightly curved rather thicker grey shade is found from three-fourths of the costa to the dorsum before the tornus and there are five cloudy dark fuscous dots occupying the excavations of a waved white line around the apex and termen preceded by fuscous suffusion. The hindwings are light grey, with the apex slenderly white and the costa expanded on the basal half, clothed with white scales to near the apex, and with an antemedian projection of grey scales and a white subcostal hairpencil from the base reaching to three-fourths.
