= Antaeotricha innexa =

Scientific classification
- Domain: Eukaryota
- Kingdom: Animalia
- Phylum: Arthropoda
- Class: Insecta
- Order: Lepidoptera
- Family: Depressariidae
- Genus: Antaeotricha
- Species: A. innexa

Binomial name
- Antaeotricha innexa (Meyrick, 1925)

Synonyms
- Stenoma innexa Meyrick, 1925

Species of moth

Antaeotricha innexa is a moth of the family Depressariidae. It is found in Peru.

The wingspan is 16–19 mm. The forewings are light grey, the costal edge ochreous-whitish and with a short dark fuscous mark from the base of the costa and some indistinct suffusion above the base of the dorsum. There are three rather irregular oblique transverse dark fuscous lines, the first from one-fourth of the costa to the middle of the dorsum, the second from the middle of the costa to the dorsum at four-fifths, traversing the darker second discal stigma, the third from three-fourths of the costa, slightly sinuate and curved round beneath to the tornus. There are eight blackish marginal dots or marks around the posterior part of the costa and termen. The hindwings are rather dark grey.
