= Antaeotricha albicilla =

Scientific classification
- Kingdom: Animalia
- Phylum: Arthropoda
- Clade: Pancrustacea
- Class: Insecta
- Order: Lepidoptera
- Family: Depressariidae
- Genus: Antaeotricha
- Species: A. albicilla

Binomial name
- Antaeotricha albicilla (Zeller, 1854)

Synonyms
- Cryptolechia albicilla Zeller, 1854

Species of moth in genus Antaeotricha

Antaeotricha albicilla is a moth in the family Depressariidae. It was described by Philipp Christoph Zeller in 1854. It is found in Venezuela.
