= Antaeotricha mendax =

Scientific classification
- Kingdom: Animalia
- Phylum: Arthropoda
- Clade: Pancrustacea
- Class: Insecta
- Order: Lepidoptera
- Family: Depressariidae
- Genus: Antaeotricha
- Species: A. mendax

Binomial name
- Antaeotricha mendax (Zeller, 1855)

Synonyms
- Cryptolechia mendax Zeller, 1855; Stenoma crypsithias Meyrick, 1930

Species of moth

Antaeotricha mendax is a moth in the family Depressariidae. It was described by Philipp Christoph Zeller in 1855. It is found in Brazil (Minas Gerais), Panama and Peru.

The wingspan is about 19 mm.
