= Antaeotricha adornata =

Scientific classification
- Kingdom: Animalia
- Phylum: Arthropoda
- Clade: Pancrustacea
- Class: Insecta
- Order: Lepidoptera
- Family: Depressariidae
- Genus: Antaeotricha
- Species: A. adornata

Binomial name
- Antaeotricha adornata (Meyrick, 1915)

Synonyms
- Stenoma adornata Meyrick, 1915

Species of moth in genus Antaeotricha

Antaeotricha adornata is a moth of the family Depressariidae. It is found in Peru.

The wingspan is about 18 mm. The forewings are dark violet-fuscous with the extreme costal edge yellow-ochreous from the base to the bend and with an ochreous-whitish longitudinal dash from the base of the costa, in which is an elongate dark fuscous dot. The second discal stigma is black with a series of pre-marginal violet marks around the posterior part of the costa and termen, alternating with a marginal series of indistinct pale yellowish marks. The hindwings are blackish.
