= Antaeotricha tumens =

Scientific classification
- Domain: Eukaryota
- Kingdom: Animalia
- Phylum: Arthropoda
- Class: Insecta
- Order: Lepidoptera
- Family: Depressariidae
- Genus: Antaeotricha
- Species: A. tumens

Binomial name
- Antaeotricha tumens (Meyrick, 1916)

Synonyms
- Stenoma tumens Meyrick, 1916

Species of moth

Antaeotricha tumens is a moth of the family Depressariidae. It is found in French Guiana.

The wingspan is about 17 mm. The forewings are fuscous-whitish, with a faint lilac tinge, white on the costal edge and between the veins posteriorly. There is a fuscous basal dot in the middle, and a short oblique mark above the base of the dorsum and three cloudy dark fuscous oblique transverse lines, the second and third triangularly dilated on the costa, the first from one-fifth of the costa to the middle of the dorsum, slightly curved, the second from the middle of the costa to four-fifths of the dorsum, slightly sinuate outwards in the middle, the third from three-fourths of the costa to the tornus, curved outwards on the lower half, the dorsal area between this and the second partially suffused with fuscous. There are eight marginal dots around the apex and termen. The hindwings are whitish with the costa broadly expanded and clothed with rough projecting white scales from the base to two-thirds, beyond this abruptly sinuate-incised. There is also a yellowish subcostal finely striated groove from the base to three-fifths.
