= Antaeotricha tectoria =

Scientific classification
- Domain: Eukaryota
- Kingdom: Animalia
- Phylum: Arthropoda
- Class: Insecta
- Order: Lepidoptera
- Family: Depressariidae
- Genus: Antaeotricha
- Species: A. tectoria

Binomial name
- Antaeotricha tectoria (Meyrick, 1915)

Synonyms
- Stenoma tectoria Meyrick, 1915

Species of moth

Antaeotricha tectoria is a moth of the family Depressariidae. It is found in Guyana, French Guiana and Brazil.

The wingspan is 32–33 mm. The forewings are ochreous-whitish with the dorsal three-fifths pale ochreous-grey and with a trapezoidal blotch of dark grey suffusion on the dorsum about two-thirds, not reaching half across the wing. The hindwings are grey.
