= Antaeotricha gypsoterma =

Scientific classification
- Domain: Eukaryota
- Kingdom: Animalia
- Phylum: Arthropoda
- Class: Insecta
- Order: Lepidoptera
- Family: Depressariidae
- Genus: Antaeotricha
- Species: A. gypsoterma

Binomial name
- Antaeotricha gypsoterma (Meyrick, 1915)

Synonyms
- Stenoma gypsoterma Meyrick, 1915

Species of moth

Antaeotricha gypsoterma is a moth of the family Depressariidae. It is found in Guyana.

The wingspan is about 16 mm. The forewings are rather dark grey, the costa suffused with white throughout and with three very oblique linear black marks on the costa at one-fourth, the middle, and three-fourths, giving rise to cloudy irregular oblique dark fuscous lines crossing the wing, the second line edged with a whitish mark anteriorly below the middle, the third somewhat sinuate above the middle and rather curved below, running to the tornus, the area beyond this wholly ochreous-white, with six large blackish dots or marks around the apical and terminal margin. The hindwings are grey.
