= Antaeotricha percnogona =

Scientific classification
- Domain: Eukaryota
- Kingdom: Animalia
- Phylum: Arthropoda
- Class: Insecta
- Order: Lepidoptera
- Family: Depressariidae
- Genus: Antaeotricha
- Species: A. percnogona

Binomial name
- Antaeotricha percnogona Meyrick, 1925

Species of moth

Antaeotricha percnogona is a moth in the family Depressariidae. It was described by Edward Meyrick in 1925. It is found in Peru.

The wingspan is about 13 mm. The forewings are dark grey, with the extreme costal edge partially white and with short cloudy dark fuscous oblique streaks from the costa at one-third, beyond the middle, and three-fourths, from beyond the last a very fine straight line of whitish scales runs to the termen above the tornus and there are some cloudy dark fuscous marginal dots around the apex and upper part of the termen. The hindwings are dark grey, with the costa expanded from the base to three-fourths and with a whitish subcostal hairpencil from the apex to beyond the middle.
