= Antaeotricha infrenata =

Scientific classification
- Domain: Eukaryota
- Kingdom: Animalia
- Phylum: Arthropoda
- Class: Insecta
- Order: Lepidoptera
- Family: Depressariidae
- Genus: Antaeotricha
- Species: A. infrenata

Binomial name
- Antaeotricha infrenata (Meyrick, 1918)

Synonyms
- Stenoma infrenata Meyrick, 1918

Species of moth

Antaeotricha infrenata is a moth of the family Depressariidae. It is found in French Guiana.

The wingspan is about 17 mm for males and about 20 mm for females. The forewings are glossy light grey with the costal edge whitish and with three rather irregular oblique slightly curved dark fuscous transverse lines, the first from one-fifth of the costa to the middle of the dorsum, the second from the middle of the costa to four-fifths of the dorsum and the third from four-fifths of the costa to the tornus. There is a marginal series of dark fuscous marks or dots around the apical part of the costa and termen, in females there is also some dark grey suffusion towards the basal portion of the dorsum and following dorsal portions of the first two lines. The hindwings are grey.
