= Antaeotricha fulta =

Scientific classification
- Kingdom: Animalia
- Phylum: Arthropoda
- Class: Insecta
- Order: Lepidoptera
- Family: Depressariidae
- Genus: Antaeotricha
- Species: A. fulta

Binomial name
- Antaeotricha fulta Meyrick, 1926

Species of moth

Antaeotricha fulta is a moth of the family Depressariidae. It is found in Colombia. The holotype was collected at an altitude of 2,910 m (9,550 ft).

== Description ==
The wingspan is about 27 mm. The forewings are white, with the basal area tinged grey and with a small dark fuscous mark on the base of the costa. Towards the dorsum anteriorly are two roundish light grey spots partially edged darker grey. There is an oblique rather dark fuscous fascia including a light greyish shade and tinged green-yellowish posteriorly from one-fifth of the costa to a darker elongate blotch occupying the median third of the dorsum and crossed by two fine angulated lines of white irroration. There are about seven cloudy greyish spots in the disc between the middle and the apex, and a larger one just before the tornus. The hindwings are light grey, with the base whitish and the costa expanded on the anterior half, with a dense projecting fringe of dark grey hairscales tipped white, with a white subcostal hairpencil not reaching the middle.
