= Antaeotricha corvigera =

Scientific classification
- Domain: Eukaryota
- Kingdom: Animalia
- Phylum: Arthropoda
- Class: Insecta
- Order: Lepidoptera
- Family: Depressariidae
- Genus: Antaeotricha
- Species: A. corvigera

Binomial name
- Antaeotricha corvigera Meyrick, 1915

Species of moth

Antaeotricha corvigera is a moth of the family Depressariidae first described by Edward Meyrick in 1915. It is found in Guyana and Peru.

The wingspan is about 19 mm. The forewings are white with an irregular dark fuscous streak from the base of the costa to the disc at one-fourth, its apex forming an angulated hook above and a sharp projection beneath. There is a small dark fuscous mark on the costa before one-fourth and an oblique curved dark fuscous mark on the end of the cell, as well as a more or less interrupted fuscous and dark fuscous line from the middle of the costa to three-fourths of the dorsum excurved behind this. A small dark fuscous spot is found on the costa near the apex and sometimes there are two series of faint pale greyish spots towards the termen. A series of dark fuscous marks is found around the posterior half of the costa, termen and tornus. The hindwings are ochreous whitish with the costal margin expanded from the base to three-fifths, with long rough projecting hairscales, whitish above and dark grey beneath, and also with a projection of scales at four-fifths, so as to appear excavated between these, and with a long subcostal pencil of pale ochreous-yellowish hairs lying beneath the forewings. The apical margin is marked interruptedly with dark fuscous.
