= Antaeotricha humerella =

Scientific classification
- Kingdom: Animalia
- Phylum: Arthropoda
- Class: Insecta
- Order: Lepidoptera
- Family: Depressariidae
- Genus: Antaeotricha
- Species: A. humerella

Binomial name
- Antaeotricha humerella (Walker, 1864)

Synonyms
- Cryptolechia humerella Walker, 1864; Cryptolechia intermedia Felder & Rogenhofer, 1875; Cryptolechia luscina Zeller, 1877; Stenoma meridiana Meyrick, 1915

Species of moth

Antaeotricha humerella is a moth of the family Depressariidae. It is found in Brazil (Amazonas), French Guiana, Guyana and Panama.

The wingspan is about 24 mm. The forewings are violet-brownish-ochreous, towards the costa yellower-tinged and with a violet-brown line along the costa throughout, from one-third to four-fifths, edged beneath with some slender obscure violet-whitish suffusion. The first discal stigma is dark fuscous, the second hardly infuscated. The hindwings are grey, the apical fifth suffused with ochreous-yellow.
