= Antaeotricha inquinula =

Scientific classification
- Kingdom: Animalia
- Phylum: Arthropoda
- Clade: Pancrustacea
- Class: Insecta
- Order: Lepidoptera
- Family: Depressariidae
- Genus: Antaeotricha
- Species: A. inquinula

Binomial name
- Antaeotricha inquinula Zeller, 1854

Species of moth

Antaeotricha inquinula is a moth in the family Depressariidae. It was described by Philipp Christoph Zeller in 1854. It is found in Brazil.
