= Antaeotricha phryactis =

Scientific classification
- Domain: Eukaryota
- Kingdom: Animalia
- Phylum: Arthropoda
- Class: Insecta
- Order: Lepidoptera
- Family: Depressariidae
- Genus: Antaeotricha
- Species: A. phryactis

Binomial name
- Antaeotricha phryactis Meyrick, 1925

Species of moth

Antaeotricha phryactis is a moth in the family Depressariidae. It was described by Edward Meyrick in 1925. It is found in Peru and Brazil.

The wingspan is about 25 mm. The forewings are white with an oblong fuscous basal patch slightly sprinkled whitish extending on the dorsum to near the middle but only occupying one-sixth of the costa. The discal stigmata are rather large and dark fuscous, the first nearly resting on the edge of this, a similar subcostal dot above it, the second blackish circled white and then surrounded except in the middle posteriorly by an irregular grey cloud streaked darker above it and connected with the costa at one-third by an oblique shade, and with the dorsum by two direct shades. A slightly curved suffused grey streak is found from two-thirds of the costa to the dorsum before the tornus interrupted in the middle. There is a grey marginal fascia around the apex and upper three-fourths of the termen narrowed to the extremities, and a marginal series of cloudy dark fuscous dots around the posterior part of the costa and termen. The hindwings are grey, the costal area snow-white to four-fifths, and the dorsal area rather broadly suffused white, the apical margin suffused chestnut-brown, with a white dot at the apex and the costa expanded on the basal half, with long white projecting hairscales almost to the apex, and very large broad median projection of long grey hairscales reaching to three-fourths of the forewings, and some white hairs from the base beneath the costa.
