= Antaeotricha biarcuata =

Scientific classification
- Kingdom: Animalia
- Phylum: Arthropoda
- Clade: Pancrustacea
- Class: Insecta
- Order: Lepidoptera
- Family: Depressariidae
- Genus: Antaeotricha
- Species: A. biarcuata

Binomial name
- Antaeotricha biarcuata Meyrick, 1926

Synonyms
- Antaeotricha stenobathra Meyrick, 1932; Stenoma vogli Amsel, 1956

Species of moth in genus Antaeotricha

Antaeotricha biarcuata is a moth of the family Depressariidae. It is found in Colombia, Venezuela, Panama, and Trinidad. Notice that all but the Colombian record refer to Antaeotricha stenobathra, which is considered a valid species by the Global Lepidoptera Index.

== Description ==
The wingspan is 18–20 mm. The forewings are white, partially with a slight ochreous tinge and with a patch of dark purple-fuscous mottling on the basal fourth of the dorsum, just reaching the costa at the base, with the projecting scales of the dorsum coppery-fulvous. There is an interrupted dentate grey line from one-fourth of the costa to the middle of the dorsum, furcate towards the dorsum. The second discal stigma is blackish and there is a grey shade from the costa beyond the middle to before this, then angled upwards over it and again beyond, and running to the tornus. A subquadrate blotch of dark fuscous mottling is found on the dorsum before the tornus and there is some grey suffusion along the upper part of the termen. The hindwings are ochreous-whitish with the costa somewhat dilated anteriorly, with a broad projection of dark grey white-tipped hairscales before the middle, and a whitish-ochreous subcostal hairpencil from the base to beyond the middle.
