= Antaeotricha generatrix =

Scientific classification
- Domain: Eukaryota
- Kingdom: Animalia
- Phylum: Arthropoda
- Class: Insecta
- Order: Lepidoptera
- Family: Depressariidae
- Genus: Antaeotricha
- Species: A. generatrix

Binomial name
- Antaeotricha generatrix Meyrick, 1926

Species of moth

Antaeotricha generatrix is a moth of the family Depressariidae. It is found in Brazil (Rio Grande do Sul).

The wingspan is about 17 mm. The forewings are greyish with a small dark fuscous basal patch, very narrow on the costa, from beyond this an irregular white streak along the costa to three-fourths, then diverging as a curved fasciate streak to the tornus. There is a small grey spot on the costa at one-fourth and beneath the middle of the costa a cloud of blackish-grey suffusion, margined by white suffusion, and then laterally towards the costa by some pale yellowish suffusion, also more suffusedly extended beneath it as an undefined fascia to the middle of the dorsum. The discal stigmata are ill-defined and blackish, the white suffusion extending to these, the first preceded by slight pale yellowish suffusion. The hindwings are pale grey, the costa expanded on the basal three-fourths with a long projecting fringe of pale ochreous-yellowish white-tipped hairscales. There is a whitish-ochreous subcostal hairpencil from the base to three-fifths.
