= Antaeotricha heterosaris =

Scientific classification
- Domain: Eukaryota
- Kingdom: Animalia
- Phylum: Arthropoda
- Class: Insecta
- Order: Lepidoptera
- Family: Depressariidae
- Genus: Antaeotricha
- Species: A. heterosaris

Binomial name
- Antaeotricha heterosaris (Meyrick, 1915)

Synonyms
- Stenoma heterosaris Meyrick, 1915

Species of moth

Antaeotricha heterosaris is a moth of the family Depressariidae. It is found in Guyana and French Guiana.

The wingspan is about 15 mm. The forewings are white with a series of three dark fuscous marks from the base of the costa to the disc at one-fourth. The dorsal half is suffused with pale fuscous throughout, with a suffused dark fuscous streak along the basal fourth, an undefined median quadrate blotch, and a larger quadrate blotch before the tornus reaching more than half across the wing. A dark fuscous dot is found in the disc towards the costa beyond the middle and there is a slightly curved dark fuscous line from three-fourths of the costa to the posterior angle of the pre-tornal blotch. The terminal space beyond this is crossed by suffused dark fuscous streaks on the veins, with suffused dark fuscous marginal dots between them. The hindwings are grey-whitish, suffused with pale grey posteriorly and with a long whitish hairpencil, basally yellow-ochreous, enclosed in a subdorsal fold.
