= Antaeotricha capsulata =

Scientific classification
- Kingdom: Animalia
- Phylum: Arthropoda
- Clade: Pancrustacea
- Class: Insecta
- Order: Lepidoptera
- Family: Depressariidae
- Genus: Antaeotricha
- Species: A. capsulata

Binomial name
- Antaeotricha capsulata Meyrick, 1918

Species of moth

Antaeotricha capsulata is a moth of the family Depressariidae. It is found in French Guiana.

The wingspan is about 18 mm. The forewings are pale ochreous-yellowish, the costal edge whitish and with a faint pale greyish clouding indicating a short oblique streak from the costa at one-fifth, an oblique fasciate streak from the costa before the middle expanded into a roundish patch in the disc, and a curved oblique fasciate streak near the apical part of the costa and upper part of the termen. There is a transverse irregular suffused rather dark grey shade on the dorsal half of the wing at one-third, nearly preceded by a roundish pale grey cloud. There is a somewhat ocellate patch from the dorsum before the tornus reaching rather more than half across the wing, edged anteriorly by an irregular rather dark grey line and posteriorly by a cloudy lighter grey shade dilated downwards. A cloudy grey somewhat dotted marginal line is found on the lower part of the termen. The hindwings are grey-whitish with the costal area rather expanded on the basal three-fifths, a whitish-grey-ochreous subcostal hairpencil from the base to three-fifths, lying in a shallow ochreous-grey streak-like groove.
