= Antaeotricha crypsiphaea =

Scientific classification
- Domain: Eukaryota
- Kingdom: Animalia
- Phylum: Arthropoda
- Class: Insecta
- Order: Lepidoptera
- Family: Depressariidae
- Genus: Antaeotricha
- Species: A. crypsiphaea

Binomial name
- Antaeotricha crypsiphaea (Meyrick, 1925)

Synonyms
- Stenoma crypsiphaea Meyrick, 1925

Species of moth

Antaeotricha crypsiphaea is a moth of the family Depressariidae. It is found in Brazil (Para).

The wingspan is about 19 mm. The forewings are fuscous-whitish, more infuscated on the dorsal half with no basal markings. There are two small cloudy dark fuscous spots very obliquely placed in the disc at one-third, from these an irregular gradually expanded fuscous shade to the middle of the dorsum. There is an irregular slightly curved fuscous line from the middle of the costa to the dorsum at four-fifths, and a similar line more curved on the lower half from the costa at two-thirds to the tornus, the dorsal area between these more infuscated. There nine dark fuscous marginal marks around the posterior part of the costa and termen. The hindwings are whitish, tinged grey towards the apex.
