= Antaeotricha suffumigata =

Scientific classification
- Domain: Eukaryota
- Kingdom: Animalia
- Phylum: Arthropoda
- Class: Insecta
- Order: Lepidoptera
- Family: Depressariidae
- Genus: Antaeotricha
- Species: A. suffumigata

Binomial name
- Antaeotricha suffumigata Walsingham, 1897

Species of moth

Antaeotricha suffumigata is a moth of the family Depressariidae, described by Walsingham in 1897. It is endemic to Grenada.

The wingspan is 16–20 mm.
