= Antaeotricha acronephela =

Scientific classification
- Kingdom: Animalia
- Phylum: Arthropoda
- Clade: Pancrustacea
- Class: Insecta
- Order: Lepidoptera
- Family: Depressariidae
- Genus: Antaeotricha
- Species: A. acronephela

Binomial name
- Antaeotricha acronephela Meyrick, 1915

Species of moth in genus Antaeotricha

Antaeotricha acronephela is a moth of the family Depressariidae. It is found in Guyana.

The wingspan is about 18 mm. The forewings are white, tinged with ochreous in the centre of the disc with a dark grey streak along the costa from the base, with four irregular suffused lighter projections between the base and two-thirds, posteriorly merged in a dark grey blotch occupying the apical third of the wing and crossed by an indistinct whitish shade from five-sixths of the costa to the tornus. There are two dark fuscous dots in the disc on the anterior edge of this blotch, behind which is some slight whitish irroration. There are three short indistinct bars of greyish suffusion from the dorsum between one-third and the blotch. There is a white denticulate line along the termen. The hindwings are pale grey, towards the base whitish-tinged and with a long whitish-ochreous subcostal hairpencil lying beneath the forewings.
