= Antaeotricha glycerostoma =

Scientific classification
- Domain: Eukaryota
- Kingdom: Animalia
- Phylum: Arthropoda
- Class: Insecta
- Order: Lepidoptera
- Family: Depressariidae
- Genus: Antaeotricha
- Species: A. glycerostoma

Binomial name
- Antaeotricha glycerostoma Meyrick, 1915

Species of moth

Antaeotricha glycerostoma is a moth in the family Depressariidae. Described by Edward Meyrick in 1915, the family of Depressariidae is found in Colombia.

The wingspan is about 26 mm. The forewings are ochreous-white with a grey basal patch occupying one-fourth of the wing, with a central interrupted darker grey shade, the dorsal half beyond this grey throughout, cut by two fine irregular oblique whitish lines before and beyond the middle, confluent with an irregular subquadrate grey blotch in the disc beyond the cell, marked with two blackish dots transversely placed on the end of the cell, its upper anterior angle connected by a narrow projection with the costa beyond the middle. Immediately beyond this is a light grey shade not rising above it, separated by a whitish line from a narrow grey terminal fascia widest at the apex. The hindwings are grey with the costal margin somewhat expanded to the middle, with long rough projecting hairscales suffused with grey beneath, and a moderately long ochreous-whitish subcostal hairpencil lying beneath the forewings.
