= Antaeotricha axena =

Scientific classification
- Kingdom: Animalia
- Phylum: Arthropoda
- Clade: Pancrustacea
- Class: Insecta
- Order: Lepidoptera
- Family: Depressariidae
- Genus: Antaeotricha
- Species: A. axena

Binomial name
- Antaeotricha axena Meyrick, 1916

Species of moth in genus Antaeotricha

Antaeotricha axena is a moth of the family Depressariidae. It is found in French Guiana.

The wingspan is 21–22 mm. The forewings are fuscous-grey, lighter towards the costa and posteriorly, the veins beyond the cell obscurely suffused with whitish, the costal edge white except towards the base and the apical area beyond the posterior line wholly white. There are three very undefined suffused darker fuscous blotches occupying the dorsal area except the narrow interspaces, reaching about one-third across the wing. There are also three somewhat irregular oblique dark fuscous lines rising from the suffused spots on the costa, the first two partially edged anteriorly with white suffusion, the first running to the upper anterior angle of the second dorsal blotch, the second slightly curved, to the upper anterior angle of the third dorsal blotch, the third somewhat sinuate, to its posterior angle. There are also five dark fuscous marginal dots around the apex and termen. The hindwings are grey, the costa is somewhat expanded from the base to two-thirds, with a long whitish subcostal hairpencil from the base lying beneath the forewings.
