= Antaeotricha diplophaea =

Scientific classification
- Domain: Eukaryota
- Kingdom: Animalia
- Phylum: Arthropoda
- Class: Insecta
- Order: Lepidoptera
- Family: Depressariidae
- Genus: Antaeotricha
- Species: A. diplophaea

Binomial name
- Antaeotricha diplophaea Meyrick, 1916

Species of moth

Antaeotricha diplophaea is a species of moth of the family Depressariidae. It is found in French Guiana.

The wingspan is 17–18 mm for males and about 22 mm for females. The forewings are white with a suffused grey blotch mixed with dark grey occupying the costal half from the base to one-third, the outer edge slightly oblique. A broad irregular grey streak proceeding from this above the upper margin of the cell, projecting upwards in the middle of the wing, curved more broadly around a small dark fuscous spot on the end of the cell and uniting with a broad irregular streak along the dorsum from the base almost to the tornus, which is marked with a suffused dark fuscous spot at one-third and an indistinct dark spot beyond the middle, these streaks indistinctly connected before the middle. There is also a narrow cloudy grey spot on the costa at three-fourths and a thick grey streak along the termen not reaching the tornus. The hindwings are grey, paler towards the base and with the costa rather expanded from the base to three-fourths, with a broad projection of long rough scales suffused with grey beneath, and a long grey-whitish subcostal hairpencil from the base in the groove lying beneath the forewings.
