= Antaeotricha carabodes =

Scientific classification
- Domain: Eukaryota
- Kingdom: Animalia
- Phylum: Arthropoda
- Class: Insecta
- Order: Lepidoptera
- Family: Depressariidae
- Genus: Antaeotricha
- Species: A. carabodes

Binomial name
- Antaeotricha carabodes (Meyrick, 1915)

Synonyms
- Stenoma carabodes Meyrick, 1915

Species of moth

Antaeotricha carabodes is a moth of the family Depressariidae. It is found in Guyana.

The wingspan is about 23 mm. The forewings are deep greyish-purple and the hindwings are blackish-grey.
