= Antaeotricha compsoneura =

Scientific classification
- Domain: Eukaryota
- Kingdom: Animalia
- Phylum: Arthropoda
- Class: Insecta
- Order: Lepidoptera
- Family: Depressariidae
- Genus: Antaeotricha
- Species: A. compsoneura

Binomial name
- Antaeotricha compsoneura (Meyrick, 1925)

Synonyms
- Stenoma compsoneura Meyrick, 1925

Species of moth

Antaeotricha compsoneura is a moth of the family Depressariidae. It is found in Brazil (Para) and French Guiana.

The wingspan is 16–17 mm. The forewings are whitish-ochreous, all veins marked with pale brownish lines. The second discal stigma is blackish and there is a marginal series of blackish dots around the apex and termen. The hindwings are whitish-grey.
