= Antaeotricha gymnolopha =

Scientific classification
- Domain: Eukaryota
- Kingdom: Animalia
- Phylum: Arthropoda
- Class: Insecta
- Order: Lepidoptera
- Family: Depressariidae
- Genus: Antaeotricha
- Species: A. gymnolopha

Binomial name
- Antaeotricha gymnolopha Meyrick, 1925

Species of moth

Antaeotricha gymnolopha is a species of moth in the family Depressariidae. It was described by Edward Meyrick in 1925. It is found in Brazil.

The wingspan is 15–16 mm. The forewings are whitish-ochreous, the dorsal half tinged and slightly speckled fuscous. From just beneath the basal half of the costa is a very dense downwards-directed brushlike fringe of whitish-ochreous hairscales and there is an indistinct dark fuscous mark on the base of the costa and dash on the fold towards the base. There is some fuscous suffusion towards the dorsum at one-fourth. The stigmata are moderate and dark fuscous, the plical obliquely beyond the first discal, these connected by slight suffusion with an oblique triangular suffused fuscous spot from the dorsum beyond the middle, the second discal traversed by a somewhat sinuate dark fuscous line from the middle of the costa terminating in a similar smaller spot towards the tornus. There is an oblique dark fuscous line from the costa at three-fourths curved around at the extremity to the tornus. Six cloudy dark fuscous dots are found around the apex and termen, largest at the apex. The hindwings are pale grey, with a large pale greyish-ochreous expansible subcostal hairpencil from the base.
