= Antaeotricha ithytona =

Scientific classification
- Kingdom: Animalia
- Phylum: Arthropoda
- Clade: Pancrustacea
- Class: Insecta
- Order: Lepidoptera
- Family: Depressariidae
- Genus: Antaeotricha
- Species: A. ithytona

Binomial name
- Antaeotricha ithytona Meyrick, 1929

Species of moth

Antaeotricha ithytona is a moth in the family Depressariidae. It was described by Edward Meyrick in 1929. It is found in Colombia.
