= Antaeotricha gubernatrix =

Scientific classification
- Domain: Eukaryota
- Kingdom: Animalia
- Phylum: Arthropoda
- Class: Insecta
- Order: Lepidoptera
- Family: Depressariidae
- Genus: Antaeotricha
- Species: A. gubernatrix

Binomial name
- Antaeotricha gubernatrix Meyrick, 1925

Species of moth

Antaeotricha gubernatrix is a species of moth in the family Depressariidae. It was described by Edward Meyrick in 1925. It is found in Peru.

The wingspan is about 18 mm. The forewings are white, the dorsal three-fifths suffused pale brownish, on the posterior third darkened to form a quadrate fuscous blotch, a dark brown streak sprinkled blackish from the base of the costa to the anterior angle of this blotch. There is a very fine black dash representing the plical stigma and a short almost longitudinal fuscous line from beneath the costa at one-sixth. Suffused dark fuscous spots are found just beneath the costal edge before and beyond the middle, where two curved oblique brownish-grey interrupted lines or series of dots run to the dorsum at two-thirds and the tornus, the second acutely indented above the middle. There is also a marginal series of blackish dots around the posterior part of the costa and termen. The hindwings are whitish, the apical third suffused pale greyish and the costa slightly dilated anteriorly, a whitish subcostal hairpencil from the base to three-fifths.
