= Antaeotricha cremastis =

Scientific classification
- Domain: Eukaryota
- Kingdom: Animalia
- Phylum: Arthropoda
- Class: Insecta
- Order: Lepidoptera
- Family: Depressariidae
- Genus: Antaeotricha
- Species: A. cremastis

Binomial name
- Antaeotricha cremastis (Meyrick, 1925)

Synonyms
- Stenoma cremastis Meyrick, 1925

Species of moth

Antaeotricha cremastis is a moth of the family Depressariidae. It is found in Peru and Amazonas, Brazil.

The wingspan is about 24 mm. The forewings are white, the dorsal half mostly suffused with pale ochreous grey, somewhat darker towards the dorsum anteriorly and with three suffused dark grey dorsal blotches, not reaching halfway across the wing, the first subtriangular, before the middle of the wing, the second subquadrate, about three-fourths, the third small, triangular and tornal. There is a small dark grey spot in the disc at one-fourth. The second discal stigma is dark fuscous, with a short oblique fuscous mark above the cell before this and a faint interrupted incurved fuscous line from the costa at four-fifths to the apex of the third dorsal spot. There are also five or six dark fuscous marginal dots around the apex and termen. The hindwings are pale grey, rather darker posteriorly.
