= Antaeotricha pseudochyta =

Scientific classification
- Domain: Eukaryota
- Kingdom: Animalia
- Phylum: Arthropoda
- Class: Insecta
- Order: Lepidoptera
- Family: Depressariidae
- Genus: Antaeotricha
- Species: A. pseudochyta

Binomial name
- Antaeotricha pseudochyta Meyrick, 1915

Species of moth

Antaeotricha pseudochyta is a species of moth of the family Depressariidae. It is found in Guyana and Grenada.

The wingspan is 13–15 mm for males and 16–19 mm for females. The forewings are white with a fuscous blotch composed of two confluent spots occupying the costa from near the base to beyond one-fourth, sending two oblique irregular partially obsolete lines across the wing, in females, the dorsal area is much suffused and blotched with grey, and a blotch of faint grey suffusion is found above the middle of the disc. There is a strong oblique-longitudinal blackish spot on the upper angle of the cell, and a dot beneath its posterior extremity and an irregular curved oblique narrow interrupted fuscous fascia beyond this, slender on the costa in males, more developed in females, the discal spot strongly projecting from its anterior edge. There is some fuscous suffusion towards the apex, in females forming a broader fascia around the apical part of the costa and termen, leaving a toothed white marginal line with interspaces dark fuscous. The hindwings are whitish in males, posteriorly greyish-tinged, in females grey. The costal margin in males is expanded to beyond the middle, with long rough projecting hairscales suffused with grey beneath, and a long pale yellow-ochreous subcostal hairpencil lying beneath the forewings.
