= Antaeotricha himaea =

Scientific classification
- Domain: Eukaryota
- Kingdom: Animalia
- Phylum: Arthropoda
- Class: Insecta
- Order: Lepidoptera
- Family: Depressariidae
- Genus: Antaeotricha
- Species: A. himaea

Binomial name
- Antaeotricha himaea Meyrick, 1916

Species of moth

Antaeotricha himaea is a species of moth of the family Depressariidae. It is found in French Guiana.

The wingspan is about 17 mm. The forewings are ochreous-whitish, the dorsal half from the base to the second line greyish-ochreous mixed with dark grey and with dark fuscous markings. There is a short longitudinal mark from the base of the costa, and an oblique one above the base of the dorsum, as well as an interrupted slightly curved line from beneath one-fifth of the costa to the middle of the dorsum. There is a rather curved line from the middle of the costa to three-fourths of the dorsum, interrupted in the middle but closely followed by a transverse discal dot. A rather curved line is found from two-thirds of the costa to the tornus, the space between this and the preceding rather dark fuscous on the dorsal half limited above by a white streak, the remainder fuscous except the costal edge. The apical area beyond this is obscurely streaked with white suffusion between the veins and there are seven black quadrate marginal dots separated with whitish around the apex and termen. The hindwings are dark grey, in males with a very long whitish-ochreous subcostal hairpencil from the base lying beneath the forewings, reaching five-sixths of the wing.
