= Antaeotricha malachita =

Scientific classification
- Domain: Eukaryota
- Kingdom: Animalia
- Phylum: Arthropoda
- Class: Insecta
- Order: Lepidoptera
- Family: Depressariidae
- Genus: Antaeotricha
- Species: A. malachita

Binomial name
- Antaeotricha malachita Meyrick, 1915

Species of insect

Antaeotricha malachita is a moth in the family Depressariidae. It was described by Edward Meyrick in 1915. It is found in Guyana and Brazil.

The wingspan is about 22 mm. The forewings are dark indigo-blue-grey, the markings suffused bronzy-green, appearing blackish in certain lights. There are irregular curved streaks from the dorsum at the base and one-fourth, meeting in a spot on the costa at one-fourth and three irregular streaks from the dorsum from one-third to three-fourths, meeting in a spot on the middle of the costa. There is a transverse mark on the end of the cell, where some irregular whitish suffusion extends to the dorsum before the tornus. A curved streak is found from two-thirds of the costa to the tornus, edged posteriorly by a suffused whitish line except towards the costa. There is also a terminal streak expanded towards the costa and there are some white scales on termen towards the apex. The hindwings are blackish grey with the costal margin rather expanded from the base to two-thirds, with long rough projecting dark purple-grey hair scales, and a whitish subcostal hair pencil lying beneath the forewings.
