= Antaeotricha doleropis =

Scientific classification
- Kingdom: Animalia
- Phylum: Arthropoda
- Clade: Pancrustacea
- Class: Insecta
- Order: Lepidoptera
- Family: Depressariidae
- Genus: Antaeotricha
- Species: A. doleropis

Binomial name
- Antaeotricha doleropis (Meyrick, 1915)

Synonyms
- Stenoma doleropis Meyrick, 1915

Species of moth

Antaeotricha doleropis is a moth of the family Depressariidae. It is found in Guyana.

The wingspan is about 23 mm. The forewings are grey-whitish, becoming white towards the costa on the anterior half, the costal edge whitish-ochreous. There is a narrow dark fuscous longitudinal streak from the base of the costa to one-third of the disc, somewhat thickened posteriorly and a small dark fuscous spot on the middle of the costa, where an indistinct irregular curved line of grey irroration runs to four-fifths of the dorsum. A dark fuscous dot is found in the disc before this and there is a very faint greyish curved line from three-fourths of the costa to the tornus. A series of dark fuscous dots is found around the posterior part of the costa and termen. The hindwings are grey.
