= Antaeotricha melanopis =

Scientific classification
- Domain: Eukaryota
- Kingdom: Animalia
- Phylum: Arthropoda
- Class: Insecta
- Order: Lepidoptera
- Family: Depressariidae
- Genus: Antaeotricha
- Species: A. melanopis

Binomial name
- Antaeotricha melanopis Meyrick, 1909

Species of moth

Antaeotricha melanopis is a moth in the family Depressariidae. It was described by Edward Meyrick in 1909. It is found in Peru.

The wingspan is about 36 mm. The forewings are white, somewhat mixed irregularly with fuscous and sprinkled finely with blackish. The costal edge is fuscous, with the extreme edge white except towards the base. The dorsal scale-projection is tipped with fuscous and there is a cloudy fuscous spot on the base of the costa, as well as two indistinct fuscous lines represented by small cloudy dark fuscous spots on the costa at one-fifth and the middle, and on the dorsum at the middle and three-fourths respectively, but nearly obsolete in the disc. The second discal stigma is rather large, black and transverse and there is a curved fuscous line from a spot on the costa at two-thirds to the tornus. A suffused rather dark fuscous spot is found on the costa before the apex. The hindwings are fuscous with the costal hairpencil whitish.
