= Antaeotricha exasperata =

Scientific classification
- Kingdom: Animalia
- Phylum: Arthropoda
- Class: Insecta
- Order: Lepidoptera
- Family: Depressariidae
- Genus: Antaeotricha
- Species: A. exasperata

Binomial name
- Antaeotricha exasperata (Meyrick, 1916)

Synonyms
- Stenoma exasperata Meyrick, 1916

Species of moth

Antaeotricha exasperata is a moth of the family Depressariidae. It is found in French Guiana.

The wingspan is 22–23 millimetres (0.87–0.91 in). The forewings are pale greyish-ochreous tinged with pinkish, the disc suffused with pale greenish-grey. The costal edge is ochreous-yellowish from near the base to the middle and a dark ferruginous-fuscous dash from the base above the middle. The discal stigmata are dark ferruginous-fuscous, the second rather large and oblique-transverse. There is a dark ferruginous-fuscous mark on the costa at two-fifths, where a series of irregular ill-defined marks runs to the second discal stigma, and then to the dorsum beyond the middle. A slender ferruginous-fuscous streak is found along the costal sinuation and there is a curved series of cloudy dark ferruginous-fuscous dots from three-fourths of the costa to four-fifths of the dorsum, as well as a marginal series of dark ferruginous-fuscous dots around the apical part of the costa and termen. The hindwings are grey with a deep submedian groove from the base to beyond the middle, clothed internally with black scales and containing a long expansible greyish-ochreous hairpencil.
