= Antaeotricha spurcatella =

Scientific classification
- Kingdom: Animalia
- Phylum: Arthropoda
- Class: Insecta
- Order: Lepidoptera
- Family: Depressariidae
- Genus: Antaeotricha
- Species: A. spurcatella

Binomial name
- Antaeotricha spurcatella (Walker, 1864)

Synonyms
- Cryptolechia spurcatella Walker, 1864; Stenoma chloromis Meyrick, 1915

Species of moth

Antaeotricha spurcatella is a moth of the family Depressariidae. It is found in Guyana and Honduras.

The wingspan is about 25 mm. The forewings are glossy light violet grey with the costa broadly but very indefinitely suffused with ochreous white. The hindwings are grey.
