= Antaeotricha tinactis =

Scientific classification
- Domain: Eukaryota
- Kingdom: Animalia
- Phylum: Arthropoda
- Class: Insecta
- Order: Lepidoptera
- Family: Depressariidae
- Genus: Antaeotricha
- Species: A. tinactis

Binomial name
- Antaeotricha tinactis (Meyrick, 1915)

Synonyms
- Stenoma tinactis Meyrick, 1915

Species of moth

Antaeotricha tinactis is a moth in the family Depressariidae. It was described by Edward Meyrick in 1915. It is found in Guyana.

The wingspan is about 13 mm. The forewings are white, with two rather dark fuscous dorsal blotches, the first extending from the base to one-third, irregularly triangular, reaching two-thirds across the wing, the second oblong, extending from before the middle to the tornus, reaching more than half across the wing, its upper edge with an excavation beneath the blackish second discal stigma. There is an elongate dark fuscous spot above the anterior angle of the second blotch and a short fine black dash beneath the middle of the costa and a curved dark fuscous line from two-thirds of the costa to the tornus, coinciding with the edge of the dorsal blotch. There are two blackish marginal dots above the apex and two on the termen. The hindwings are light grey, the veins darker and the apex suffused with whitish.
