= Antaeotricha extenta =

Scientific classification
- Domain: Eukaryota
- Kingdom: Animalia
- Phylum: Arthropoda
- Class: Insecta
- Order: Lepidoptera
- Family: Depressariidae
- Genus: Antaeotricha
- Species: A. extenta

Binomial name
- Antaeotricha extenta (Busck, 1920)

Synonyms
- Stenoma extenta Busck, 1920; Antaeotricha ptilocrates Meyrick, 1932

Species of moth

Antaeotricha extenta is a moth in the family Depressariidae. It was described by August Busck in 1920. It is found in Guatemala and Panama.
