= Antaeotricha laxa =

Scientific classification
- Domain: Eukaryota
- Kingdom: Animalia
- Phylum: Arthropoda
- Class: Insecta
- Order: Lepidoptera
- Family: Depressariidae
- Genus: Antaeotricha
- Species: A. laxa

Binomial name
- Antaeotricha laxa (Meyrick, 1915)

Synonyms
- Stenoma laxa Meyrick, 1915

Species of moth

Antaeotricha laxa is a moth of the family Depressariidae. It is found in Venezuela.

The wingspan is about 17 mm. The forewings are white with the dorsal area beneath the fold tinged with pale fuscous and with an irregular dark fuscous blotch on the middle of the dorsum, reaching one-third across the wing, and a smaller inwardly oblique triangular one towards the tornus. A rather dark fuscous dot is found in the disc before one-third, one between this and the first blotch, one in the disc beyond the middle, and one between this and the second blotch. There is a series of brownish dots from beneath the costa at four-fifths to the tornus, the one opposite the apex considerably displaced anteriorly. Six marginal dark fuscous dots are found on the termen. The hindwings are grey-whitish, with the terminal edge grey.
