= Antaeotricha ophrysta =

Scientific classification
- Kingdom: Animalia
- Phylum: Arthropoda
- Class: Insecta
- Order: Lepidoptera
- Family: Depressariidae
- Genus: Antaeotricha
- Species: A. ophrysta

Binomial name
- Antaeotricha ophrysta Meyrick, 1912

Species of moth

Antaeotricha ophrysta is a moth of the family Depressariidae. It is found in Suriname.

The wingspan is about 25 mm. The forewings are white with a suffused grey streak along the basal third of the costa and a very faint transverse dorsal patch of pale grey suffusion before the middle, as well as a spot of pale grey suffusion on the dorsum beyond the middle and a moderately broad curved light grey fascia from beneath the middle of the costa to the tornus. The second discal stigma is blackish, closely preceding this and there is a series of four grey spots confluent on the margin traversing the apex. The hindwings are white, the apical half light grey and with an expansible fringe of long ochreous-whitish hairs extending along vein 8 from the base to two-thirds of the wing, the vein strongly sinuate beyond this. The costa with long projecting rough grey and whitish scales from the base to three-fourths.
