= Antaeotricha nerteropa =

Scientific classification
- Domain: Eukaryota
- Kingdom: Animalia
- Phylum: Arthropoda
- Class: Insecta
- Order: Lepidoptera
- Family: Depressariidae
- Genus: Antaeotricha
- Species: A. nerteropa

Binomial name
- Antaeotricha nerteropa Meyrick, 1915

Species of moth

Antaeotricha nerteropa is a moth in the family Depressariidae. It was described by Edward Meyrick in 1915. It is found in Peru.

The wingspan is about 18 mm. The forewings are white tinged with ochreous in the disc and with a dark leaden-fuscous blotch extending over the basal fourth of the dorsum and an irregular fuscous line from one-fourth of the costa to the middle of the dorsum, and fuscous marks on the costa and dorsum before this. A transverse-oval black spot is found on the lower angle of the cell and there is a rather oblique somewhat curved grey fascia beyond this, narrowed on the costa and interrupted beneath the costa, irregularly dilated on the dorsum beneath the discal spot. There is a grey fascia on the termen from the apex to the tornus, narrowed downwards and a marginal row of blackish dots around the apical part of the costa and termen, separated with white. The hindwings are pale grey, darker posteriorly, the apex narrowly whitish and the costal margin expanded to beyond the middle, with long rough projecting hairscales suffused with grey beneath, and a long grey subcostal hairpencil lying beneath the forewings.
