= Antaeotricha polyglypta =

Scientific classification
- Domain: Eukaryota
- Kingdom: Animalia
- Phylum: Arthropoda
- Class: Insecta
- Order: Lepidoptera
- Family: Depressariidae
- Genus: Antaeotricha
- Species: A. polyglypta

Binomial name
- Antaeotricha polyglypta (Meyrick, 1915)

Synonyms
- Stenoma polyglypta Meyrick, 1915

Species of moth

Antaeotricha polyglypta is a moth of the family Depressariidae. It is found in Guyana and French Guiana.

The wingspan is 18–20 mm. The forewings are pale yellow-ochreous with an elongate blackish blotch from the base beneath the costa to two-fifths of the disc, attenuated anteriorly, including a suffused line of ground colour on the upper margin of the cell and thick irregular blackish submedian and subdorsal streaks from the base to beyond the middle of the wing. Two blackish blotches are transversely placed in the disc beyond the middle, the upper elongate, sometimes connected with the upper angle of the anterior blotch, the lower trapezoidal, connected by a streak with a lower angle of anterior blotch. There is a dark grey subcostal streak throughout, posteriorly terminating in a cloudy dark grey rather curved subterminal and terminal fasciae, more or less cut by pale lines on the veins, leaving a terminal edge of ground colour. The hindwings are dark grey.
