= Antaeotricha aggravata =

Scientific classification
- Kingdom: Animalia
- Phylum: Arthropoda
- Clade: Pancrustacea
- Class: Insecta
- Order: Lepidoptera
- Family: Depressariidae
- Genus: Antaeotricha
- Species: A. aggravata

Binomial name
- Antaeotricha aggravata (Meyrick, 1916)

Synonyms
- Stenoma aggravata Meyrick, 1916

Species of moth in genus Antaeotricha

Antaeotricha aggravata is a moth of the family Depressariidae. It is found in French Guiana.

The wingspan is about 16 mm. The forewings are rather dark grey with the costal edge suffusedly white except towards the base and with three cloudy darker lines, blackish towards the costa, the first from one-fourth of the costa to the middle of the dorsum, the second from the middle of the costa to four-fifths of the dorsum, somewhat bent in the middle, the third from three-fourths of the costa to the tornus, curved. The apical area beyond this is suffused with white and with eight blackish marginal dots around the apex and termen. The hindwings are dark grey.
