= Antaeotricha haplocentra =

Scientific classification
- Domain: Eukaryota
- Kingdom: Animalia
- Phylum: Arthropoda
- Class: Insecta
- Order: Lepidoptera
- Family: Depressariidae
- Genus: Antaeotricha
- Species: A. haplocentra

Binomial name
- Antaeotricha haplocentra Meyrick, 1925

Species of moth

Antaeotricha haplocentra is a moth in the family Depressariidae. It was described by Edward Meyrick in 1925. It is found in Brazil.

The wingspan is 16–17 mm. The forewings are greyish-ochreous or fuscous with the costal edge whitish-ochreous, continued around the termen as a waved line. The plical and second discal stigmata are dark fuscous, the plical linear. The hindwings are grey-whitish, with the posterior half suffused light grey and the costa in males expanded on the basal half, with a strong projecting fringe of greyish-ochreous or grey hairscales, and a whitish subcostal hairpencil from the base to beyond the middle.
