= Antaeotricha sardania =

Scientific classification
- Domain: Eukaryota
- Kingdom: Animalia
- Phylum: Arthropoda
- Class: Insecta
- Order: Lepidoptera
- Family: Depressariidae
- Genus: Antaeotricha
- Species: A. sardania

Binomial name
- Antaeotricha sardania Meyrick, 1925

Species of moth

Antaeotricha sardania is a moth in the family Depressariidae. It was described by Edward Meyrick in 1925. It is found in Brazil (Para) and Peru.

The wingspan is 14–15 mm. The forewings have an irregular grey longitudinal suffusion extending from the base through the disc and gradually expanding to three-fourths, sometimes extending nearly to the costa, with variable transverse bars, spots, or clouds of dark fuscous suffusion, beyond the middle connected with the dorsum by a more or less developed patch of similar mottling, and with an oblique streak from near the posterior extremity to the costa beyond the middle. There is a dark ferruginous fascia narrowed downwards around the apex and upper two-thirds of the termen, edged anteriorly by a sinuate white line and then by a streak of grey suffusion. The hindwings are grey with the costa rather dilated on the anterior two-thirds, with a fringe of white projecting scales and a stronger white median tuft, as well as an ochreous-whitish expansible hairpencil lying in a yellowish subcostal groove from the base to two-thirds.
