= Antaeotricha celidotis =

Scientific classification
- Domain: Eukaryota
- Kingdom: Animalia
- Phylum: Arthropoda
- Class: Insecta
- Order: Lepidoptera
- Family: Depressariidae
- Genus: Antaeotricha
- Species: A. celidotis

Binomial name
- Antaeotricha celidotis Meyrick, 1925

Species of moth

Antaeotricha celidotis is a moth in the family Depressariidae. It was described by Edward Meyrick in 1925. It is found in Peru.

The wingspan is 18–19 mm. The forewings are ochreous-whitish with a blackish spot on the costa at one-fourth, extended on the costa anteriorly by grey suffusion. The dorsal half is suffused light ochreous-grey, on the tornus forming a rounded blotch extending three-fourths across the wing but not reaching the termen except towards the tornus. There is a light greyish dot resting on this at one-thirds, indicating the first discal stigma. The dorsal edge is ferruginous towards one-third, with a dot of dark grey irroration and there is a grey dorsal dot at two-thirds, as well as a series of four or five undefined greyish spots from beneath the costa beyond the middle to the dorsum before the tornus. A dark grey dash is found on the costa about three-fourths, and three or four partly confluent triangular marginal marks are found around the apex. The hindwings are light grey, tinged ochreous-whitish towards the base, the apical edge whitish and the costa expanded on the basal half, with a strong broad projection of dense grey scales from near the base to the middle, as well as a pale yellowish subcostal hairpencil from the base reaching to beyond the middle.
