= Antaeotricha dromica =

Scientific classification
- Domain: Eukaryota
- Kingdom: Animalia
- Phylum: Arthropoda
- Class: Insecta
- Order: Lepidoptera
- Family: Depressariidae
- Genus: Antaeotricha
- Species: A. dromica

Binomial name
- Antaeotricha dromica (Meyrick, 1925)

Synonyms
- Stenoma dromica Meyrick, 1925

Species of moth

Antaeotricha dromica is a species of moth of the family Depressariidae. It is found in Brazil (Para).

The wingspan is 14–15 mm for males and about 16 mm for females. The forewings are ochreous-white irregularly mixed grey, the dorsal half more or less irregularly suffused grey, in males with a subcostal groove from the base to near the middle enclosing an expansible pencil of whitish hairs. There is a grey streak from the base of the costa above the fold, and a blackish line along the fold from the base to the linear blackish plical stigma. A very oblique dark grey streak is found from beneath the costa at one-fifth to the elongate dark grey first discal stigma, nearly above the plical. The second discal stigma is cloudy, dark fuscous, placed in some elongate fuscous suffusion, a very oblique dark fuscous line from the middle of the costa to just above this. There is a semi-oval blotch of dark grey suffusion before the middle of the dorsum, and a triangular blotch towards the tornus, as well as a rather strongly curved dark fuscous line, thickened towards the extremities, from the costa at three-fourths to the dorsal end of the latter. About eight black marginal dots are found around the costa and termen, those on each side of the apex largest. The hindwings are grey.
