= Antaeotricha cnemosaris =

Scientific classification
- Kingdom: Animalia
- Phylum: Arthropoda
- Clade: Pancrustacea
- Class: Insecta
- Order: Lepidoptera
- Family: Depressariidae
- Genus: Antaeotricha
- Species: A. cnemosaris

Binomial name
- Antaeotricha cnemosaris (Meyrick, 1925)

Synonyms
- Stenoma cnemosaris Meyrick, 1925

Species of moth

Antaeotricha cnemosaris is a moth of the family Depressariidae. It is found in Brazil (Para).

The wingspan is 18–19 mm. The forewings are pale greyish-ochreous, the dorsal two-thirds more or less vaguely infuscated to the end of the cell or beyond, the veins posteriorly more or less infuscated, the extreme costal edge is tinged whitish. The stigmata are small, cloudy and dark fuscous, the plical obliquely beyond the first discal, sometimes little marked, two or three small cloudy fuscous dots in an oblique series between the middle of the costa and the second discal. There is an indistinct curved fuscous line from three-fourths of the costa to the dorsum before the tornus and a marginal series of blackish dots around the posterior part of the costa and the termen. The hindwings are grey-whitish.
