= Antaeotricha enodata =

Scientific classification
- Domain: Eukaryota
- Kingdom: Animalia
- Phylum: Arthropoda
- Class: Insecta
- Order: Lepidoptera
- Family: Depressariidae
- Genus: Antaeotricha
- Species: A. enodata

Binomial name
- Antaeotricha enodata Meyrick, 1916

Species of moth

Antaeotricha enodata is a species of moth of the family Depressariidae. It is found in French Guiana.

The wingspan is 24–27 mm. The forewings are grey with a basal patch of fuscous suffusion, browner towards the dorsum, the edge running from one-fourth of the costa to one-third of the dorsum, rather irregular. There is a suffused white patch occupying more or less the width of the costal area from this to beyond the middle and a very irregular rather curved whitish streak from three-fifths of the costa to four-fifths of the dorsum, sometimes partially confluent in the disc with the preceding. A small cloudy dark fuscous spot is found on the dorsum beyond the middle and there is a slightly curved cloudy white line from four-fifths of the costa to the tornus, somewhat indented near the costa. There is also a cloudy white line along the termen. The hindwings are rather dark grey, with the costa rather expanded from the base to two-thirds, with a strong broad projection of rough scales before the middle suffused with grey beneath, and a long whitish subcostal hairpencil from the base lying beneath the forewings.
