= Antaeotricha manceps =

Scientific classification
- Kingdom: Animalia
- Phylum: Arthropoda
- Clade: Pancrustacea
- Class: Insecta
- Order: Lepidoptera
- Family: Depressariidae
- Genus: Antaeotricha
- Species: A. manceps

Binomial name
- Antaeotricha manceps Meyrick, 1925

Species of moth

Antaeotricha manceps is a moth in the family Depressariidae. It was described by Edward Meyrick in 1925. It is found in Peru.

The wingspan is about 13 mm. The forewings are white with a dark fuscous supramedian line from the base to near one-third. There is a dot on the fold near the base and there are three fuscous dorsal blotches not reaching half across the wing, the first basal and cloudy, the second median, oblong, the third pre-tornal and rhomboidal. A fuscous dash is found in the disc above the second blotch, and some irroration beneath it anteriorly. There is a dark fuscous partially indistinct line from the costa at two-fifths to the second discal stigma, where a line of irroration runs in the disc to the following line. There is a slightly curved dark fuscous line from the costa before three-fourths, thickened towards the costa, to the posterior angle of the third blotch. There is also a large blackish apical dot and two smaller ones above it. The hindwings are light grey with the costa slightly dilated anteriorly, a whitish subcostal hairpencil from the base to the middle.
