= Antaeotricha plumosa =

Scientific classification
- Kingdom: Animalia
- Phylum: Arthropoda
- Clade: Pancrustacea
- Class: Insecta
- Order: Lepidoptera
- Family: Depressariidae
- Genus: Antaeotricha
- Species: A. plumosa

Binomial name
- Antaeotricha plumosa (Busck, 1914)

Synonyms
- Stenoma plumosa Busck, 1914

Species of moth

Antaeotricha plumosa is a moth in the family Depressariidae. It was described by August Busck in 1914. It is found in Panama.

The wingspan is about 15 mm (0.59 in). The forewings are yellowish brown with a violet sheen and a dark brown line from the base along the base of the dorsum, another similarly colored, zigzag line obliquely across the cell to the middle of the dorsum. There is a dark brown, nearly straight line from the middle of the costa at the tornus and an outwardly curved, dark brown line from the apical fourth to the tornus. A marginal series of black dots is found around the apex. The hindwings are light yellow fuscous, in the male with a light yellow costal hair pencil.
