= Antaeotricha segmentata =

Scientific classification
- Domain: Eukaryota
- Kingdom: Animalia
- Phylum: Arthropoda
- Class: Insecta
- Order: Lepidoptera
- Family: Depressariidae
- Genus: Antaeotricha
- Species: A. segmentata

Binomial name
- Antaeotricha segmentata (Meyrick, 1915)

Synonyms
- Stenoma segmentata Meyrick, 1915

Species of moth

Antaeotricha segmentata is a species of moth of the family Depressariidae. It is found in Guyana.

The wingspan is about 18 mm. The forewings are white with the costal edge dark fuscous towards the base and with a rather short dark fuscous longitudinal streak from the base of the costa, as well as a very oblique one from one-fourth of the costa, a longitudinal one in the disc about one-third, and a rather longer slightly sinuate very oblique one in the disc beyond the middle. A similar longitudinal streak is found beneath the fold towards the base, connected anteriorly with a narrow elongate dark fuscous blotch along the basal third of the dorsum. There is an irregular dark fuscous blotch on the middle of the dorsum, with an angular projection anteriorly. A trapezoidal dark fuscous blotch is found on the tornus, broadest above, and an irregular dark fuscous line from two-thirds of the costa running into its posterior angle. There is also a series of small dark fuscous marginal spots around the apex and termen. The hindwings grey, basally suffused with grey-whitish.
