= Antaeotricha nictitans =

Scientific classification
- Kingdom: Animalia
- Phylum: Arthropoda
- Clade: Pancrustacea
- Class: Insecta
- Order: Lepidoptera
- Family: Depressariidae
- Genus: Antaeotricha
- Species: A. nictitans

Binomial name
- Antaeotricha nictitans (Zeller, 1854)

Synonyms
- Mesoptycha nictitans Zeller, 1854; Stenoma heteropa Meyrick, 1913

Species of moth

Antaeotricha nictitans is a moth in the family Depressariidae. It was described by Philipp Christoph Zeller in 1854. It is found in Guyana, Suriname, French Guiana and Paraguay.

The wingspan is 27–30 mm. The forewings are greyish-ochreous, with the base, costa towards the middle, and a curved transverse fascia from four-fifths of the costa to the tornus obscurely suffused with whitish. the first discal stigma is represented by a dark grey or blackish-grey cloudy spot, the second by an obscure whitish dot. The hindwings are grey.
