= Antaeotricha coniopa =

Scientific classification
- Domain: Eukaryota
- Kingdom: Animalia
- Phylum: Arthropoda
- Class: Insecta
- Order: Lepidoptera
- Family: Depressariidae
- Genus: Antaeotricha
- Species: A. coniopa

Binomial name
- Antaeotricha coniopa (Meyrick, 1925)

Synonyms
- Stenoma coniopa Meyrick, 1925

Species of moth

Antaeotricha coniopa is a moth of the family Depressariidae. It is found in Brazil (Para).

The wingspan is 11–12 mm. The forewings are whitish, slightly tinged or speckled fuscous, with a dark fuscous dash above the middle near the base and some fuscous suffusion along the basal third of the dorsum and three rather irregular oblique dark fuscous lines, the first curved, from one-fourth of the costa to the middle of the dorsum, gradually thickened downwards and tending to form spots in the disc, on the dorsal third broadly expanded posteriorly with fuscous suffusion, the second from the middle of the costa to four-fifths of the dorsum, interrupted on each side of the moderate second discal stigma, the third nearly straight, from three-fourths of the costa to the termen above the tornus, towards the costa strong and preceded by some fuscous suffusion, the tornal area between these lines suffused fuscous. There are five blackish marginal dots around the apical area. The hindwings are pale grey.
