= Antaeotricha costatella =

Scientific classification
- Kingdom: Animalia
- Phylum: Arthropoda
- Class: Insecta
- Order: Lepidoptera
- Family: Depressariidae
- Genus: Antaeotricha
- Species: A. costatella

Binomial name
- Antaeotricha costatella (Walker, 1864)

Synonyms
- Cryptolechia costatella Walker, 1864

Species of moth

Antaeotricha costatella is a moth in the family Depressariidae. It was described by Francis Walker in 1864. It is found in Amazonas, Brazil.

Adults are silvery white, the forewings with a brown stripe, which rests on the interior border and becomes slightly and abruptly broader at a little before half the length of the wing, and extends very nearly to the exterior border. A few slender brown streaks form an interrupted line between the stripe and the costa. The marginal points are black and minute. The hindwings of the males are cinereous while those of the females are brown.
