= Antaeotricha orthotona =

Scientific classification
- Domain: Eukaryota
- Kingdom: Animalia
- Phylum: Arthropoda
- Class: Insecta
- Order: Lepidoptera
- Family: Depressariidae
- Genus: Antaeotricha
- Species: A. orthotona

Binomial name
- Antaeotricha orthotona Meyrick, 1916

Species of moth

Antaeotricha orthotona is a moth of the family Depressariidae. It is found in French Guiana.

The wingspan is 19–21 mm. The forewings are white with dark fuscous markings and with a broad streak from the base of the costa, where it occupies nearly one-fourth, extending above the middle to beyond the cell. The dorsal area below the fold is suffused with pale greyish and there are four small dark spots on the upper margin of the fold, and several others below the fold and on the dorsum. There are two dots transversely placed on the end of the cell, as well as a curved line from three-fifths of the costa to the tornus, well-defined posteriorly, sometimes rather broadly suffused anteriorly. There is a suffused spot on the costa towards the apex, and an indistinct waved suffused line before the termen. The hindwings are grey, lighter towards the base.
