= Antaeotricha rostriformis =

Scientific classification
- Domain: Eukaryota
- Kingdom: Animalia
- Phylum: Arthropoda
- Class: Insecta
- Order: Lepidoptera
- Family: Depressariidae
- Genus: Antaeotricha
- Species: A. rostriformis

Binomial name
- Antaeotricha rostriformis (Meyrick, 1916)

Synonyms
- Stenoma rostriformis Meyrick, 1916

Species of moth

Antaeotricha rostriformis is a moth of the family Depressariidae. It is found in French Guiana.

The wingspan is 18–19 mm. The forewings are pale whitish-violet, tinged with greenish and with the costal edge yellowish-ferruginous except in the middle. The costal half of the wing is irregularly streaked with dark fuscous from the base to beyond the middle, the cell mostly suffused with brown except posteriorly. The second discal stigma is dark fuscous and transverse and the veins beyond the cell are streaked with fuscous or brown. There is some fuscous or dark fuscous suffusion towards the dorsum beyond the middle and a dentate brown or dark fuscous line from the costa beyond the scale-projection to near the termen beneath the apex, then curved to the dorsum before the tornus, where it forms a small suffused spot. A marginal series of dark fuscous marks is found around the posterior portion of the costa and termen. The hindwings are dark grey.
