= Antaeotricha triplectra =

Scientific classification
- Domain: Eukaryota
- Kingdom: Animalia
- Phylum: Arthropoda
- Class: Insecta
- Order: Lepidoptera
- Family: Depressariidae
- Genus: Antaeotricha
- Species: A. triplectra

Binomial name
- Antaeotricha triplectra (Meyrick, 1915)

Synonyms
- Stenoma triplectra Meyrick, 1915

Species of moth

Antaeotricha triplectra is a moth of the family Depressariidae. It is found in Guyana.

The wingspan is 14–17 mm. The forewings are dark grey with very oblique black linear marks on the costa at one-fourth, the middle, and three-fourths, the costal edge between and beyond these suffused with ochreous-white. The second discal stigma is indistinct and dark fuscous, edged with ochreous-white posteriorly. From the third costal mark, a somewhat irregular dark fuscous line runs to the tornus, moderately curved on the lower half, the area beyond this more or less suffused with ochreous-white. There are about eight blackish marginal dots around the apex and termen. The hindwings are dark grey.
