= Antaeotricha balanocentra =

Scientific classification
- Kingdom: Animalia
- Phylum: Arthropoda
- Clade: Pancrustacea
- Class: Insecta
- Order: Lepidoptera
- Family: Depressariidae
- Genus: Antaeotricha
- Species: A. balanocentra

Binomial name
- Antaeotricha balanocentra (Meyrick, 1915)

Synonyms
- Aphanoxena balanocentra Meyrick, 1915

Species of moth in genus Antaeotricha

Antaeotricha balanocentra is a species of moth of the family Depressariidae. It is found in Guyana.

The wingspan is 16–19 mm. The forewings are in white in males and ochreous-whitish in females. There is a faint grey oblique interrupted line near the base and a small dark grey spot on the costa at one-fourth, where a very irregular oblique interrupted faint grey line crosses the wing. An oval black spot is found on the upper angle of the cell, with a dot beneath its posterior extremity. A fascia composed of two dark fuscous streaks suffused together with fuscous is found from the costa beyond the middle to the dorsum before the tornus, curved outwards around the discal spot and the posterior edge obtusely angulated above the middle, widest and darkest towards the dorsum. There is a fuscous terminal band mixed with white, only separated from the preceding on the lower three-fourths by a white line, edged on the termen by a white toothed line with the interspaces filled with dark fuscous. The hindwings in males are ochreous-whitish, in females light greyish. There is a small irregular dark fuscous spot on the costa before the apex and the costal margin in males is expanded from the base to three-fourths, with long rough projecting hairscales towards the middle, suffused with grey beneath, and a long ochreous-whitish subcostal hairpencil lying beneath the forewings.
