= Antaeotricha phaeoneura =

Scientific classification
- Kingdom: Animalia
- Phylum: Arthropoda
- Class: Insecta
- Order: Lepidoptera
- Family: Depressariidae
- Genus: Antaeotricha
- Species: A. phaeoneura

Binomial name
- Antaeotricha phaeoneura (Meyrick, 1913)

Synonyms
- Stenoma phaeoneura Meyrick, 1913

Species of moth

Antaeotricha phaeoneura is a moth in the family Depressariidae. It was described by Edward Meyrick in 1913. It is found in Guyana.

The wingspan is about 29 mm. The forewings are ochreous-white and with all veins marked with fuscous lines. The submedian space is tinged with pale greyish-ochreous, the dorsal space suffused with ochreous-grey. The hindwings are pale grey.
