= Antaeotricha ovulifera =

Scientific classification
- Kingdom: Animalia
- Phylum: Arthropoda
- Clade: Pancrustacea
- Class: Insecta
- Order: Lepidoptera
- Family: Depressariidae
- Genus: Antaeotricha
- Species: A. ovulifera

Binomial name
- Antaeotricha ovulifera (Meyrick, 1925)

Synonyms
- Stenoma ovulifera Meyrick, 1925

Species of moth

Antaeotricha ovulifera is a species of moth of the family Depressariidae. It is found in Peru.

The wingspan is about 12 mm. The forewings are dark grey with the extreme costal edge whitish from about one-fourth to three-fourths. The first discal stigma and obliquely posterior plical are faintly darker and there is a small suffused white elongate spot on the fold towards the extremity. There is a slightly curved dark fuscous shade from beyond the middle of the costa to the dorsum before the tornus, preceded by some whitish scales in the disc and a suffused white mark on the costa, as well as a dark fuscous shade from the costa at four-fifths to the middle of the termen. Three minute whitish dots are found around the apex. The hindwings are blackish-grey.
