= Antaeotricha discalis =

Scientific classification
- Domain: Eukaryota
- Kingdom: Animalia
- Phylum: Arthropoda
- Class: Insecta
- Order: Lepidoptera
- Family: Depressariidae
- Genus: Antaeotricha
- Species: A. discalis

Binomial name
- Antaeotricha discalis (Busck, 1914)

Synonyms
- Stenoma discalis Busck, 1914

Species of moth

Antaeotricha discalis is a moth in the family Depressariidae. It was described by August Busck in 1914. It is found in Panama.

The wingspan is about 20 mm. The forewings are yellowish white with the dorsal half suffused with light grey and a small, blackish costal spot at the basal fourth. There is another at the apical fourth, and one at the apex, as well as a small dark brown spot at the basal fourth of the dorsum. The hindwings are light fuscous.
