= Antaeotricha leucocryptis =

Scientific classification
- Domain: Eukaryota
- Kingdom: Animalia
- Phylum: Arthropoda
- Class: Insecta
- Order: Lepidoptera
- Family: Depressariidae
- Genus: Antaeotricha
- Species: A. leucocryptis

Binomial name
- Antaeotricha leucocryptis (Meyrick, 1932)

Synonyms
- Stenoma leucocryptis Meyrick, 1932

Species of moth

Antaeotricha leucocryptis is a moth in the family Depressariidae. It was described by Edward Meyrick in 1932. It is found in Colombia.

The wingspan is about 28 mm. The hindwings are blackish fuscous.
