= Antaeotricha lampyridella =

Scientific classification
- Domain: Eukaryota
- Kingdom: Animalia
- Phylum: Arthropoda
- Class: Insecta
- Order: Lepidoptera
- Family: Depressariidae
- Genus: Antaeotricha
- Species: A. lampyridella

Binomial name
- Antaeotricha lampyridella (Busck, 1914)

Synonyms
- Stenoma lampyridella Busck, 1914

Species of moth

Antaeotricha lampyridella is a moth in the family Depressariidae. It was described by August Busck in 1914. It is found in Panama.

The wingspan is about 22 mm. The forewings are dark mouse grey with a yellowish tint and with the costal edge and a longitudinal streak from the base to the apex through the middle of the wing ochreous. The extreme base of the costa is black, below which the base of the wing is conspicuously reddish brown. The base of the fold is ochreous. The hindwings are blackish fuscous.
