= Antaeotricha griseanomina =

Scientific classification
- Domain: Eukaryota
- Kingdom: Animalia
- Phylum: Arthropoda
- Class: Insecta
- Order: Lepidoptera
- Family: Depressariidae
- Genus: Antaeotricha
- Species: A. griseanomina

Binomial name
- Antaeotricha griseanomina Busck, 1934

Synonyms
- Phalaena (Tortrix) griseana Sepp, [1850] (preocc. Fabricius, 1794)

Species of moth

Antaeotricha griseanomina is a moth in the family Depressariidae. It was described by August Busck in 1934. It is found in the Guianas.
