= Antaeotricha stigmatias =

Scientific classification
- Domain: Eukaryota
- Kingdom: Animalia
- Phylum: Arthropoda
- Class: Insecta
- Order: Lepidoptera
- Family: Depressariidae
- Genus: Antaeotricha
- Species: A. stigmatias

Binomial name
- Antaeotricha stigmatias (Walsingham, 1913)

Synonyms
- Stenoma stigmatias Walsingham, 1913

Species of moth

Antaeotricha stigmatias is a moth in the family Depressariidae. It was described by Lord Walsingham in 1913. It is found in Guatemala.

The wingspan is about 23 mm. The forewings are pale fawn-ochreous, becoming whitish ochreous along the basal half of the costa, with six irregular, scarcely disconnected, elongate, fuscous blotches in two slightly curved parallel series. The upper one of the first series running to the base, the lower one lying below the outer half of the fold, with a slight shade below it nearer to the dorsum. The two outer blotches of the second series extend to about two-thirds from the base, the upper and inner one not reaching the costa. Beyond these a small, broken, fuscous costal patch is confluent with some costal spots of the same colour, forming the upper end of an apical and terminal series of nine or ten extending to the tornus. The hindwings are brownish grey.
