= Antaeotricha ostodes =

Scientific classification
- Domain: Eukaryota
- Kingdom: Animalia
- Phylum: Arthropoda
- Class: Insecta
- Order: Lepidoptera
- Family: Depressariidae
- Genus: Antaeotricha
- Species: A. ostodes

Binomial name
- Antaeotricha ostodes (Walsingham, 1913)

Synonyms
- Stenoma ostodes Walsingham, 1913

Species of moth

Antaeotricha ostodes is a moth in the family Depressariidae. It was described by Lord Walsingham in 1913. It is found in Guatemala.

The wingspan is 19–20 mm. The forewings are bone-white with a very faint suffusion of bone-grey on the dorsal half and in a semicircular shade arising from the tornus. A greyish fuscous spot, at the extreme base of the costa, is followed by another costal spot at one-fifth, and before the apex are two faint, elongate, greyish fuscous costal shades. A small very faint reduplicated spot, on the disc at one-fourth, is followed by a similar double dot at the end of the cell, beneath which is a small inwardly oblique greyish fuscous dorsal streak. The hindwings are pale bone-grey, the costa much elevated at the base, with a broad fringe of spatulate scales, greyish fuscous on their underside, also a long pencil of pale bone-ochreous hair-scales from near the base of the costa on the upperside.
