= Antaeotricha cycnolopha =

Scientific classification
- Domain: Eukaryota
- Kingdom: Animalia
- Phylum: Arthropoda
- Class: Insecta
- Order: Lepidoptera
- Family: Depressariidae
- Genus: Antaeotricha
- Species: A. cycnolopha

Binomial name
- Antaeotricha cycnolopha (Meyrick, 1925)

Synonyms
- Stenoma cycnolopha Meyrick, 1925

Species of moth

Antaeotricha cycnolopha is a species of moth of the family Depressariidae. It is found in Peru.

The wingspan is about 17 mm. The forewings are white, the dorsal half irregularly suffused grey, from beneath the basal two-fifths of the costa a dense downwards-directed fringe of white hairscales is found, ochreous-tinged towards the tips. There is a short longitudinal dark fuscous streak from the base of the costa beneath this and a dark fuscous line along the fold from near the base to one-third. A dark fuscous line is found from beneath the costal fringe at one-third to the second discal stigma and there is a suffused dark grey rounded blotch on the middle of the dorsum. The second discal stigma is moderate, dark fuscous, and traversed by a slightly curved dark fuscous line from the costa before the middle to a suffused dark grey subtriangular pre-tornal blotch. There is an oblique dark fuscous line from the costa at three-fourths, curved round beneath to the tornus and suffused with the same blotch. Six blackish dots are found around the apex and termen, the largest at the apex. The hindwings are light grey.
