= Antaeotricha irenias =

Scientific classification
- Domain: Eukaryota
- Kingdom: Animalia
- Phylum: Arthropoda
- Class: Insecta
- Order: Lepidoptera
- Family: Depressariidae
- Genus: Antaeotricha
- Species: A. irenias

Binomial name
- Antaeotricha irenias (Meyrick, 1916)

Synonyms
- Stenoma irenias Meyrick, 1916

Species of moth

Antaeotricha irenias is a moth of the family Depressariidae. It is found in French Guiana.

The wingspan is about 16 mm. The forewings are pale brownish-ochreous with the costal third whitish-grey, extended down the termen to the middle, edged with white suffusion beneath towards the base, crossed by oblique darker shades at one-third and beyond the middle. There is an irregular fuscous line from two-thirds of the costa to three-fourths of the dorsum, with an angular dentation outwards below the middle, limiting a transverse light yellowish-brown blotch reaching from the tornus more than half across the wing, edged above and more strongly posteriorly with white suffusion. The hindwings are ochreous-white with a very slender fuscous hairpencil lying in a submedian groove from the base.
