= Antaeotricha camarina =

Scientific classification
- Kingdom: Animalia
- Phylum: Arthropoda
- Clade: Pancrustacea
- Class: Insecta
- Order: Lepidoptera
- Family: Depressariidae
- Genus: Antaeotricha
- Species: A. camarina

Binomial name
- Antaeotricha camarina Meyrick, 1915

Species of moth in genus Antaeotricha

Antaeotricha camarina is a moth in the family Depressariidae. It was described by Edward Meyrick in 1915. It is found in Guyana.

The wingspan is about 17 mm. The forewings are white with a short dark fuscous mark along the base of the dorsum and a thick irregular dark fuscous streak from the base of the costa to before the middle of the dorsum. The costal edge is dark fuscous to one-fourth, whence an irregular dark fuscous line runs to the dorsum beyond the middle, tending to be suffused with the preceding streak on the dorsal half. A slender dark fuscous streak is found from the middle of the costa to the dorsum before the tornus, dilated towards the dorsum. There is a faintly sinuate dark fuscous line from three-fourths of the costa to the tornus and there are some scattered fuscous scales in the disc and towards the apex. Six rather large blackish marginal dots are found around the apex and termen. The hindwings are grey, the apex tinged with whitish and the costal margin rather expanded from the base to three-fourths, with a long ochreous-whitish subcostal hairpencil lying beneath the forewings.
