= Antaeotricha iras =

Scientific classification
- Kingdom: Animalia
- Phylum: Arthropoda
- Class: Insecta
- Order: Lepidoptera
- Family: Depressariidae
- Genus: Antaeotricha
- Species: A. iras

Binomial name
- Antaeotricha iras Meyrick, 1926

Species of moth

Antaeotricha iras is a species of moth of the family Depressariidae. It is found in Peru. The holotype was collected at an altitude of 3,700 m (12,000 ft).

== Description ==
The wingspan is about 18 mm. The forewings are white, faintly ochreous tinged in the disc and with the costal edge dark grey on the basal fourth. There is an irregular oblique grey streak broken into spots from beneath the costa near the base, another from the costa at one-fourth to before the middle of the dorsum, and one or two marks towards the dorsum between these. The second discal stigma is large, oval and blackish, with a minute dot beneath it. There is a slightly curved fuscous fascia from two-thirds of the costa to the dorsum before the tornus, constricted near the costa, and including a whitish shade from beneath the costa to below the middle. A toothed white marginal line is found around the apex and termen with five blackish dots in the indentations around the apex, narrow fuscous irroration preceding this. The hindwings are whitish tinged greyish-ochreous posteriorly, the costa dilated on the anterior half, with a broad projecting costal fringe before the middle of the fuscous hairscales tipped white. There is also a whitish-ochreous subcostal hairpencil from the base to beyond the middle.
