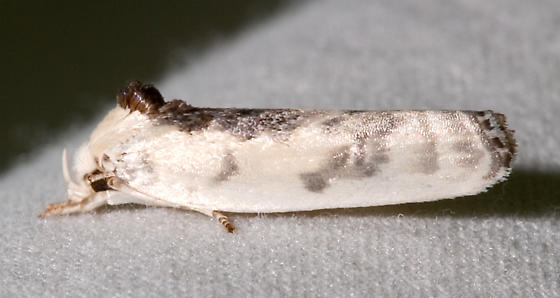
- Antaeotricha sp.

Scientific classification
- Kingdom: Animalia
- Phylum: Arthropoda
- Class: Insecta
- Order: Lepidoptera
- Family: Depressariidae
- Subfamily: Stenomatinae
- Genus: Antaeotricha; Zeller, 1854

Synonyms
- Mesoptycha Zeller, 1854; Brachiloma Clemens, 1863; Harpalyce Chambers, 1874; Ide Chambers, 1880; Antoeotricha Walsingham, 1881 (misspelling); Aedemoses Walsingham, 1912; Athleta Walsingham, 1912; Prasolithites Meyrick, 1912; Aphanoxena Meyrick, 1915; Psephomeres Meyrick, 1916; Eumiturga Meyrick, 1925

= Antaeotricha =

Largest genus in moth subfamily Stenomatinae

Antaeotricha is a genus of moths. It numbers from 259 to over 400 species in the Western Hemisphere.

== Species ==
- Antaeotricha acrograpta (Meyrick, 1915)
- Antaeotricha acronephela Meyrick, 1915
- Antaeotricha actista (Meyrick, 1913)
- Antaeotricha addon (Busck, 1911)
- Antaeotricha adjunctella (Walker, 1864)
- Antaeotricha admixta (Walsingham, 1913)
- Antaeotricha adornata (Meyrick, 1915)
- Antaeotricha aequabilis (Meyrick, 1916)
- Antaeotricha aerinotata (Butler, 1877)
- Antaeotricha affinis (Felder & Rogenhofer, 1875)
- Antaeotricha aggravata (Meyrick, 1916)
- Antaeotricha aglypta Meyrick, 1925
- Antaeotricha agrioschista (Meyrick, 1927)
- Antaeotricha albicilla (Zeller, 1854)
- Antaeotricha albifrons Zeller, 1877
- Antaeotricha albilimbella (Felder & Rogenhofer, 1875)
- Antaeotricha albitincta (Meyrick, 1930)
- Antaeotricha albovenosa Zeller, 1877
- Antaeotricha albulella (Walker, 1864)
- Antaeotricha amicula Zeller, 1877
- Antaeotricha ammodes (Walsingham, 1913)
- Antaeotricha amphilyta Meyrick, 1916
- Antaeotricha amphizyga Meyrick, 1930
- Antaeotricha anaclintris Meyrick, 1916
- Antaeotricha arachnia (Meyrick, 1915)
- Antaeotricha aratella (Walker, 1864)
- Antaeotricha arizonensis Ferris, 2010 – Ferris's antaeotricha moth
- Antaeotricha argocorys (Meyrick, 1931)
- Antaeotricha arystis Meyrick, 1915
- Antaeotricha assecta Zeller, 1877
- Antaeotricha astynoma (Meyrick, 1915)
- Antaeotricha atmospora (Meyrick, 1925)
- Antaeotricha axena Meyrick, 1916
- Antaeotricha balanocentra (Meyrick, 1915)
- Antaeotricha ballista (Meyrick, 1916)
- Antaeotricha basalis Zeller, 1854
- Antaeotricha basiferella (Walker, 1864)
- Antaeotricha basilaris (Busck, 1914)
- Antaeotricha basirubrella (Walker, 1864)
- Antaeotricha bathrotoma (Meyrick, 1925)
- Antaeotricha biarcuata Meyrick, 1926
- Antaeotricha bicolor (Zeller, 1839)
- Antaeotricha bilinguis (Meyrick, 1918)
- Antaeotricha binubila Zeller, 1854
- Antaeotricha bipupillata Meyrick, 1930
- Antaeotricha bracatingae (Köhler, 1943)
- Antaeotricha brachysaris Meyrick, 1916
- Antaeotricha brochota Meyrick, 1915
- Antaeotricha caenochytis (Meyrick, 1915)
- Antaeotricha camarina Meyrick, 1915
- Antaeotricha campylodes Meyrick, 1916
- Antaeotricha cantharitis (Meyrick, 1916)
- Antaeotricha caprimulga (Walsingham, 1912)
- Antaeotricha capsiformis (Meyrick, 1930)
- Antaeotricha capsulata Meyrick, 1918
- Antaeotricha carabodes (Meyrick, 1915)
- Antaeotricha carabophanes Meyrick, 1932
- Antaeotricha carbasea (Meyrick, 1915)
- Antaeotricha caryograpta (Meyrick, 1930)
- Antaeotricha cathagnista Meyrick, 1925
- Antaeotricha catharactis Meyrick, 1930
- Antaeotricha cedroxyla Meyrick, 1930
- Antaeotricha celidotis Meyrick, 1925
- Antaeotricha ceratistes (Walsingham, 1912)
- Antaeotricha chalastis (Meyrick, 1915)
- Antaeotricha chalinophanes (Meyrick, 1931)
- Antaeotricha chilosema (Meyrick, 1918)
- Antaeotricha christocoma Meyrick, 1915
- Antaeotricha cicadella (Sepp, [1830])
- Antaeotricha cirrhoxantha (Meyrick, 1915)
- Antaeotricha cleopatra Meyrick, 1925
- Antaeotricha cnemosaris (Meyrick, 1925)
- Antaeotricha colposaris (Meyrick, 1925)
- Antaeotricha comosa (Walsingham, 1912)
- Antaeotricha compsographa Meyrick, 1916
- Antaeotricha compsoneura (Meyrick, 1925)
- Antaeotricha confixella (Walker, 1864)
- Antaeotricha congelata Meyrick, 1926
- Antaeotricha coniopa (Meyrick, 1925)
- Antaeotricha constituta (Meyrick, 1925)
- Antaeotricha constricta (Meyrick, 1926)
- Antaeotricha conturbatella (Walker, 1864)
- Antaeotricha copromima (Meyrick, 1930)
- Antaeotricha coriodes Meyrick, 1915
- Antaeotricha corvigera Meyrick, 1915
- Antaeotricha cosmoterma Meyrick, 1930
- Antaeotricha costatella (Walker, 1864)
- Antaeotricha cremastis (Meyrick, 1925)
- Antaeotricha cryeropis Meyrick, 1926
- Antaeotricha crypsiphaea (Meyrick, 1915)
- Antaeotricha cyclobasis Meyrick, 1930
- Antaeotricha cycnolopha (Meyrick, 1925)
- Antaeotricha cycnomorpha Meyrick, 1925
- Antaeotricha cymogramma (Meyrick, 1925)
- Antaeotricha cyprodeta Meyrick, 1930
- Antaeotricha decorosella (Busck, 1908)
- Antaeotricha deltopis Meyrick, 1915
- Antaeotricha demas (Busck, 1911)
- Antaeotricha demotica (Walsingham, 1912)
- Antaeotricha deridens Meyrick, 1925
- Antaeotricha desecta (Meyrick, 1918)
- Antaeotricha destillata (Zeller, 1877)
- Antaeotricha diacta (Meyrick, 1916)
- Antaeotricha diffracta Meyrick, 1916
- Antaeotricha diplarcha Meyrick, 1915
- Antaeotricha diplophaea Meyrick, 1916
- Antaeotricha diplosaris (Meyrick, 1915)
- Antaeotricha dirempta (Zeller, 1855)
- Antaeotricha discalis (Busck, 1914)
- Antaeotricha discolor (Walsingham, 1912)
- Antaeotricha disjecta (Zeller, 1854)
- Antaeotricha dissona (Meyrick, 1925)
- Antaeotricha doleropis (Meyrick, 1915)
- Antaeotricha dromica (Meyrick, 1925)
- Antaeotricha elaeodes (Walsingham, 1913)
- Antaeotricha elatior (Felder & Rogenhofer, 1875)
- Antaeotricha encyclia Meyrick, 1915
- Antaeotricha enodata Meyrick, 1916
- Antaeotricha epicrossa (Meyrick, 1932)
- Antaeotricha epignampta Meyrick, 1915
- Antaeotricha episimbla (Meyrick, 1915)
- Antaeotricha ergates (Walsingham, 1913)
- Antaeotricha erotica (Meyrick, 1916)
- Antaeotricha eucoma Meyrick, 1925
- Antaeotricha euthrinca Meyrick, 1915
- Antaeotricha exasperata (Meyrick, 1916)
- Antaeotricha excisa Meyrick, 1916
- Antaeotricha extenta (Busck, 1920)
- Antaeotricha exusta Meyrick, 1916
- Antaeotricha falsidica (Meyrick, 1915)
- Antaeotricha fasciatum (Busck, 1911)
- Antaeotricha fascicularis Zeller, 1854
- Antaeotricha filiferella (Walker, 1864)
- Antaeotricha floridella Hayden & Dickel, 2015
- Antaeotricha forreri (Walsingham, 1913)
- Antaeotricha fractilinea (Walsingham, 1912)
- Antaeotricha fractinubes (Walsingham, 1912)
- Antaeotricha fraterna (Felder & Rogenhofer, 1875)
- Antaeotricha frontalis (Zeller, 1855)
- Antaeotricha fulta Meyrick, 1926
- Antaeotricha fumifica (Walsingham, 1912)
- Antaeotricha furcata (Walsingham, 1889)
- Antaeotricha fuscorectangulata Duckworth, 1964
- Antaeotricha generatrix Meyrick, 1926
- Antaeotricha glaphyrodes (Meyrick, 1913)
- Antaeotricha glaucescens (Meyrick, 1916)
- Antaeotricha glycerostoma Meyrick, 1915
- Antaeotricha graphopterella (Walker, 1864)
- Antaeotricha gravescens Meyrick, 1926
- Antaeotricha griseanomina Busck, 1934
- Antaeotricha gubernatrix Meyrick, 1925
- Antaeotricha gymnolopha Meyrick, 1925
- Antaeotricha gypsoterma (Meyrick, 1915)
- Antaeotricha habilis (Meyrick, 1915)
- Antaeotricha haesitans (Walsingham, 1912)
- Antaeotricha haplocentra Meyrick, 1925
- Antaeotricha hapsicora Meyrick, 1915
- Antaeotricha helicias Meyrick, 1916
- Antaeotricha hemibathra Meyrick, 1932
- Antaeotricha hemiscia (Walsingham, 1912)
- Antaeotricha herilis Felder & Rogenhofer, 1875
- Antaeotricha heterosaris (Meyrick, 1915)
- Antaeotricha himaea Meyrick, 1916
- Antaeotricha homologa (Meyrick, 1915)
- Antaeotricha horizontias (Meyrick, 1925)
- Antaeotricha humerella (Walker, 1864)
- Antaeotricha humilis (Zeller, 1855) – dotted anteotricha moth
- Antaeotricha hyalophanta (Meyrick, 1932)
- Antaeotricha hydrophora Meyrick, 1925
- Antaeotricha ianthina (Walsingham, 1913)
- Antaeotricha illepida Meyrick, 1916
- Antaeotricha imminens (Meyrick, 1915)
- Antaeotricha immota Meyrick, 1916
- Antaeotricha impactella (Walker, 1864)
- Antaeotricha impedita (Meyrick, 1915)
- Antaeotricha incisurella (Walker, 1864)
- Antaeotricha incompleta Meyrick, 1932
- Antaeotricha incongrua Meyrick, 1932
- Antaeotricha incrassata Meyrick, 1916
- Antaeotricha indicatella (Walker, 1864)
- Antaeotricha infecta (Meyrick, 1930)
- Antaeotricha infrenata (Meyrick, 1918)
- Antaeotricha innexa (Meyrick, 1925)
- Antaeotricha inquinula Zeller, 1854
- Antaeotricha insidiata (Meyrick, 1916)
- Antaeotricha insimulata Meyrick, 1926
- Antaeotricha intersecta (Meyrick, 1916)
- Antaeotricha iopetra (Meyrick, 1932)
- Antaeotricha ioptila (Meyrick, 1915)
- Antaeotricha iras Meyrick, 1926
- Antaeotricha irene (Barnes & Busck, 1920)
- Antaeotricha irenias (Meyrick, 1916)
- Antaeotricha isochyta (Meyrick, 1915)
- Antaeotricha isomeris (Meyrick, 1912)
- Antaeotricha isoplintha (Meyrick, 1925)
- Antaeotricha isoporphyra (Meyrick, 1932)
- Antaeotricha isosticta (Meyrick, 1932)
- Antaeotricha isotona Meyrick, 1932
- Antaeotricha ithytona Meyrick, 1929
- Antaeotricha juvenalis (Meyrick, 1930)
- Antaeotricha lacera (Zeller, 1877)
- Antaeotricha lampyridella (Busck, 1914)
- Antaeotricha lathiptila (Meyrick, 1915)
- Antaeotricha laudata Meyrick, 1916
- Antaeotricha laxa (Meyrick, 1915)
- Antaeotricha lebetias (Meyrick, 1915)
- Antaeotricha lecithaula Meyrick, 1914
- Antaeotricha lepidocarpa (Meyrick, 1930)
- Antaeotricha leptogramma (Meyrick, 1916)
- Antaeotricha leucillana Zeller, 1854 – pale gray bird-dropping moth
- Antaeotricha leucocryptis (Meyrick, 1932)
- Antaeotricha lignicolor Zeller, 1877
- Antaeotricha lindseyi (Barnes & Busck, 1920)
- Antaeotricha lophoptycha (Meyrick, 1925)
- Antaeotricha lophosaris (Meyrick, 1925)
- Antaeotricha loxogrammos (Zeller, 1854)
- Antaeotricha lucrosa (Meyrick, 1925)
- Antaeotricha lunimaculata (Dognin, 1913)
- Antaeotricha lysimeris Meyrick, 1915
- Antaeotricha machetes (Walsingham, 1912)
- Antaeotricha macronota (Meyrick, 1912)
- Antaeotricha malachita Meyrick, 1915
- Antaeotricha manceps Meyrick, 1925
- Antaeotricha manzanitae Keifer, 1937
- Antaeotricha marmorea (Felder & Rogenhofer, 1875)
- Antaeotricha melanarma Meyrick, 1916
- Antaeotricha melanopis Meyrick, 1909
- Antaeotricha mendax (Zeller, 1855)
- Antaeotricha mesosaris (Meyrick, 1925)
- Antaeotricha mesostrota Meyrick, 1912
- Antaeotricha microtypa (Meyrick, 1915)
- Antaeotricha milictis Meyrick, 1925
- Antaeotricha mitratella (Busck, 1914)
- Antaeotricha modulata (Meyrick, 1915)
- Antaeotricha monocolona Meyrick, 1932
- Antaeotricha monosaris (Meyrick, 1915)
- Antaeotricha mundella (Walker, 1864)
- Antaeotricha murinella (Walker, 1864)
- Antaeotricha mustela (Walsingham, 1912)
- Antaeotricha navicularis (Meyrick, 1930)
- Antaeotricha neocrossa (Meyrick, 1925)
- Antaeotricha nephelocyma (Meyrick, 1930)
- Antaeotricha nerteropa Meyrick, 1915
- Antaeotricha neurographa Meyrick, 1922
- Antaeotricha nictitans (Zeller, 1854)
- Antaeotricha nimbata Meyrick, 1925
- Antaeotricha nitescens Meyrick, 1925
- Antaeotricha nitidorella (Walker, 1864)
- Antaeotricha nitrota Meyrick, 1916
- Antaeotricha notogramma (Meyrick, 1930)
- Antaeotricha notosaris (Meyrick, 1925)
- Antaeotricha notosemia (Zeller, 1877)
- Antaeotricha nuclearis Meyrick, 1913
- Antaeotricha obtusa (Meyrick, 1916)
- Antaeotricha ocellifer (Walsingham, 1912)
- Antaeotricha ogmolopha (Meyrick, 1930)
- Antaeotricha ogmosaris (Meyrick, 1915)
- Antaeotricha ophrysta Meyrick, 1912
- Antaeotricha orgadopa (Meyrick, 1925)
- Antaeotricha orthophaea Meyrick, 1930
- Antaeotricha orthotona Meyrick, 1916
- Antaeotricha orthriopa Meyrick, 1925
- Antaeotricha osseella (Walsingham, 1889)
- Antaeotricha ostodes (Walsingham, 1913)
- Antaeotricha ovulifera (Meyrick, 1925)
- Antaeotricha oxycentra Meyrick, 1916
- Antaeotricha oxydecta (Meyrick, 1915)
- Antaeotricha pactota Meyrick, 1915
- Antaeotricha palaestrias Meyrick, 1916
- Antaeotricha pallicosta (Felder & Rogenhofer, 1875)
- Antaeotricha paracrypta Meyrick, 1915
- Antaeotricha paracta (Meyrick, 1915)
- Antaeotricha parastis van Gijen, 1913
- Antaeotricha particularis (Zeller, 1877)
- Antaeotricha pellocoma (Meyrick, 1915)
- Antaeotricha percnocarpa (Meyrick, 1925)
- Antaeotricha percnogona Meyrick, 1925
- Antaeotricha periphrictis (Meyrick, 1915)
- Antaeotricha phaeoneura (Meyrick, 1913)
- Antaeotricha phaeoplintha (Meyrick, 1915)
- Antaeotricha phaeosaris Meyrick, 1915
- Antaeotricha phaselodes (Meyrick, 1931)
- Antaeotricha phaula (Walsingham, 1912)
- Antaeotricha phollicodes (Meyrick, 1916)
- Antaeotricha phryactis Meyrick, 1925
- Antaeotricha planicoma (Meyrick, 1925)
- Antaeotricha platydesma Meyrick, 1915
- Antaeotricha plerotis Meyrick, 1925
- Antaeotricha plesistia (Meyrick, 1930)
- Antaeotricha plumosa (Busck, 1914)
- Antaeotricha polyglypta (Meyrick, 1915)
- Antaeotricha praecisa Meyrick, 1912
- Antaeotricha praerupta Meyrick, 1915
- Antaeotricha pratifera (Meyrick, 1925)
- Antaeotricha prosora (Walsingham, 1912)
- Antaeotricha protosaris Meyrick, 1915
- Antaeotricha pseudochyta Meyrick, 1915
- Antaeotricha ptycta (Walsingham, 1912)
- Antaeotricha pumilis (Busck, 1914)
- Antaeotricha purulenta Zeller, 1877
- Antaeotricha pyrgota (Meyrick, 1930)
- Antaeotricha pyrobathra (Meyrick, 1931)
- Antaeotricha pythonaea Meyrick, 1916
- Antaeotricha quiescens (Meyrick, 1916)
- Antaeotricha radicalis (Zeller, 1877)
- Antaeotricha radicicola Meyrick, 1932
- Antaeotricha reciprocella (Walker, 1864)
- Antaeotricha reductella (Walker, 1864)
- Antaeotricha refractrix Meyrick, 1930
- Antaeotricha renselariana (Stoll, [1781])
- Antaeotricha reprehensa Meyrick, 1926
- Antaeotricha resiliens Meyrick, 1925
- Antaeotricha rhipidaula (Meyrick, 1915)
- Antaeotricha ribbei Zeller, 1877
- Antaeotricha rostriformis (Meyrick, 1916)
- Antaeotricha sana Meyrick, 1926
- Antaeotricha sarcinata Meyrick, 1918
- Antaeotricha sardania Meyrick, 1925
- Antaeotricha scapularis (Meyrick, 1918)
- Antaeotricha schlaegeri (Zeller, 1854) – Schlaeger's fruitworm moth
- Antaeotricha sciospila (Meyrick, 1930)
- Antaeotricha segmentata (Meyrick, 1915)
- Antaeotricha sellifera Meyrick, 1925
- Antaeotricha semicinerea Zeller, 1877
- Antaeotricha semiovata Meyrick, 1926
- Antaeotricha semisignella (Walker, 1864)
- Antaeotricha serangodes Meyrick, 1915
- Antaeotricha serarcha Meyrick, 1930
- Antaeotricha similis (Busck, 1911)
- Antaeotricha smileuta Meyrick, 1915
- Antaeotricha sortifera Meyrick, 1930
- Antaeotricha sparganota Meyrick, 1915
- Antaeotricha spermolitha (Meyrick, 1915)
- Antaeotricha spurca (Zeller, 1855)
- Antaeotricha spurcatella (Walker, 1864)
- Antaeotricha staurota Meyrick, 1916
- Antaeotricha sterrhomitra (Meyrick, 1925)
- Antaeotricha stigmatias (Walsingham, 1913)
- Antaeotricha stringens Meyrick, 1925
- Antaeotricha stygeropa (Meyrick, 1925)
- Antaeotricha subdulcis (Meyrick, 1925)
- Antaeotricha substricta Meyrick, 1918
- Antaeotricha suffumigata Walsingham, 1897
- Antaeotricha superciliosa Meyrick, 1918
- Antaeotricha synercta Meyrick, 1925
- Antaeotricha tectoria (Meyrick, 1915)
- Antaeotricha teleosema Meyrick, 1925
- Antaeotricha tempestiva (Meyrick, 1916)
- Antaeotricha tephrodesma (Meyrick, 1916)
- Antaeotricha tetrapetra (Meyrick, 1925)
- Antaeotricha thammii Zeller, 1877
- Antaeotricha thapsinopa Meyrick, 1916
- Antaeotricha theoretica Meyrick, 1932
- Antaeotricha thesmophora Meyrick, 1915
- Antaeotricha thomasi (Barnes & Busck, 1920)
- Antaeotricha thylacosaris (Meyrick, 1915)
- Antaeotricha thysanodes (Meyrick, 1915)
- Antaeotricha tibialis Zeller, 1877
- Antaeotricha tinactis (Meyrick, 1915)
- Antaeotricha tornogramma Meyrick, 1925
- Antaeotricha tractrix Meyrick, 1925
- Antaeotricha tremulella (Walker, 1864)
- Antaeotricha tribomias (Meyrick, 1915)
- Antaeotricha tricapsis (Meyrick, 1930)
- Antaeotricha trichonota Meyrick, 1926
- Antaeotricha triplectra (Meyrick, 1915)
- Antaeotricha triplintha (Meyrick, 1916)
- Antaeotricha tripustulella (Walker, 1864)
- Antaeotricha trisecta (Walsingham, 1912)
- Antaeotricha trisinuata Meyrick, 1930
- Antaeotricha tritogramma Meyrick, 1925
- Antaeotricha trivallata Meyrick, 1934
- Antaeotricha trochoscia Meyrick, 1915
- Antaeotricha tumens (Meyrick, 1916)
- Antaeotricha umbratella Walker, 1864
- Antaeotricha umbriferella (Walker, 1864)
- Antaeotricha unipunctella (Clemens, 1863)
- Antaeotricha unisecta (Meyrick, 1930)
- Antaeotricha utahensis Ferris, 2012
- Antaeotricha vacata Meyrick, 1925
- Antaeotricha vannifera (Meyrick, 1915)
- Antaeotricha venatum (Busck, 1911)
- Antaeotricha venezuelensis Amsel, 1956
- Antaeotricha virens (Meyrick, 1912)
- Antaeotricha walchiana (Stoll, [1782])
- Antaeotricha xanthopetala (Meyrick, 1931)
- Antaeotricha xuthosaris Meyrick, 1925
- Antaeotricha xylocosma Meyrick, 1916
- Antaeotricha xylurga (Meyrick, 1913)
- Antaeotricha zanclogramma (Meyrick, 1915)
- Antaeotricha zelleri Walsingham & Durrant, 1896
- Antaeotricha zelotes (Walsingham, 1912)

== Former species ==
- Antaeotricha vestalis (Zeller, 1873) – vestal moth
