= Antaeotricha xylurga =

Scientific classification
- Kingdom: Animalia
- Phylum: Arthropoda
- Class: Insecta
- Order: Lepidoptera
- Family: Depressariidae
- Genus: Antaeotricha
- Species: A. xylurga

Binomial name
- Antaeotricha xylurga (Meyrick, 1913)

Synonyms
- Stenoma xylurga Meyrick, 1913

Species of moth

Antaeotricha xylurga is a moth in the family Depressariidae. It was described by Edward Meyrick in 1913. It is found in Peru.

The wingspan is about 17 mm. The forewings are rather light fuscous with a patch of dark fuscous suffusion occupying the basal third of the wing on the dorsal half, extended at the base to the costa, and as a dark fuscous line on the fold nearly to the middle of the wing. There is a narrow slightly curved suffused dark fuscous fascia from the middle of the costa to the dorsum before the tornus and a faint curved darker shade from four-fifths of the costa to the tornus. There is also an obscurely interrupted dark fuscous line around the apex and termen. The hindwings are dark grey.
