= Antaeotricha immota =

Scientific classification
- Domain: Eukaryota
- Kingdom: Animalia
- Phylum: Arthropoda
- Class: Insecta
- Order: Lepidoptera
- Family: Depressariidae
- Genus: Antaeotricha
- Species: A. immota

Binomial name
- Antaeotricha immota Meyrick, 1916

Species of moth

Antaeotricha immota is a moth of the family Depressariidae. It is found in French Guiana and Guyana.

The wingspan is 14–15 mm. The forewings are white, with scattered dark fuscous scales in the disc and towards the dorsum and with dark fuscous markings. There is a longitudinal line from the base of the costa to one-fifth of the disc and, in males, a triangular blotch on the base of the dorsum, another on the middle, and a quadrate blotch before the tornus, not reaching half across the wing. In females, all three are larger and oblong, occupying the dorsum except for narrow interspaces, reaching half across the wing. There is an irregular line from one-fifth of the costa to the second dorsal blotch and a dash in the middle of the disc, terminated by the following line. A very oblique line is found from the costa before the middle to the upper anterior angle of the pre-tornal blotch, somewhat bent above the middle, and a slightly curved line from two-thirds of the costa to its posterior angle. There are eight marginal dots around the apex and termen, the fifth (apical) and often the seventh are somewhat larger. The hindwings are light grey, in males with a long whitish subcostal hairpencil from the base lying beneath the forewings.
