= Antaeotricha christocoma =

Scientific classification
- Domain: Eukaryota
- Kingdom: Animalia
- Phylum: Arthropoda
- Class: Insecta
- Order: Lepidoptera
- Family: Depressariidae
- Genus: Antaeotricha
- Species: A. christocoma

Binomial name
- Antaeotricha christocoma Meyrick, 1915

Species of moth

Antaeotricha christocoma is a moth in the family Depressariidae. It was described by Edward Meyrick in 1915. It is endemic to Peru.

The wingspan is 17–18 millimetres (0.67–0.71 in). The forewings are white with a grey basal patch including a darker violet-bronzy central shade, the edge irregular, running from one-third of the costa to the middle of the dorsum. Beyond this is a grey dorsal patch extending to three-fourths, and reaching to the fold. A somewhat oblique-transverse dark grey mark is found on the end of the cell and there is an irregular strongly curved grey line from beyond the middle of the costa to the end of the dorsal blotch, as well as a grey band occupying about the apical fourth of the wing, including a white line from five-sixths of the costa to the tornus, the terminal edge white preceded by some suffused dark grey dots. The hindwings are grey with the costal margin expanded to beyond the middle, with long rough projecting hairscales suffused with dark grey beneath, and a long whitish subcostal hairpencil lying beneath the forewings.
