= Antaeotricha confixella =

Scientific classification
- Kingdom: Animalia
- Phylum: Arthropoda
- Class: Insecta
- Order: Lepidoptera
- Family: Depressariidae
- Genus: Antaeotricha
- Species: A. confixella

Binomial name
- Antaeotricha confixella (Walker, 1864)

Synonyms
- Cryptolechia confixella Walker, 1864

Species of moth

Antaeotricha confixella is a moth in the family Depressariidae. It was described by Francis Walker in 1864. It is found in Amazonas, Brazil.

Adults are brown, the forewings for nearly one-third of the surface from the base obliquely brown and containing three black basal dots. The exterior surface is partly and slightly clouded with cinereous (ash gray) and there is a black transverse streak beyond the middle, composed of one spot and of three hinder points. There is a cinereous spot near the hinder side of the black spot and a little more exterior. The fringe is cinereous. The hindwings are brownish cinereous, whitish towards the base.
