= Antaeotricha dissona =

Scientific classification
- Kingdom: Animalia
- Phylum: Arthropoda
- Clade: Pancrustacea
- Class: Insecta
- Order: Lepidoptera
- Family: Depressariidae
- Genus: Antaeotricha
- Species: A. dissona

Binomial name
- Antaeotricha dissona (Meyrick, 1925)

Synonyms
- Stenoma dissona Meyrick, 1925

Species of moth

Antaeotricha dissona is a moth of the family Depressariidae. It is found in Brazil (Amazonas).

The wingspan is about 15 mm. The forewings are shining white with a short oblique dark fuscous mark from the base of the costa, and a dark fuscous supramedian dash near the base, as well as a blotch of fuscous suffusion on the basal fourth of the dorsum reaching half across the wing. There is an irregular interrupted gradually expanded fuscous shade from one-fifth of the costa to the middle of the dorsum, marked with the suffused darker first discal stigma, and the blackish elongate plical. There is a fuscous dash towards the costa before the middle and some fuscous sprinkling on the median area of the disc. The second discal stigma is moderate, subtriangular and blackish, an irregular fuscous shade from the middle of the costa passing just beyond this to the dorsum at four-fifths, broad on the lower half, and a strongly curved fuscous line from the costa at three-fifths interrupted above the middle, becoming suffused on the lower half and confluent with the preceding towards the dorsum. There are eight black marginal marks around the posterior part of the costa and termen. The hindwings are grey.
