= Antaeotricha rhipidaula =

Scientific classification
- Kingdom: Animalia
- Phylum: Arthropoda
- Clade: Pancrustacea
- Class: Insecta
- Order: Lepidoptera
- Family: Depressariidae
- Genus: Antaeotricha
- Species: A. rhipidaula

Binomial name
- Antaeotricha rhipidaula (Meyrick, 1915)

Synonyms
- Stenoma rhipidaula Meyrick, 1915

Species of moth

Antaeotricha rhipidaula is a moth of the family Depressariidae. It is found in Guyana.

The wingspan is about 27 mm. The forewings are light ochreous-brown, with the markings darker brown. There is a suffused line along the costal and terminal edge throughout and there are two short irregular oblique suffused lines from the costa towards the base and a short longitudinal streak from the base in the middle. A semi-oval spot is found along the dorsum from one-sixth to the middle and there are two inwardly oblique streaks from the dorsum between this and the tornus, reaching to the lower margin of the cell, posterior partially double above. There is also an indistinct longitudinal line in the disc above these, and an irregular dentate very oblique line from beneath the costa at two-thirds to the upper angle of the cell, these connected with several streaks on the veins beyond the cell, all terminated by a strongly curved line from beyond the middle of the costa to the tornus. The hindwings are dark grey.
