= Antaeotricha anaclintris =

Scientific classification
- Kingdom: Animalia
- Phylum: Arthropoda
- Clade: Pancrustacea
- Class: Insecta
- Order: Lepidoptera
- Family: Depressariidae
- Genus: Antaeotricha
- Species: A. anaclintris

Binomial name
- Antaeotricha anaclintris Meyrick, 1916

Species of moth in genus Antaeotricha

Antaeotricha anaclintris is a species of moth of the family Depressariidae. It is found in French Guiana.

The wingspan is 22–23 mm. The forewings are whitish, more or less tinged with fuscous except towards the costa and with a blackish or dark purplish-fuscous elongate patch extending along the basal third of the dorsum, reaching the costa at the base. There is an irregular interrupted fuscous line from one-fifth of the costa to the dorsum just beyond this, darkest on the costa, sometimes obsolete dorsally. A blackish-fuscous transverse dot is found on the end of the cell and there is a curved irregular fuscous shade from the costa beyond the middle to three-fourths of the dorsum, as well as a fuscous spot on the costa at three-fourths, and a rather curved fuscous shade from beneath this to the dorsum before the tornus. A waved cloudy dark fuscous line is found just within the apical edge. The hindwings are grey, the basal half suffused with whitish and the costa expanded from the base to two-thirds, with long rough projecting hairscales suffused with rather dark fuscous beneath, and a moderate whitish subcostal hairpencil from the base lying in an ochreous groove concealed by the forewings.
