= Antaeotricha excisa =

Scientific classification
- Domain: Eukaryota
- Kingdom: Animalia
- Phylum: Arthropoda
- Class: Insecta
- Order: Lepidoptera
- Family: Depressariidae
- Genus: Antaeotricha
- Species: A. excisa

Binomial name
- Antaeotricha excisa Meyrick, 1916

Species of moth

Antaeotricha excisa is a species of moth of the family Depressariidae. It is found in the Guianas and Brazil.

The wingspan is 18–20 mm. The forewings are white with a violet-grey basal patch suffusedly spotted with dark fuscous occupying one-fourth of the wing, the edge slightly oblique and with two small cloudy fuscous spots on the dorsum towards the middle. There is a black dot on the lower angle of the cell, and a fuscous one on the upper, as well as a curved series of several small indistinct fuscous marks running from the costa beyond the middle to the dorsum before the tornus and a somewhat sinuate indistinct fuscous shade from five-sixths of the costa to the tornus. A cloudy dark fuscous spot is found on the apex and upper part of the termen. The hindwings are ochreous-grey-whitish with the costa expanded from the base to two-thirds and with a broad projection of long rough hairscales suffused with grey beneath, and a long whitish subcostal hairpencil lying in an ochreous groove from the base concealed beneath the forewings.
