= Antaeotricha paracta =

Scientific classification
- Domain: Eukaryota
- Kingdom: Animalia
- Phylum: Arthropoda
- Class: Insecta
- Order: Lepidoptera
- Family: Depressariidae
- Genus: Antaeotricha
- Species: A. paracta

Binomial name
- Antaeotricha paracta (Meyrick, 1915)

Synonyms
- Stenoma paracta Meyrick, 1915

Species of moth

Antaeotricha paracta is a moth of the family Depressariidae. It is found in Peru and Colombia.

The wingspan is about 26 mm. The forewings are white, with a few scattered fuscous scales and a narrow pale fuscous streak along the basal third of the costa. The dorsal two-fifths is light fuscous, marked with some dark fuscous suffusion on the dorsum towards the base, and two subtriangular slightly inwards-oblique dark fuscous blotches at two-fifths and four-fifths, as well as a cloudy dark fuscous dot above the fold before the apex of the first dorsal blotch, and three forming an oblique series in the middle of the disc with the apex of the second. There is a curved series of six dark fuscous dots from three-fourths of the disc to the tornus, and a dot towards the costa at four-fifths, as well as six blackish marginal dots around the apex and termen. The hindwings are light grey.
