= Antaeotricha utahensis =

Scientific classification
- Domain: Eukaryota
- Kingdom: Animalia
- Phylum: Arthropoda
- Class: Insecta
- Order: Lepidoptera
- Family: Depressariidae
- Genus: Antaeotricha
- Species: A. utahensis

Binomial name
- Antaeotricha utahensis Ferris, 2012

Species of moth

Antaeotricha utahensis is a moth in the family Depressariidae. It was described by Clifford D. Ferris in 2012. It is endemic to North America, where it has been recorded in Utah and New Mexico.
