= Antaeotricha spermolitha =

Scientific classification
- Domain: Eukaryota
- Kingdom: Animalia
- Phylum: Arthropoda
- Class: Insecta
- Order: Lepidoptera
- Family: Depressariidae
- Genus: Antaeotricha
- Species: A. spermolitha

Binomial name
- Antaeotricha spermolitha (Meyrick, 1915)

Synonyms
- Stenoma spermolitha Meyrick, 1915

Species of moth

Antaeotricha spermolitha is a moth of the family Depressariidae. It is found in Guyana.

The wingspan is about 23 mm. The forewings are pale fuscous, irrorated with dark fuscous and with the extreme costal edge whitish-ochreous from one-fourth onwards. The dorsal scale-projection towards the base is rather conspicuous, whitish-ochreous, irrorated with dark grey and there is a small blackish dot on the costal edge at two-fifths and a marginal series of small blackish marks placed in a whitish-ochreous line along the posterior half of the costa and termen. The hindwings are grey.
