= Antaeotricha insidiata =

Scientific classification
- Domain: Eukaryota
- Kingdom: Animalia
- Phylum: Arthropoda
- Class: Insecta
- Order: Lepidoptera
- Family: Depressariidae
- Genus: Antaeotricha
- Species: A. insidiata

Binomial name
- Antaeotricha insidiata (Meyrick, 1916)

Synonyms
- Stenoma insidiata Meyrick, 1916; Stenoma insidiana

Species of moth

Antaeotricha insidiata is a moth of the family Depressariidae. It is found in French Guiana.

The wingspan is 19–22 mm. The forewings are white with a faint violet tinge, sometimes tinged or sprinkled with violet-grey on the dorsal area. The markings are dark fuscous. There is a suffused straight streak from the base of the costa to one-fifth of the dorsum and an irregular somewhat curved line from above the middle at one-fifth to the middle of the dorsum, expanded dorsally. An irregular slightly curved line is found from the middle of the costa to four-fifths of the dorsum, sometimes marked with a distinct dot in the middle, dilated at the extremities. There is also a curved line from three-fourths of the costa to the tornus, slightly indented beneath the costa. Eight marginal dots are found around the apex and termen. The hindwings are grey, anteriorly paler and whitish-tinged and with the costa expanded and edged with rough whitish scales from the base to two-thirds, then abruptly sinuate-incised, with a yellow subcostal groove from the base to the middle.
