= Antaeotricha cycnomorpha =

Scientific classification
- Domain: Eukaryota
- Kingdom: Animalia
- Phylum: Arthropoda
- Class: Insecta
- Order: Lepidoptera
- Family: Depressariidae
- Genus: Antaeotricha
- Species: A. cycnomorpha

Binomial name
- Antaeotricha cycnomorpha Meyrick, 1925

Species of moth

Antaeotricha cycnomorpha is a moth in the family Depressariidae. It was described by Edward Meyrick in 1925. It is found in Brazil.
