= Antaeotricha subdulcis =

Scientific classification
- Domain: Eukaryota
- Kingdom: Animalia
- Phylum: Arthropoda
- Class: Insecta
- Order: Lepidoptera
- Family: Depressariidae
- Genus: Antaeotricha
- Species: A. subdulcis

Binomial name
- Antaeotricha subdulcis (Meyrick, 1925)

Synonyms
- Stenoma subdulcis Meyrick, 1925; Stenoma remorsa Meyrick, 1925

Species of moth

Antaeotricha subdulcis is a moth of the family Depressariidae. It is found in Brazil (Para) and Bolivia.

The wingspan is about 16 mm for males and 30 mm for females. Males have pale grey forewings with a broad white costal band from the base to near the apex, posteriorly pointed, the costal edge ochreous-tinged, below the band a streak of whitish-ochreous suffusion to the end of the cell. There is an inwards-oblique irregular dark fuscous streak from the dorsum beyond the middle to the fold, some slight suffusion about the fold before and beyond this. There is a waved ochreous-whitish terminal line. The hindwings are light grey. Females have whitish-ochreous forewings with an oval blackish blotch along the anterior half of the dorsum and a triangular blackish blotch extending in the disc from one-third to two-thirds, separated from the preceding by an oblique curved streak of ground colour, and connected with the dorsum by an oblique blackish streak beyond this. There are four blackish interneural streaks in the costal area and on the terminal area a band formed of confluent interneural streaks of grey suffusion, not reaching the discal blotch or termen. The hindwings are light grey, rather darker towards the apex.
