= Antaeotricha trivallata =

Scientific classification
- Kingdom: Animalia
- Phylum: Arthropoda
- Class: Insecta
- Order: Lepidoptera
- Family: Depressariidae
- Genus: Antaeotricha
- Species: A. trivallata

Binomial name
- Antaeotricha trivallata Meyrick, 1934

Species of moth

Antaeotricha trivallata is a moth in the family Depressariidae. It was described by Edward Meyrick in 1934. It is found in Costa Rica.
