= Antaeotricha zanclogramma =

Scientific classification
- Domain: Eukaryota
- Kingdom: Animalia
- Phylum: Arthropoda
- Class: Insecta
- Order: Lepidoptera
- Family: Depressariidae
- Genus: Antaeotricha
- Species: A. zanclogramma

Binomial name
- Antaeotricha zanclogramma (Meyrick, 1915)

Synonyms
- Stenoma zanclogramma Meyrick, 1915

Species of moth

Antaeotricha zanclogramma is a moth of the family Depressariidae. It is found in Guyana.

The wingspan is about 17 mm. The forewings are white with a small grey mark on the base of the costa and a fuscous longitudinal median line from the base to one-third and an elongate patch of dark grey suffusion extending along the dorsum from the base to the middle, as well as a trapezoidal dark fuscous blotch on the dorsum beyond the middle, reaching half across the wing. There is a straight very oblique dark fuscous line from the costa before the middle almost reaching the posterior angle of this. A dark fuscous line is found from before three-fourths of the costa to near the middle of the termen, then strongly curved round to the tornus, the space between the lower part of this and the preceding blotch suffused with grey. Three bilobed black marginal marks are found around the apex, and there is a black dot above and two below these. The hindwings are pale grey, the apex whitish-tinged, with two or three dark fuscous marginal marks.
