= Antaeotricha lathiptila =

Scientific classification
- Domain: Eukaryota
- Kingdom: Animalia
- Phylum: Arthropoda
- Class: Insecta
- Order: Lepidoptera
- Family: Depressariidae
- Genus: Antaeotricha
- Species: A. lathiptila

Binomial name
- Antaeotricha lathiptila (Meyrick, 1915)

Synonyms
- Stenoma lathiptila Meyrick, 1915

Species of moth

Antaeotricha lathiptila is a moth of the family Depressariidae. It is found in Guyana.

The wingspan is 17–18 mm. The forewings are whitish-fuscous with a dark fuscous streak from the middle of the base along the dorsum to about one-fourth. There are three irregular oblique transverse suffused dark fuscous lines, the first from or near the costa before one-fourth to the middle of the dorsum, where it sometimes forms a spot, the second from the middle of the costa to four-fifths of the dorsum, sometimes suffusedly expanded posteriorly towards the dorsum, the third from two-thirds of the costa to the tornus, somewhat curved. There are eight sometimes connected dark fuscous marginal dots around the apical part of the costa and termen. The hindwings are light grey in males and grey in females. The costal margin in males is rather strongly expanded and rough-scaled from the base to three-fifths, where it ceases abruptly so as to appear emarginate. The forewings in males beneath with a subdorsal fringe of whitish hairs from the base to the middle covered by expansion of the hindwings.
