= Antaeotricha macronota =

Scientific classification
- Kingdom: Animalia
- Phylum: Arthropoda
- Class: Insecta
- Order: Lepidoptera
- Family: Depressariidae
- Genus: Antaeotricha
- Species: A. macronota

Binomial name
- Antaeotricha macronota (Meyrick, 1912)

Synonyms
- Stenoma macronota Meyrick, 1912

Species of moth

Antaeotricha macronota is a moth of the family Depressariidae. It is found in Colombia and Suriname.

The wingspan is 24–27 mm. The forewings are rosy-brownish or rosy-fuscous, more or less tinged or suffused with darker violet-fuscous on the dorsal half and posteriorly, darkest in males and with the costal edge ferruginous in females. A darker brown streak rises from the costa at one-fourth and runs above the cell to its upper angle. There is also a white dot at the lower angle of the cell. The hindwings have a greyish cilia in males and a pale ochreous cilia in females.
