= Antaeotricha cymogramma =

Scientific classification
- Domain: Eukaryota
- Kingdom: Animalia
- Phylum: Arthropoda
- Class: Insecta
- Order: Lepidoptera
- Family: Depressariidae
- Genus: Antaeotricha
- Species: A. cymogramma

Binomial name
- Antaeotricha cymogramma (Meyrick, 1925)

Synonyms
- Stenoma cymogramma Meyrick, 1925; Stenopa cymogramma

Species of moth

Antaeotricha cymogramma is a moth of the family Depressariidae. It is found in Peru, Guyana and French Guiana.

The wingspan is 18–19 mm. The forewings are light brownish grey, paler or whitish tinged towards the costa anteriorly, the costal edge white. There are three somewhat curved oblique dark fuscous lines, the first two irregular, the first from towards the costa at one-fourth to the dorsum beyond the middle, thickened dorsally, the second from the middle of the costa to the dorsum at four-fifths, the second discal stigma perceptible on this, the third from the costa at three-fourths rather abruptly curved on the lower half to the dorsum just before the tornus. There are eight blackish marginal dots around the posterior part of the costa and termen. The hindwings are pale grey, whitish-tinged anteriorly.
