= Antaeotricha insimulata =

Scientific classification
- Kingdom: Animalia
- Phylum: Arthropoda
- Class: Insecta
- Order: Lepidoptera
- Family: Depressariidae
- Genus: Antaeotricha
- Species: A. insimulata

Binomial name
- Antaeotricha insimulata Meyrick, 1926

Species of moth

Antaeotricha insimulata is a moth of the family Depressariidae. It is found in Colombia. The holotype was collected at an altitude of 2,000 m (6,600 ft).

== Description ==
The wingspan is about 26 mm. The forewings are light greyish-ochreous, the costal edge whitish except towards the extremities. The second discal stigma is dark fuscous and there is a faintly indicated curved waved fuscous shade from before the middle of the costa to the dorsum at two-thirds. There is a more distinct similar line from the costa at three-fifths to the dorsum before the tornus, with a narrow acute indentation above the middle and a marginal series of blackish dots around the apical part of the costa and termen. The hindwings are pale greyish with the costa anteriorly slightly expanded and with an ochreous-whitish subcostal hairpencil from the base to the middle.
