= Antaeotricha pratifera =

Scientific classification
- Domain: Eukaryota
- Kingdom: Animalia
- Phylum: Arthropoda
- Class: Insecta
- Order: Lepidoptera
- Family: Depressariidae
- Genus: Antaeotricha
- Species: A. pratifera

Binomial name
- Antaeotricha pratifera (Meyrick, 1925)

Synonyms
- Stenoma pratifera Meyrick, 1925

Species of moth

Antaeotricha pratifera is a moth of the family Depressariidae. It is found in Costa Rica.

The wingspan is about 20 mm. The forewings are light brown strewn with grey dots and strigulae. The costal edge is ochreous-yellowish and there is a light moss-green somewhat darker-mottled patch occupying the posterior part of the wing except a narrow terminal fascia of greyish suffusion, the anterior edge running from the costa at two-fifths directly half across the wing, then outwards to the end of the cell, and again directly to the dorsum at two-thirds, with a white dot on lower angle of the cell. The hindwings are whitish-yellowish, the basal half partially suffused pale grey.
