= Antaeotricha milictis =

Scientific classification
- Domain: Eukaryota
- Kingdom: Animalia
- Phylum: Arthropoda
- Class: Insecta
- Order: Lepidoptera
- Family: Depressariidae
- Genus: Antaeotricha
- Species: A. milictis

Binomial name
- Antaeotricha milictis Meyrick, 1925

Species of moth

Antaeotricha milictis is a moth in the family Depressariidae. It was described by Edward Meyrick in 1925. It is found in Colombia and Brazil.

The wingspan is about 21 mm. The forewings are white with a pale ochreous line on the basal fifth of the costa and then just beneath the costa to beyond the middle, two short oblique greyish-ochreous projections from this towards the base. The dorsal area below the fold is suffused pale greyish-ochreous, with a triangular dark fuscous spot at three-fourths and cloudy greyish-ochreous or fuscous dots on the fold just before the middle and midway between this and the base, one above and between these, one in the disc at three-fourths, and one obliquely before and above this. Several cloudy pale brownish-ochreous dots indicate a partial subterminal and pre-marginal series in the disc. The hindwings are ochreous-grey-whitish, the apex narrowly white and with the costa dilated on the anterior half, with a large broad projecting fringe of dense white and dark grey scales and an ochreous-whitish subcostal hairpencil from the base lying beneath the forewings.
