= Antaeotricha diplosaris =

Scientific classification
- Domain: Eukaryota
- Kingdom: Animalia
- Phylum: Arthropoda
- Class: Insecta
- Order: Lepidoptera
- Family: Depressariidae
- Genus: Antaeotricha
- Species: A. diplosaris

Binomial name
- Antaeotricha diplosaris (Meyrick, 1915)

Synonyms
- Stenoma diplosaris Meyrick, 1915

Species of moth

Antaeotricha diplosaris is a moth of the family Depressariidae. It is found in Guyana.

The wingspan is about 15 mm. The forewings are white with a small dark fuscous mark on the base of the costa and with the dorsal half dark fuscous throughout, but not quite reaching the termen at the upper edge, widened by slight steps at one-third and two-thirds, with a small spot of whitish suffusion at two-thirds. There is a dark fuscous longitudinal mark in the disc at one-third and an oblique fuscous linear mark above the middle of the disc, sometimes faint. A slightly curved dark fuscous line is found from three-fourths of the costa to the extremity of the dark fuscous area. There are six lunulate dark fuscous marginal marks around the apex and termen, two at the apex more blackish and preceded by some dark fuscous suffusion. The hindwings are white, in females faintly greyish-tinged towards the middle of the termen, the margin dark fuscous on each side of the apex. In males, there is a long whitish-ochreous hairpencil enclosed in a subdorsal fold.
