= Antaeotricha iopetra =

Scientific classification
- Domain: Eukaryota
- Kingdom: Animalia
- Phylum: Arthropoda
- Class: Insecta
- Order: Lepidoptera
- Family: Depressariidae
- Genus: Antaeotricha
- Species: A. iopetra

Binomial name
- Antaeotricha iopetra (Meyrick, 1932)

Synonyms
- Stenoma iopetra Meyrick, 1932

Species of moth

Antaeotricha iopetra is a moth in the family Depressariidae. It was described by Edward Meyrick in 1932. It is found in Guatemala.

The wingspan is about 24 mm. The hindwings are dark grey.
