= Antaeotricha basalis =

Scientific classification
- Kingdom: Animalia
- Phylum: Arthropoda
- Clade: Pancrustacea
- Class: Insecta
- Order: Lepidoptera
- Family: Depressariidae
- Genus: Antaeotricha
- Species: A. basalis

Binomial name
- Antaeotricha basalis Zeller, 1854

Synonyms
- Antaeotricha harpobathra Meyrick, 1916

Species of moth in genus Antaeotricha

Antaeotricha basalis is a species of moth of the family Depressariidae. It is found in Argentina.

The wingspan is about 27 mm. The forewings are ochreous-whitish with three short blackish bars suffused together with grey forming an elongate blotch along the basal fourth of the costa and with projecting ochreous-whitish dorsal scales. There is a fine linear fuscous dot on the fold at one-third of the wing and a blackish-fuscous dot at the end of the cell, as well as a faint pale fuscous irregular curved shade from beyond the middle of the costa to three-fourths of the dorsum and a faint light fuscous rather curved shade terminating in the tornus, not nearly reaching the costa. A fuscous elongate mark is found on the costa at three-fourths and there are two or three small cloudy fuscous spots around the apex. The hindwings are whitish-grey, becoming whitish anteriorly. The costa is expanded from the base to two-thirds, with a broad projection of long rough hairscales suffused with dark grey beneath, and a long whitish subcostal hairpencil from the base lying beneath the forewings.
