= Antaeotricha periphrictis =

Scientific classification
- Kingdom: Animalia
- Phylum: Arthropoda
- Class: Insecta
- Order: Lepidoptera
- Family: Depressariidae
- Genus: Antaeotricha
- Species: A. periphrictis

Binomial name
- Antaeotricha periphrictis (Meyrick, 1915)

Synonyms
- Stenoma periphrictis Meyrick, 1915

Species of moth

Antaeotricha periphrictis is a moth of the family Depressariidae. It is found in Guyana.

The wingspan is about 18 mm. The forewings are glossy grey with the extreme costal edge whitish, passing into a fine waved whitish line running around the apex and termen. There is a cloudy somewhat darker spot on the end of the cell, and a whitish mark beneath it. The hindwings are grey.
