= Antaeotricha constituta =

Scientific classification
- Domain: Eukaryota
- Kingdom: Animalia
- Phylum: Arthropoda
- Class: Insecta
- Order: Lepidoptera
- Family: Depressariidae
- Genus: Antaeotricha
- Species: A. constituta

Binomial name
- Antaeotricha constituta (Meyrick, 1925)

Synonyms
- Stenoma constituta Meyrick, 1925

Species of moth

Antaeotricha constituta is a moth of the family Depressariidae. It was described by Edward Meyrick in 1925. It is endemic to French Guiana.

The wingspan is about 18 millimetres (0.71 in). The forewings are brownish grey, the extreme costal edge white and with some darker suffusion towards the dorsum near the base, as well as a slightly curved irregular darker shade from one-fourth of the costa gradually expanded to the middle of the dorsum, preceded by some irregular whitish suffusion except towards the dorsum. There is an irregular dark fuscous shade from the costa beyond the middle to the dorsum at four-fifths, preceded by a white shade, and one rather sinuate from costa at four-fifths to the tornus followed by a white shade, the space between these uniformly infuscated to form a darker band. The apical area is mixed with white irroration (sprinkling) and there are eight blackish nearly connected marginal marks around the apex and termen. The hindwings are grey.
