= Antaeotricha modulata =

Scientific classification
- Domain: Eukaryota
- Kingdom: Animalia
- Phylum: Arthropoda
- Class: Insecta
- Order: Lepidoptera
- Family: Depressariidae
- Genus: Antaeotricha
- Species: A. modulata

Binomial name
- Antaeotricha modulata (Meyrick, 1915)

Synonyms
- Stenoma modulata Meyrick, 1915

Species of moth

Antaeotricha modulata is a species of moth of the family Depressariidae. It is found in Brazil, Guyana and French Guiana.

The wingspan is about 17 mm. The forewings are brownish with the base narrowly suffused with dark fuscous and beyond this an ochreous spot beneath the costa, surrounded with dark fuscous. At one-fourth of the costa is a dark brown spot becoming blackish on the costa, where an irregular dark fuscous line runs to a triangular dark fuscous blotch on the middle of the dorsum. There is a dark brown elongate-triangular blotch extending on the costa from two-fifths to three-fourths, posteriorly limited by a blackish line edged posteriorly with whitish suffusion, rather irregularly curved outwards on the upper half, abruptly sinuate in the middle, then running straight to the tornus. Between this and the dorsal blotch is a yellowish spot edged above with blackish and there is also a transverse dark fuscous discal spot on the end of the cell, surrounded with some ochreous-whitish suffusion. Beneath this an indistinct dark fuscous line runs from the apex of costal blotch to the dorsal blotch and there are some whitish-yellowish suffusion adjoining the white margin of the costal blotch towards the apex of the wing. There is a series of blackish partially connected marks around the posterior part of the costa and termen, anteriorly whitish-edged. The hindwings are blackish-grey.
