= Snellenia flavipennis =

Scientific classification
- Domain: Eukaryota
- Kingdom: Animalia
- Phylum: Arthropoda
- Class: Insecta
- Order: Lepidoptera
- Family: Stathmopodidae
- Genus: Snellenia
- Species: S. flavipennis

Binomial name
- Snellenia flavipennis (C. Felder, R. Felder & Rogenhofer, 1875)

Synonyms
- Eretmocera flavipennis R. Felder and Rogenhofer, 1875; Pseudaegeria flavipennis

Species of moth

Snellenia flavipennis is a species of moth of the Stathmopodidae family. It was described by Cajetan Felder, Rudolf Felder and Alois Friedrich Rogenhofer in 1875.

== Taxonomy ==
Walsingham concluded it is closely related to Snellenia sesioides (now considered a synonym of Snellenia lineata) from Australia.
