= Scopula pedilata =

Scientific classification
- Domain: Eukaryota
- Kingdom: Animalia
- Phylum: Arthropoda
- Class: Insecta
- Order: Lepidoptera
- Family: Geometridae
- Genus: Scopula
- Species: S. pedilata

Binomial name
- Scopula pedilata (C. Felder, R. Felder & Rogenhofer, 1875)

Synonyms
- Acidalia pedilata Felder & Rogenhofer, 1875

Species of geometer moth in subfamily Sterrhinae

Scopula pedilata is a moth of the family Geometridae. It is found in Sri Lanka.

== Description ==
Its wingspan is about 22 mm. It is a white moth with fuscous palpi. Forewings irrorated (sprinkled) with a few black scales and with two minute cell-specks. There are traces of a medial line angled below the costa. The postmedial line running out to two angles below costa and one on vein 3. A rufous-brown band found beyond it with waved outer edge and terminating in a black patch. Traces of a pale submarginal rufous line. Hindwings with slightly waved antemedial line. Black cell-speck present. Postmedial slightly sinuous line, with pale rufous band beyond it. A crenulate (scalloped) marginal line.
