= Antaeotricha albilimbella =

Scientific classification
- Kingdom: Animalia
- Phylum: Arthropoda
- Clade: Pancrustacea
- Class: Insecta
- Order: Lepidoptera
- Family: Depressariidae
- Genus: Antaeotricha
- Species: A. albilimbella

Binomial name
- Antaeotricha albilimbella (Felder & Rogenhofer, 1875)

Synonyms
- Gelechia albilimbella Felder & Rogenhofer, 1875; Stenoma nuntia Meyrick, 1925

Species of moth in genus Antaeotricha

Antaeotricha albilimbella is a moth in the family Depressariidae. It was described by Cajetan Felder, Rudolf Felder and Alois Friedrich Rogenhofer in 1875. It is found in Brazil (Amazonas) and Peru.
