= Pyrausta chilialis =

Scientific classification
- Kingdom: Animalia
- Phylum: Arthropoda
- Class: Insecta
- Order: Lepidoptera
- Family: Crambidae
- Genus: Pyrausta
- Species: P. chilialis

Binomial name
- Pyrausta chilialis (C. Felder, R. Felder & Rogenhofer, 1875)

Synonyms
- Botys chilialis C. Felder, R. Felder & Rogenhofer, 1875; Pyrausta metachrysalis Hampson, 1913; Pyrausta metachrysalis ab. patagoniensis Neunzig & Goodson, 1992

Species of moth

Pyrausta chilialis is a moth in the family Crambidae. It was described by Cajetan von Felder, Rudolf Felder and Alois Friedrich Rogenhofer in 1875. It is found in Chile.
