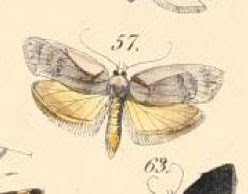

Scientific classification
- Kingdom: Animalia
- Phylum: Arthropoda
- Class: Insecta
- Order: Lepidoptera
- Family: Xyloryctidae
- Genus: Gonioma
- Species: G. hospita

Binomial name
- Gonioma hospita (C. Felder, R. Felder & Rogenhofer, 1875)

Synonyms
- Cryptolechia hospita Felder & Rogenhofer, 1875

= Gonioma hospita =

Species of moth

Gonioma hospita is a moth in the family Xyloryctidae. It was described by Cajetan Felder, Rudolf Felder and Alois Friedrich Rogenhofer in 1875. It is found in Australia, where it has been recorded from Queensland.

The wingspan is about 27 mm. The forewings are white mixed with light grey, and with a few scattered black scales. There is a narrow oblique transverse black streak from the costa near the base, reaching half across the wing and a cloudy grey spot in the middle of the disc. The hindwings are light yellow ochreous, with a grey apical patch.
