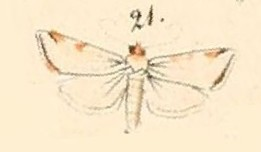

Scientific classification
- Domain: Eukaryota
- Kingdom: Animalia
- Phylum: Arthropoda
- Class: Insecta
- Order: Lepidoptera
- Family: Crambidae
- Tribe: Argyriini
- Genus: Argyria; Hübner, 1818

= Argyria (moth) =

Genus of moths

Argyria is a genus of moths of the family Crambidae. The genus was described by Jacob Hübner in 1818.

== Species ==
- Argyria argyrodis Dyar, 1914
- Argyria argyrostola (Hampson, 1919)
- Argyria centrifugens Dyar, 1914
- Argyria contiguella (Zeller, 1872)
- Argyria croceicinctella (Walker, 1863)
- Argyria croceivittella (Walker, 1863)
- Argyria diplomochalis Dyar, 1913
- Argyria divisella Walker, 1866
- Argyria hannemanni Błeszyński, 1960
- Argyria heringi Błeszyński, 1960
- Argyria insons C. Felder, R. Felder & Rogenhofer, 1875
- Argyria interrupta (Zeller, 1866)
- Argyria lacteella (Fabricius, 1794)
- Argyria lucidellus (Zeller, 1839)
- Argyria lusella (Zeller, 1863)
- Argyria mesogramma Dyar, 1913
- Argyria multifacta Dyar, 1914
- Argyria nummulalis Hübner, 1818
- Argyria opposita Zeller, 1877
- Argyria oxytoma Meyrick, 1932
- Argyria plumbolinealis Hampson, 1896
- Argyria polyniphas Meyrick, 1932
- Argyria pontiella Zeller, 1877
- Argyria quevedella Schaus, 1922
- Argyria rufisignella (Zeller, 1872)
- Argyria schausella Dyar, 1913
- Argyria sericina (Zeller, 1881)
- Argyria sordipes Zeller, 1877
- Argyria subaenescens (Walker, 1863)
- Argyria subtilis C. Felder, R. Felder & Rogenhofer, 1875
- Argyria supposita Dyar, 1914
- Argyria tripsacas (Dyar, 1921)
- Argyria tunuistrigella Schaus, 1922
- Argyria venatella (Schaus, 1922)
- Argyria vesta Błeszyński, 1962
- Argyria vestalis Butler, 1878
- Argyria xanthoguma Dyar, 1914

== Former species ==
- Argyria antonialis Schaus, 1922
- Argyria mesodonta Zeller, 1877
- Argyria mesozonalis Hampson, 1919
- Argyria submesodonta Błeszyński, 1960
