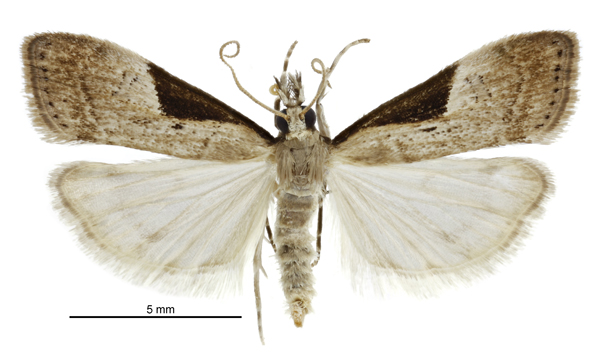
- Male
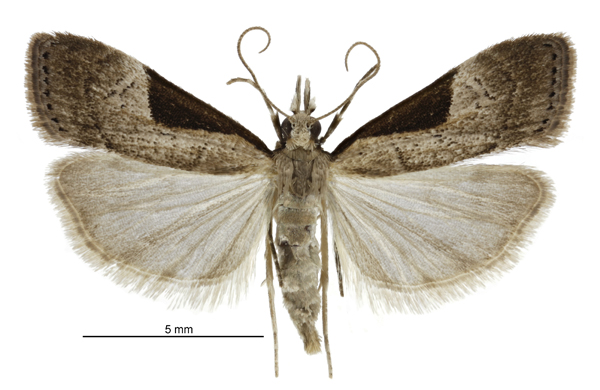
- Female

Scientific classification
- Kingdom: Animalia
- Phylum: Arthropoda
- Class: Insecta
- Order: Lepidoptera
- Family: Crambidae
- Genus: Eudonia
- Species: E. pongalis

Binomial name
- Eudonia pongalis (C. Felder, R. Felder & Rogenhofer, 1875)

Synonyms
- Scoparia pongalis C. Felder, R. Felder & Rogenhofer, 1875

= Eudonia pongalis =

Species of moth

Eudonia pongalis is a moth in the family Crambidae. It was described by Cajetan Felder, Rudolf Felder and Alois Friedrich Rogenhofer in 1875. It is endemic to New Zealand.

The wingspan is 15–19 mm. The forewings are pale whitish grey, slightly tinged with ochreous and with a few scattered grey and black scales. The first line is indicated by a short cloudy blackish oblique streak from the inner margin. The costa is black from the base to beyond the middle. The second line is distinctly dark margined. The hindwings are whitish in males and very pale whitish grey in females. The postmedian line and hindmargin are very faintly greyer. Adults have been recorded on wing in March.
