= Antaeotricha elatior =

Scientific classification
- Kingdom: Animalia
- Phylum: Arthropoda
- Clade: Pancrustacea
- Class: Insecta
- Order: Lepidoptera
- Family: Depressariidae
- Genus: Antaeotricha
- Species: A. elatior

Binomial name
- Antaeotricha elatior (Felder & Rogenhofer, 1875)

Synonyms
- Cryptolechia elatior Felder & Rogenhofer, 1875

Species of moth

Antaeotricha elatior is a moth in the family Depressariidae. It was described by Cajetan Felder, Rudolf Felder and Alois Friedrich Rogenhofer in 1875. It is found in Brazil (Amazonas).
