= Antaeotricha pallicosta =

Scientific classification
- Domain: Eukaryota
- Kingdom: Animalia
- Phylum: Arthropoda
- Class: Insecta
- Order: Lepidoptera
- Family: Depressariidae
- Genus: Antaeotricha
- Species: A. pallicosta

Binomial name
- Antaeotricha pallicosta (Felder & Rogenhofer, 1875)

Synonyms
- Cryptolechia pallicosta Felder & Rogenhofer, 1875

Species of moth

Antaeotricha pallicosta is a moth in the family Depressariidae. It was described by Cajetan Felder, Rudolf Felder and Alois Friedrich Rogenhofer in 1875. It is found in Brazil (Amazonas).
