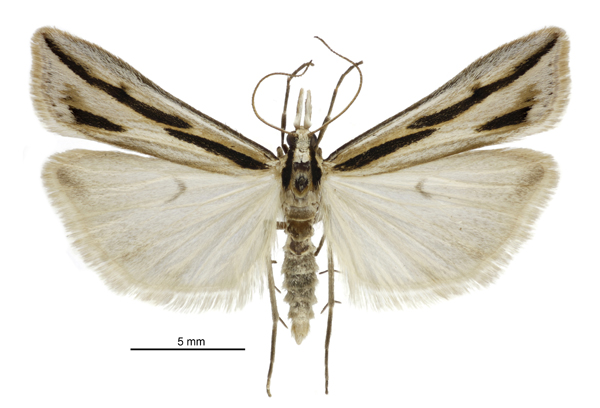
- male
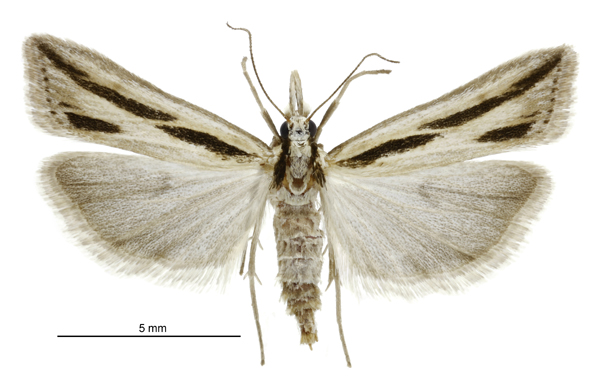
- female'

Scientific classification
- Kingdom: Animalia
- Phylum: Arthropoda
- Class: Insecta
- Order: Lepidoptera
- Family: Crambidae
- Genus: Eudonia
- Species: E. trivirgatus

Binomial name
- Eudonia trivirgatus (C. Felder, R. Felder & Rogenhofer, 1875)

Synonyms
- Crambus trivirgatus C. Felder, R. Felder & Rogenhofer, 1875; Scoparia trivirgatus Scoparia trivirgata; Eudonia trivirgata

= Eudonia trivirgatus =

Species of moth

Eudonia trivirgatus is a moth in the family Crambidae. It was first described by Cajetan Felder, Rudolf Felder and Alois Friedrich Rogenhofer in 1875 as Crambus trivirgatus. It is endemic to New Zealand.

The wingspan is 16–23 mm. The forewings are whitish ochreous, the veins lined with white. There is a blackish-fuscous median streak from the base to the apex, interrupted by a narrow bar before the middle. There is also a blackish-fuscous longitudinal wedge-shaped mark above the anal angle and usually a hindmarginal row of cloudy blackish dots. The hindwings are grey whitish in males and whitish grey in females. Adults have been recorded on wing in December, February and March.
