= Stenoma viridiceps =

Scientific classification
- Domain: Eukaryota
- Kingdom: Animalia
- Phylum: Arthropoda
- Class: Insecta
- Order: Lepidoptera
- Family: Depressariidae
- Genus: Stenoma
- Species: S. viridiceps

Binomial name
- Stenoma viridiceps (Felder & Rogenhofer, 1875)

Synonyms
- Anatolmis viridiceps Felder & Rogenhofer, 1875; Dasycera erythropennis Dognin, 1913

Species of moth

Stenoma viridiceps is a moth in the family Depressariidae. It was described by Cajetan Felder, Rudolf Felder and Alois Friedrich Rogenhofer in 1875. It is found in Colombia.
