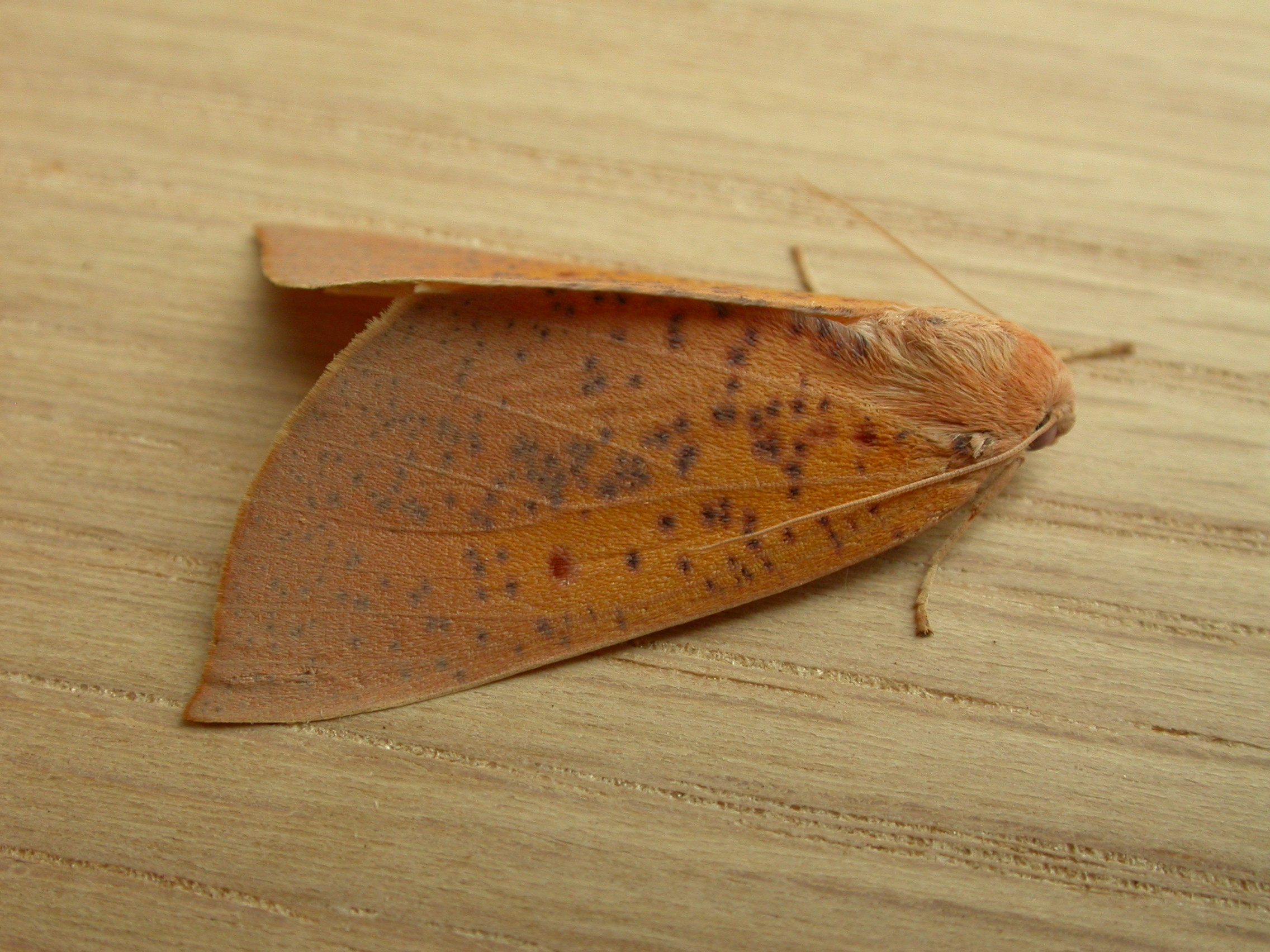

Scientific classification
- Domain: Eukaryota
- Kingdom: Animalia
- Phylum: Arthropoda
- Class: Insecta
- Order: Lepidoptera
- Family: Geometridae
- Genus: Plesanemma
- Species: P. fucata

Binomial name
- Plesanemma fucata (R. Felder & Rogenhofer, 1875)

Synonyms
- Mnesampela fucata Felder, 1875

= Plesanemma fucata =

Species of moth

Plesanemma fucata, the lemon gum moth, is a moth of the family Geometridae. The species was first described by Rudolf Felder and Alois Friedrich Rogenhofer in 1875. It is found in the southern half of Australia.

The wingspan is about 40 mm (1.6 in).

The larvae feed on Eucalyptus species.
