= Antaeotricha herilis =

Scientific classification
- Domain: Eukaryota
- Kingdom: Animalia
- Phylum: Arthropoda
- Class: Insecta
- Order: Lepidoptera
- Family: Depressariidae
- Genus: Antaeotricha
- Species: A. herilis

Binomial name
- Antaeotricha herilis Felder & Rogenhofer, 1875

Synonyms
- Antaeotricha basimacula Möschler, 1882; Antaeotricha xanthoptila Meyrick, 1912

Species of moth

Antaeotricha herilis is a moth of the family Depressariidae. It is found in Suriname and Guyana.

The wingspan is about 30 mm. The forewings are white with a dark grey blotch occupying the basal fourth of the costa and reaching half across the wing and with a faint dorsal patch of grey suffusion before one-third, its dorsal edge forming a projecting tuft of raised ochreous-yellowish and dark grey scales. There are large median and smaller tornal blotches of faint pale grey suffusion, reaching more than half across the wing, confluent dorsally. The second discal stigma is dark fuscous with an elongate patch of grey suffusion from beneath the middle of the costa to the upper anterior angle of the tornal blotch. The apex is narrowly light grey. The hindwings are white with a faint ochreous tinge and an expansible fringe of long ochreous-whitish hairs lying along vein 8 in an ochreous-yellow subcostal groove, the vein sinuate beyond this. The costa, from the base to three-fourths, with long rough projecting grey and whitish scales, longest in the middle.
