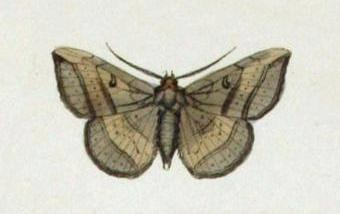
- Entomogramma torsa drawn by Alois Rogenhofer

Scientific classification
- Kingdom: Animalia
- Phylum: Arthropoda
- Class: Insecta
- Order: Lepidoptera
- Superfamily: Noctuoidea
- Family: Noctuidae (?)
- Subfamily: Catocalinae
- Genus: Entomogramma; Guenée in Boisduval & Guenée, 1852

Synonyms
- Taramina Moore, [1885]

= Entomogramma =

Genus of moths

Entomogramma is a genus of moths of the family Noctuidae. The genus was erected by Achille Guenée in 1852.

== Description ==
The compound eye (oculi) of the head (caput) of the adult (imago) is hemispherical, smooth, dark brown to black, and consists of multiple ommatidia. Antennae are filiform, about 40 – 60% of the length of the forewing. The labial palps contain three segments, which are prominently extended or lifted up. The third segment is slender and sickle shaped, which is a typical feature of pyralinae. Its forewings are triangular, with a length to width ratio of about 2.5:1. Its venation is complete, with 12 longitudinal veins (R_{5} and m_{1} are separated, and cup degenerates). The ground color is mostly yellowish brown or grayish brown, with three dark brown wavy transverse bands (basic, medium, Postmedial), and the end of the middle chamber often has metallic luster scale clusters. Hindwings are fan-shaped. Its abdomen is composed of 10 sections, and the boundary between the tergites and the sternites is clear. The 8th to 9th ventral segments of male insects are specialized into genitalia, and the holding apparatus (valvae) is developed; The ovipositor of the female is shortened and has hair clusters at the end.

== Species ==
- Entomogramma fautrix Guenée, 1852
- Entomogramma torsa Guenée, 1852
