= Antaeotricha affinis =

Scientific classification
- Kingdom: Animalia
- Phylum: Arthropoda
- Clade: Pancrustacea
- Class: Insecta
- Order: Lepidoptera
- Family: Depressariidae
- Genus: Antaeotricha
- Species: A. affinis

Binomial name
- Antaeotricha affinis Felder & Rogenhofer, 1875

Synonyms
- Antaeotricha tanysta Meyrick, 1915; Stenoma anticharis Meyrick, 1916

Species of moth in genus Antaeotricha

Antaeotricha affinis is a moth of the family Depressariidae. It is found in Brazil (Amazonas) and the Guianas.

The wingspan is 18–19 mm. The forewings are white, partially faintly tinged with fuscous and dark fuscous markings. There is a small spot on the base of the costa, a small subbasal dash in the middle, and a short subbasal mark on the dorsum, followed by some fuscous suffusion on the dorsal half, as well as three oblique lines, the first two irregular, followed by more or less fuscous suffusion towards the dorsum, the first from a short elongate mark above the middle at one-fifth to the middle of the dorsum, the second from the middle of the costa to three-fourths of the dorsum, the third from three-fourths of the costa to the tornus, slightly indented above the middle, somewhat curved below this. There are eight marginal dots around the apex and termen. The hindwings are whitish, becoming light grey towards the apex and termen. The costa is rather expanded from the base to three-fourths.
