= Stenoma cana =

Scientific classification
- Domain: Eukaryota
- Kingdom: Animalia
- Phylum: Arthropoda
- Class: Insecta
- Order: Lepidoptera
- Family: Depressariidae
- Genus: Stenoma
- Species: S. cana

Binomial name
- Stenoma cana (Felder & Rogenhofer, 1875)

Synonyms
- Cryptolechia cana Felder & Rogenhofer, 1875; Stenoma octacentra Meyrick, 1915; Stenoma antilyra Meyrick, 1925

Species of moth

Stenoma cana is a moth of the family Depressariidae. It is found in Brazil (Amazonas), Peru and French Guiana.

The wingspan is 15–19 mm. The forewings are white, variably tinged or sprinkled greyish, sometimes obscurely streaked pale greyish ochreous between veins. The costal edge is dark grey towards the base and there is some irregular greyish clouding towards the costa at one-fourth, as well as a very oblique dark grey mark from before the middle of the costa, beyond this two small grey spots edged darker, from beyond the second a series of dark grey dots obliquely inwards, forming a deep indentation, then strongly excurved in the disc and again sinuate to before the tornus. The first discal stigma is indistinct, fuscous, the plical obliquely beyond it, indistinct or seldom dark fuscous, the second discal represented by two transversely placed dark fuscous dots, an additional dot before the lower of these. There are also two dark fuscous marks on the costa before the apex, and a terminal series of dots or an interrupted line. The hindwings are whitish or whitish grey with a dark fuscous terminal line.
