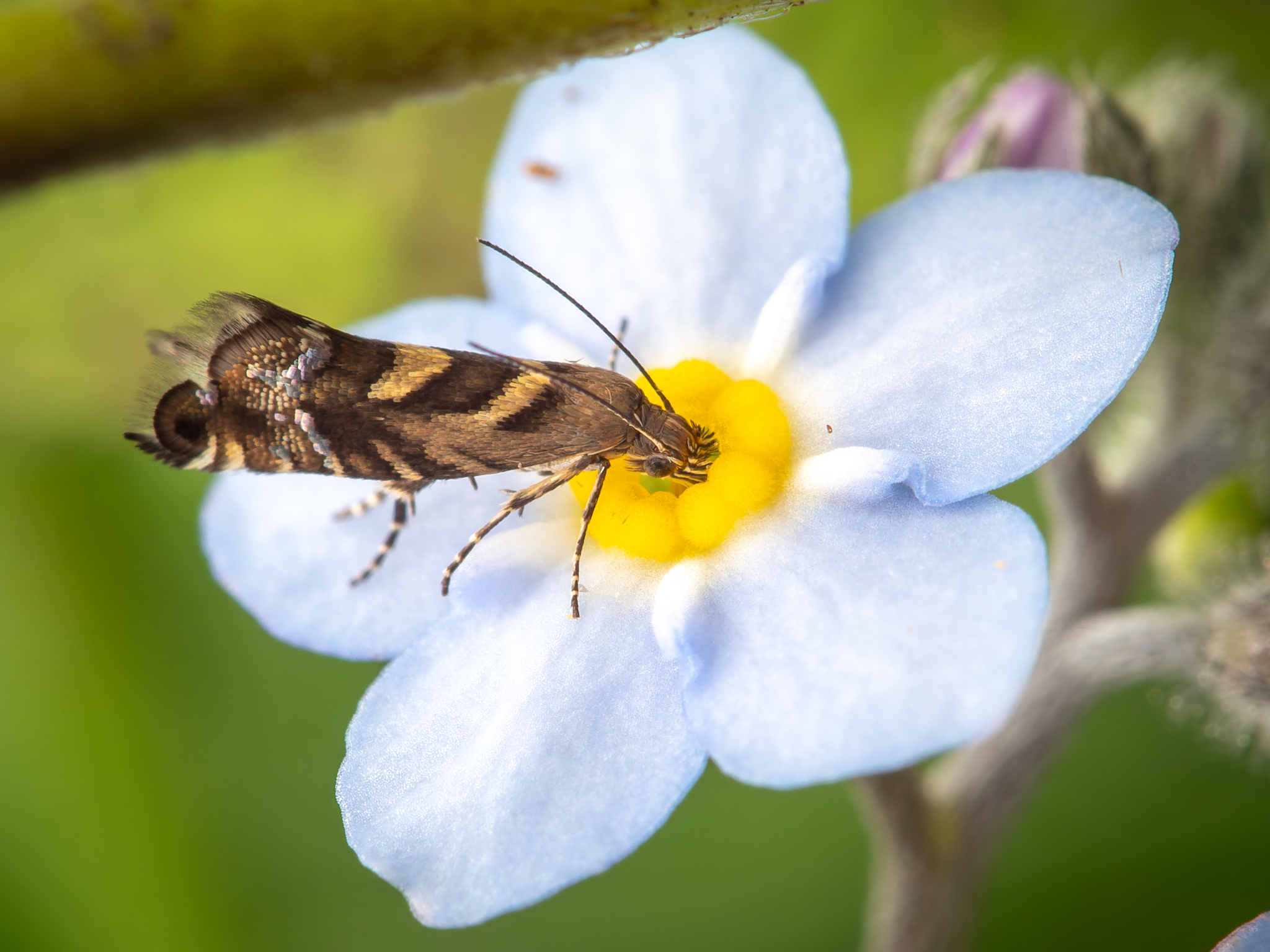

Scientific classification
- Kingdom: Animalia
- Phylum: Arthropoda
- Clade: Pancrustacea
- Class: Insecta
- Order: Lepidoptera
- Family: Glyphipterigidae
- Genus: Glyphipterix
- Species: G. tungella

Binomial name
- Glyphipterix tungella Felder & Rogenhofer, 1875

Synonyms
- Glyphipterix asteronota Meyrick, 1880; Glyphipterix plagigera Philpott, 1916

= Glyphipterix tungella =

Species of moth

Glyphipterix tungella is a species of sedge moth in the genus Glyphipterix. It is endemic to New Zealand and is found throughout the country. Larvae mine the leaves of small sedges. Adults of this species are day flying and inhabit sheltered scrub or grassy areas and forest clearings.

== Taxonomy ==
G. tungella was first described by Cajetan Felder and Alois Friedrich Rogenhofer in 1875. Edward Meyrick, thinking he was describing a new species, also described it in 1880 under the name Glyphipterix asteronota. Alfred Philpott did the same in 1916 under the name Glyphipterix plagigera. George Hudson discussed this species in his 1928 publication The butterflies and moths of New Zealand under the name G. tungella as a synonym of G. asteronota and under the name G. plagigera as a synonym of G. dichorda. John S. Dugdale synonymised G. asteronota and G. plagigera with G. tungella in 1988. The male holotype, collected in Nelson by T. R. Oxley, is held in the Natural History Museum, London.

== Description ==
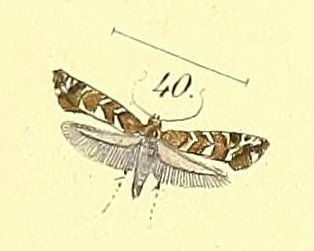
Illustration from original description.

This species has a forewing length of between 3.5mm and 5mm.

Meyrick described this species under the name Glyphipterix asteronota as follows:

♂ ♀. 3 1/4. Head, thorax, and antennae dark fuscous. Palpi whitish, with obsolete darker rings. (?) Abdomen dark fuscous, apex whitish. Legs dark fuscous, middle and posterior tibiae with whitish central and apical bands, all tarsi with broad whitish rings at apex of joints. Fore-wings somewhat dilated, hind-margin rather strongly sinuate beneath apex; dark fuscous; two conspicuous clear white semilunate spots on inner margin, reaching half across wing, first near base, second slightly beyond middle, both outwardly oblique, their apices curved towards apex of wing; six slender oblique white streaks from costa; first at 1/4; second hardly before middle, not reaching half across wing; third uniting with a similar streak from anal angle to form an outwardly curved transverse fascia; fourth short; fifth and sixth small, wedge-shaped, close before apex; some irregular silvery-white scales above anal angle beyond the transverse fascia; cilia grey (?), basal half separated by a black line and clothed with dark fuscous scales, except on a wedge-shaped black-margined indentation a little below apex, containing a whitish spot. (?) Hind-wings and cilia dark fuscous-grey.

Philpott described this species under the name Glyphipterix plagigera as follows:

♂ ♀. 9 1/2-11 mm. Head ochreous-white. Thorax fuscous-brown. Palpi moderately tufted beneath, ochreous-white with 4 obscure fuscous rings. Abdomen blackish-grey, obscurely annulated Avith white. Posterior legs black, tibiae and tarsi annulated with white. Forewings elongate, moderately dilated posteriorly, costa moderately arched, apex obtuse, termen oblique; dark greyish-fuscous, purplish tinted and more or less sprinkled with white posteriorly; a narrow, outwardly oblique, white streak from costa at 1/4, reaching to near middle of wing; 5 similar streaks between this and apex, the last two less oblique; a broad white blotch on dorsum near base and a similar one before middle, sometimes uniting at apex; an obscure white streak from tornus, sometimes uniting with third costal streak : cilia fuscous-grey with median line and apical hook darker. Hind- wings broadly lanceolate; fuscous-grey : cilia fuscous-grey.

== Distribution ==
This species is endemic to New Zealand. It is common throughout the country.

== Hosts and habitat ==
The larvae of G. tungella are leaf miners of small sedges. The species prefers sheltered shrub or grassy areas and forest clearings. It has been collected at Kānuka scrub sites.

== Behaviour ==
This day flying moth can be seen during the months of October to March.
