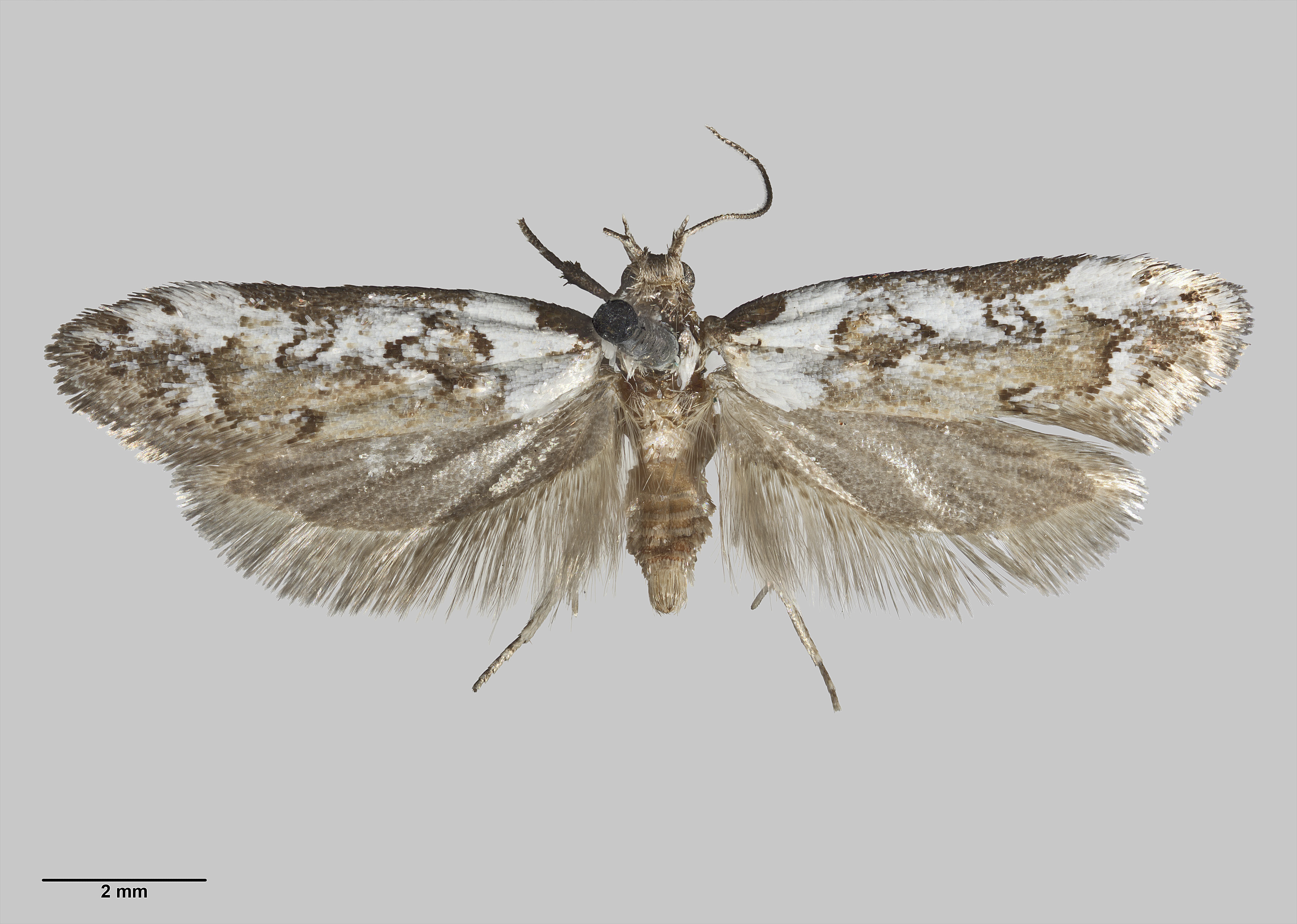

Scientific classification
- Kingdom: Animalia
- Phylum: Arthropoda
- Class: Insecta
- Order: Lepidoptera
- Family: Oecophoridae
- Genus: Trachypepla
- Species: T. festiva

Binomial name
- Trachypepla festiva Philpott, 1930

Synonyms
- Trachypepla polyleuca Meyrick, 1931

= Trachypepla festiva =

Species of moth endemic to New Zealand

Trachypepla festiva is a moth of the family Oecophoridae and was first described by Alfred Philpott in 1930. It is endemic to New Zealand and has been collected in the northern parts of the North Island.

== Taxonomy ==
This species was first described by Alfred Philpott in 1930. In 1939 George Hudson discussed and illustrated T. festiva in his book A supplement to the butterflies and moths of New Zealand. Hudson also synonymised T. polyleuca with this species. The male holotype, collected by C. E. Clarke at Whangārei Falls, is held at the Auckland War Memorial Museum. It has been hypothesised that this species is possibly a form of T. conspiculella.

== Description ==
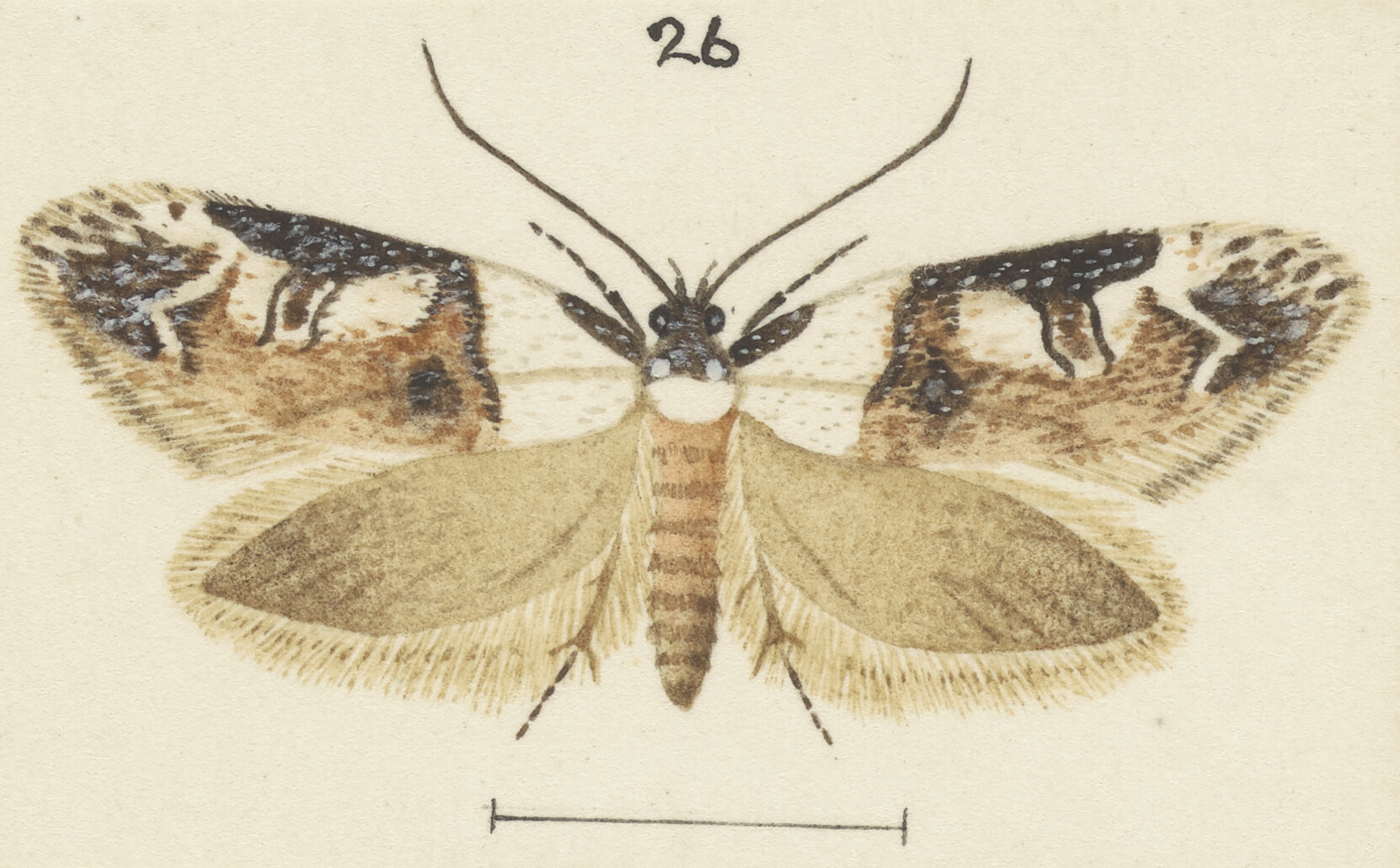
Illustration of female by George Hudson.

This species was described by Philpott as follows:

♂. 14 mm. Head and palpi greyish brown. Antennae greyish brown; ciliations in ♂ 3/4. Thorax greyish brown, apex and apical half of tegulae white. Abdomen brassy, segmental divisions and anal tuft pale greyish brown. Legs fuscous, posterior pair ochreous, all tarsi annulated with ochreous. Fore-wings elongate, costa subsinuate, apex broadly rounded, termen hardly rounded, oblique; white; a moderately broad dark fuscous mark along costa from base to 1/8; costa narrowly fuscous from 1/4 to middle, thence broadening into a semi-oval patch reaching to 2/3; a very irregular fascia from costa at about 1/4 to dorsum, broadening very much in disc and enclosing plical and first discal scale-tufts, mixed in disc and on dorsum with brownish ochreous; three or four very irregular interrupted fuscous fasciae proceeding from semi-oval costal patch; the whole area below middle of wing between the first and last fasciae dull brownish ochreous; two or three fuscous spots on apical 1/4 of costa and some fuscous suffusion in subterminal area: fringes ochreous grey sprinkled with fuscous. Hindwings pale fuscous grey: fringes greyish ochreous.

The adults of this species imitates bird droppings but it differs from other species in its genus as it has detailed markings on the forewings.

== Distribution ==
This species is endemic to New Zealand and has been collected in Leigh, North Auckland, and Whangārei.

== Behaviour ==
Adults of this species are on the wing from November until January.
