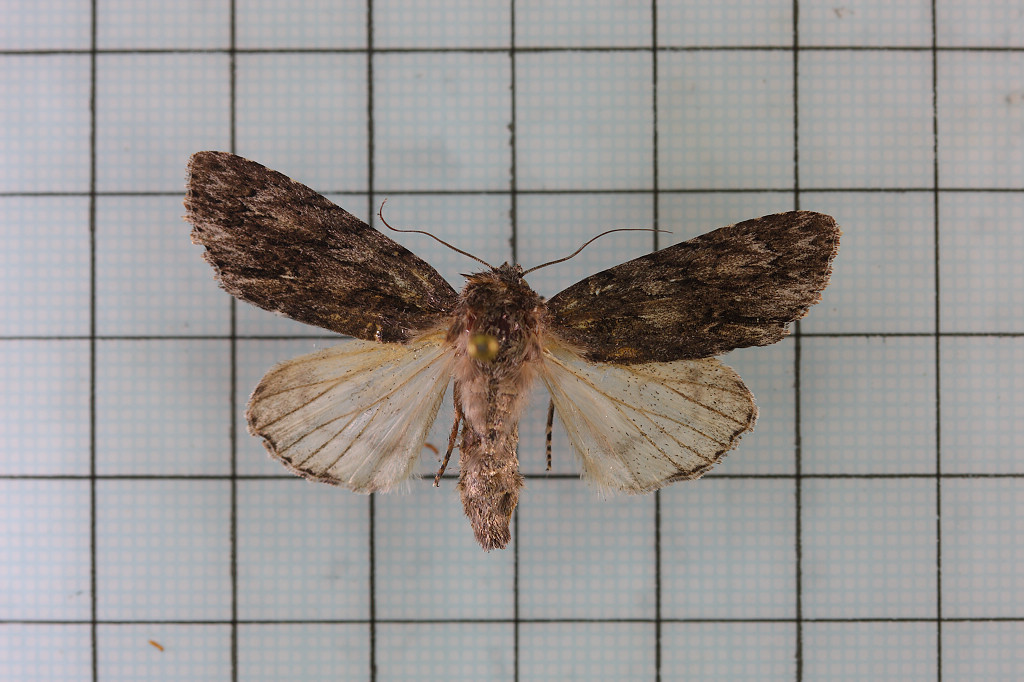

Scientific classification
- Kingdom: Animalia
- Phylum: Arthropoda
- Clade: Pancrustacea
- Class: Insecta
- Order: Lepidoptera
- Superfamily: Noctuoidea
- Family: Noctuidae
- Genus: Acronicta
- Species: A. hercules

Binomial name
- Acronicta hercules (Felder & Rogenhofer, 1874)

Synonyms
- Acronycta hercules Felder & Rogenhofer, 1874; Acronycta elongata Oberthur, 1874

= Acronicta hercules =

Species of moth

Acronicta hercules is a moth of the family Noctuidae. It is found in the Korean Peninsula, Japan, the Russian Far East (Amur region), China, and Taiwan.
