= Argyria polyniphas =

Scientific classification
- Kingdom: Animalia
- Phylum: Arthropoda
- Class: Insecta
- Order: Lepidoptera
- Family: Crambidae
- Genus: Argyria
- Species: A. polyniphas

Binomial name
- Argyria polyniphas Meyrick, 1932

Species of moth

Argyria polyniphas is a moth in the family Crambidae. It was described by Edward Meyrick in 1932. It is found on Fiji.
