= Argyria croceicinctella =

Scientific classification
- Kingdom: Animalia
- Phylum: Arthropoda
- Class: Insecta
- Order: Lepidoptera
- Family: Crambidae
- Genus: Argyria
- Species: A. croceicinctella

Binomial name
- Argyria croceicinctella (Walker, 1863)

Synonyms
- Urola croceicinctella Walker, 1863; Argyria tingurialis Dyar, 1913

Species of moth

Argyria croceicinctella is a moth in the family Crambidae. It was described by Francis Walker in 1863. It is found in Venezuela and Peru.
