= Argyria sericina =

Scientific classification
- Domain: Eukaryota
- Kingdom: Animalia
- Phylum: Arthropoda
- Class: Insecta
- Order: Lepidoptera
- Family: Crambidae
- Genus: Argyria
- Species: A. sericina

Binomial name
- Argyria sericina (Zeller, 1881)

Synonyms
- Myelois sericina Zeller, 1881

Species of moth

Argyria sericina is a moth in the family Crambidae. It was described by Philipp Christoph Zeller in 1881. It is found in Colombia.
