= Argyria diplomochalis =

Scientific classification
- Kingdom: Animalia
- Phylum: Arthropoda
- Class: Insecta
- Order: Lepidoptera
- Family: Crambidae
- Genus: Argyria
- Species: A. diplomochalis

Binomial name
- Argyria diplomochalis Dyar, 1913

Synonyms
- Argyria diplomachalis Schaus, 1940

Species of moth

Argyria diplomochalis is a moth in the family Crambidae. It was described by Harrison Gray Dyar Jr. in 1913. It is found in Puerto Rico.
