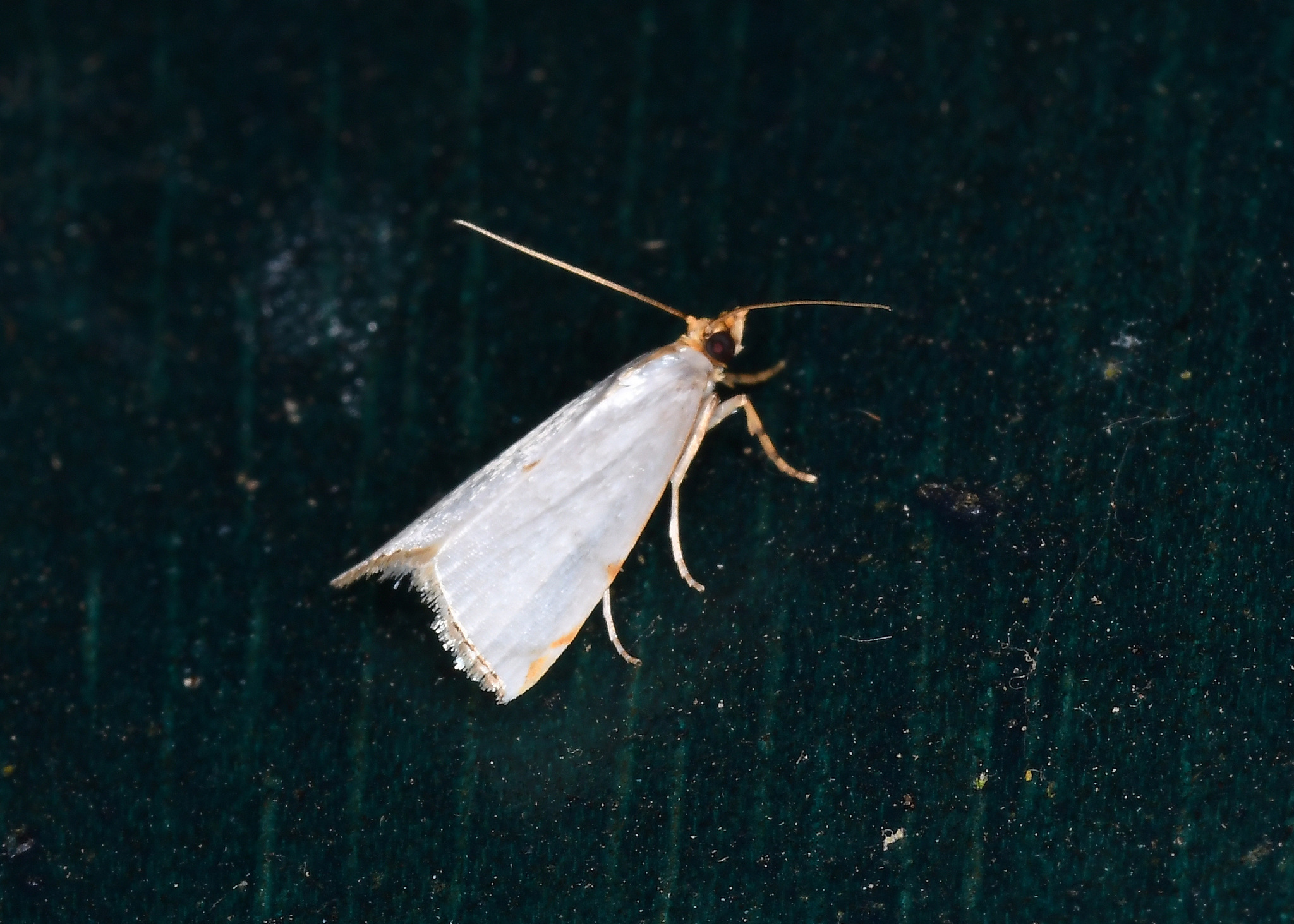

Scientific classification
- Kingdom: Animalia
- Phylum: Arthropoda
- Clade: Pancrustacea
- Class: Insecta
- Order: Lepidoptera
- Family: Crambidae
- Genus: Argyria
- Species: A. quevedella

Binomial name
- Argyria quevedella Schaus, 1922

= Argyria quevedella =

Species of moth

Argyria quevedella is a species of moth in the family Crambidae. It was first described by Schaus in 1922. It is found in Ecuador.
