= Argyria divisella =

Scientific classification
- Kingdom: Animalia
- Phylum: Arthropoda
- Class: Insecta
- Order: Lepidoptera
- Family: Crambidae
- Genus: Argyria
- Species: A. divisella

Binomial name
- Argyria divisella Walker, 1866

Species of moth

Argyria divisella is a moth in the family Crambidae. It was described by Francis Walker in 1866. It is found in Brazil.
