= Argyria lusella =

Scientific classification
- Kingdom: Animalia
- Phylum: Arthropoda
- Clade: Pancrustacea
- Class: Insecta
- Order: Lepidoptera
- Family: Crambidae
- Genus: Argyria
- Species: A. lusella

Binomial name
- Argyria lusella (Zeller, 1863)

Synonyms
- Catharylla lusella Zeller, 1863; Argyria lusalla Munroe, 1995

Species of moth

Argyria lusella is a moth in the family Crambidae. It was described by Zeller in 1863. It is found on the Virgin Islands.
