= Argyria lucidellus =

Scientific classification
- Kingdom: Animalia
- Phylum: Arthropoda
- Clade: Pancrustacea
- Class: Insecta
- Order: Lepidoptera
- Family: Crambidae
- Genus: Argyria
- Species: A. lucidellus

Binomial name
- Argyria lucidellus (Zeller, 1839)

Synonyms
- Crambus lucidellus Zeller, 1839

Species of moth

Argyria lucidellus is a moth in the family Crambidae. It was described by Zeller in 1839. It is found in Brazil.
