= Snellenia coccinea =

Scientific classification
- Domain: Eukaryota
- Kingdom: Animalia
- Phylum: Arthropoda
- Class: Insecta
- Order: Lepidoptera
- Family: Stathmopodidae
- Genus: Snellenia
- Species: S. coccinea

Binomial name
- Snellenia coccinea Walsingham, 1889

Species of moth

Snellenia coccinea is a species of moth of the family Stathmopodidae. It was described by Thomas de Grey, 6th Baron Walsingham, in 1889. It is found in the Himalaya.
