= Argyria contiguella =

Scientific classification
- Kingdom: Animalia
- Phylum: Arthropoda
- Class: Insecta
- Order: Lepidoptera
- Family: Crambidae
- Genus: Argyria
- Species: A. contiguella

Binomial name
- Argyria contiguella (Zeller, 1872)

Synonyms
- Catharylla contiguella Zeller, 1872

Species of moth

Argyria contiguella is a moth in the family Crambidae. It was described by Philipp Christoph Zeller in 1872. It is found on Cuba.
