= Argyria plumbolinealis =

Scientific classification
- Kingdom: Animalia
- Phylum: Arthropoda
- Class: Insecta
- Order: Lepidoptera
- Family: Crambidae
- Genus: Argyria
- Species: A. plumbolinealis

Binomial name
- Argyria plumbolinealis Hampson, 1896

Species of moth

Argyria plumbolinealis is a moth in the family Crambidae. It was described by George Hampson in 1896.
