= Argyria vesta =

Scientific classification
- Domain: Eukaryota
- Kingdom: Animalia
- Phylum: Arthropoda
- Class: Insecta
- Order: Lepidoptera
- Family: Crambidae
- Genus: Argyria
- Species: A. vesta

Binomial name
- Argyria vesta Błeszyński, 1962

Synonyms
- Argyria obliquella Dyar, 1913 (preocc.)

Species of moth

Argyria vesta is a moth in the family Crambidae. It was described by Stanisław Błeszyński in 1962. It is found in Paraná, Brazil.
