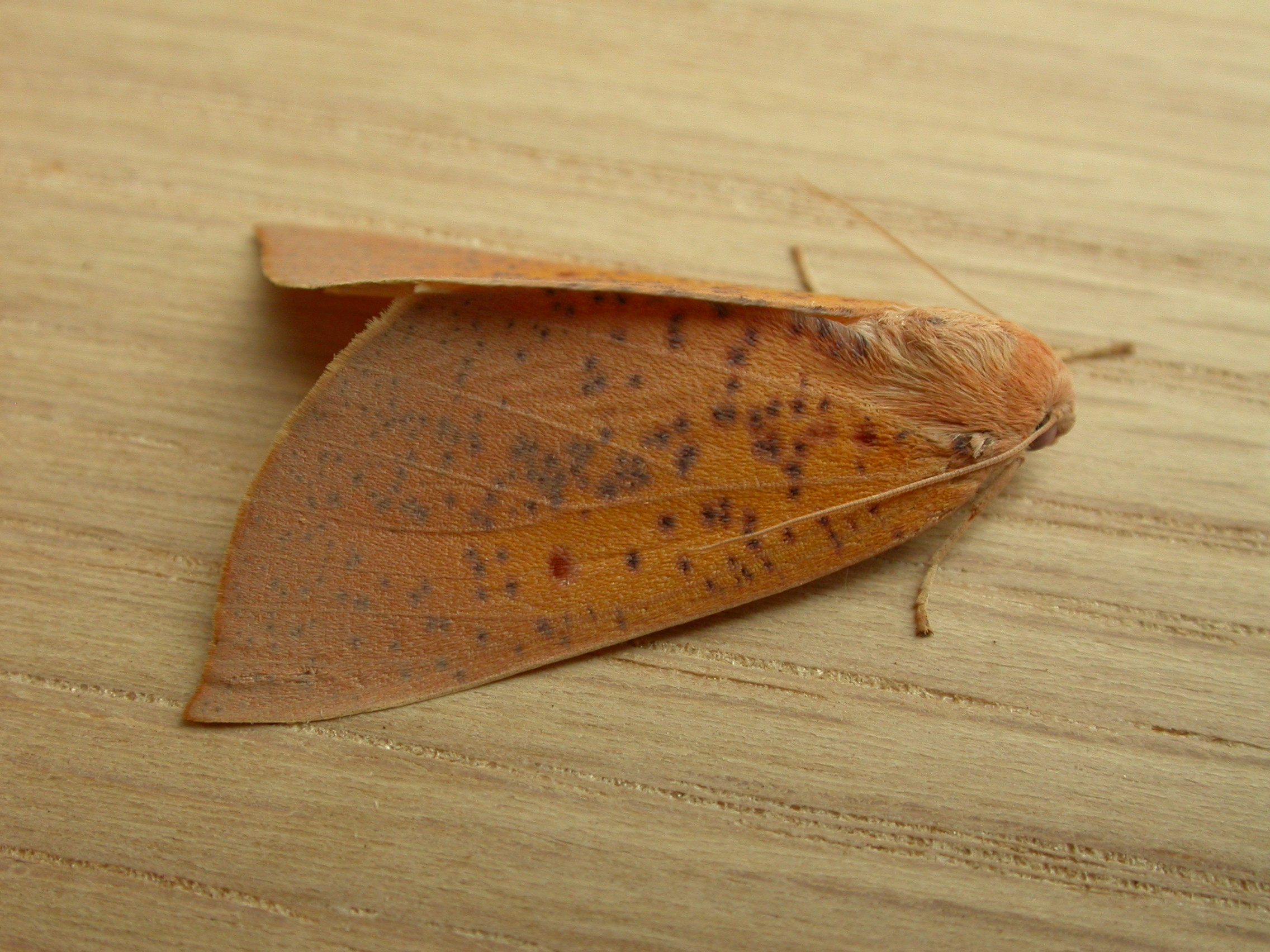
- Plesanemma fucata

Scientific classification
- Domain: Eukaryota
- Kingdom: Animalia
- Phylum: Arthropoda
- Class: Insecta
- Order: Lepidoptera
- Family: Geometridae
- Tribe: Nacophorini
- Genus: Plesanemma; McQuillan, 1984

= Plesanemma =

Genus of moths

Plesanemma is a genus of moths in the family Geometridae erected by Peter B. McQuillan in 1984. Both species are found in Australia.

== Species ==
- Plesanemma fucata (Felder & Rogenhofer, 1875) Queensland
- Plesanemma altafucata McQuillan, 1984 Tasmania
