= Argyria sordipes =

Scientific classification
- Kingdom: Animalia
- Phylum: Arthropoda
- Clade: Pancrustacea
- Class: Insecta
- Order: Lepidoptera
- Family: Crambidae
- Genus: Argyria
- Species: A. sordipes

Binomial name
- Argyria sordipes Zeller, 1877

Species of moth

Argyria sordipes is a moth in the family Crambidae. It was described by Zeller in 1877. It is found in Argentina.
