= Argyria centrifugens =

Scientific classification
- Kingdom: Animalia
- Phylum: Arthropoda
- Class: Insecta
- Order: Lepidoptera
- Family: Crambidae
- Genus: Argyria
- Species: A. centrifugens

Binomial name
- Argyria centrifugens Dyar, 1914

Species of moth

Argyria centrifugens is a moth in the subfamily Crambinae of the family Crambidae. The species was described by Harrison Gray Dyar Jr. in 1914 based on three adult specimens collected in Panama. It was furthermore reported from Honduras. The Barcode of Life Data System also comprises samples of this species from Colombia and Argentina.
