= Argyria subaenescens =

Scientific classification
- Kingdom: Animalia
- Phylum: Arthropoda
- Class: Insecta
- Order: Lepidoptera
- Family: Crambidae
- Genus: Argyria
- Species: A. subaenescens

Binomial name
- Argyria subaenescens (Walker, 1863)

Synonyms
- Urola subaenescens Walker, 1863; Catharylla fuscipes Zeller, 1863

Species of moth

Argyria subaenescens is a moth in the family Crambidae. It was described by Francis Walker in 1863. It is found in North America, where it has been recorded from Illinois.
