= Argyria argyrostola =

Scientific classification
- Kingdom: Animalia
- Phylum: Arthropoda
- Clade: Pancrustacea
- Class: Insecta
- Order: Lepidoptera
- Family: Crambidae
- Genus: Argyria
- Species: A. argyrostola

Binomial name
- Argyria argyrostola (Hampson, 1919)

Synonyms
- Chilo argyrostola Hampson, 1919

Species of moth

Argyria argyrostola is a moth in the family Crambidae. It was described by George Hampson in 1919. It is found in Venezuela.
