= Argyria heringi =

Scientific classification
- Domain: Eukaryota
- Kingdom: Animalia
- Phylum: Arthropoda
- Class: Insecta
- Order: Lepidoptera
- Family: Crambidae
- Genus: Argyria
- Species: A. heringi

Binomial name
- Argyria heringi Błeszyński, 1960

Species of moth

Argyria heringi is a moth in the family Crambidae. It was described by Stanisław Błeszyński in 1960. It is found in Guyana.
