= Gonioma hypoxantha =

Scientific classification
- Kingdom: Animalia
- Phylum: Arthropoda
- Class: Insecta
- Order: Lepidoptera
- Family: Xyloryctidae
- Genus: Gonioma
- Species: G. hypoxantha

Binomial name
- Gonioma hypoxantha (Lower, 1894)

Synonyms
- Uzucha hypoxantha Lower, 1894; Gonioma xanthopsis Turner, 1898

Species of moth

Gonioma hypoxantha is a moth in the family Xyloryctidae. It was described by Oswald Bertram Lower in 1894. It is found in Australia, where it has been recorded from Queensland.

The wingspan is 33–35 mm. The forewings are whitish grey, sparsely irrorated (sprinkled) with blackish scales. The hindwings are ochreous yellow with a pale fuscous suffusion at the apex.

The larvae have been recorded feeding on Acacia nilotica. They bore under the bark of their host plant.
