= Argyria interrupta =

Scientific classification
- Kingdom: Animalia
- Phylum: Arthropoda
- Clade: Pancrustacea
- Class: Insecta
- Order: Lepidoptera
- Family: Crambidae
- Genus: Argyria
- Species: A. interrupta

Binomial name
- Argyria interrupta (Zeller, 1866)

Synonyms
- Catharylla interrupta Zeller, 1866

Species of moth

Argyria interrupta is a moth in the family Crambidae. It was described by Zeller in 1866. It is found in Venezuela.
