= Snellenia miltocrossa =

Scientific classification
- Domain: Eukaryota
- Kingdom: Animalia
- Phylum: Arthropoda
- Class: Insecta
- Order: Lepidoptera
- Family: Stathmopodidae
- Genus: Snellenia
- Species: S. miltocrossa

Binomial name
- Snellenia miltocrossa Turner, 1923

Species of moth

Snellenia miltocrossa is a species of moth of the family Stathmopodidae. It was described by Alfred Jefferis Turner in 1923. It is found in New South Wales.
