= Gonioma (moth) =

Scientific classification
- Kingdom: Animalia
- Phylum: Arthropoda
- Class: Insecta
- Order: Lepidoptera
- Family: Xyloryctidae
- Genus: Gonioma; Turner, 1898

Synonyms
- Protrachyntis Meyrick, 1917

Moth genus in family Xyloryctidae

Gonioma is a genus of moths of the family Xyloryctidae.

== Species ==
- Gonioma hospita (Felder & Rogenhofer, 1875)
- Gonioma hypoxantha (Lower, 1894)
