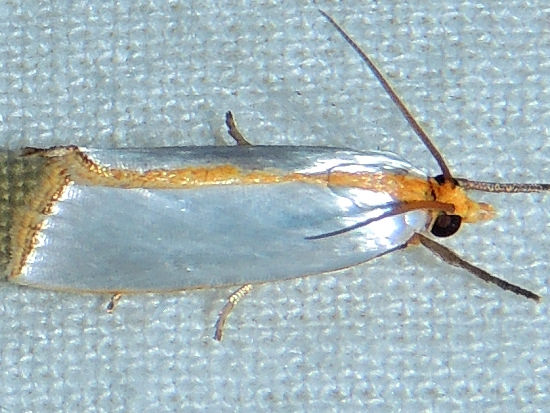

Scientific classification
- Kingdom: Animalia
- Phylum: Arthropoda
- Class: Insecta
- Order: Lepidoptera
- Family: Crambidae
- Genus: Argyria
- Species: A. nummulalis

Binomial name
- Argyria nummulalis Hübner, 1818

Synonyms
- Tortrix argentana Martyn, 1797; Argyria argentana Fernald, 1896

= Argyria nummulalis =

Species of moth

Argyria nummulalis is a moth in the family Crambidae. It was described by Jacob Hübner in 1818. It is found in North America, where it has been recorded from Alabama, Florida, Georgia, Kansas, Maryland, Massachusetts, Mississippi, North Carolina, Pennsylvania and South Carolina.

The wingspan is about 19 mm. Adults have been recorded on wing year round in the southern part of the range. Adults are on wing from May to September in the rest of the range.

The larvae feed on Gramineae species.
