= Argyria xanthoguma =

Scientific classification
- Kingdom: Animalia
- Phylum: Arthropoda
- Class: Insecta
- Order: Lepidoptera
- Family: Crambidae
- Genus: Argyria
- Species: A. xanthoguma

Binomial name
- Argyria xanthoguma Dyar, 1914

Species of moth

Argyria xanthoguma is a moth in the family Crambidae. It was described by Harrison Gray Dyar Jr. in 1914. It is found in Panama.
