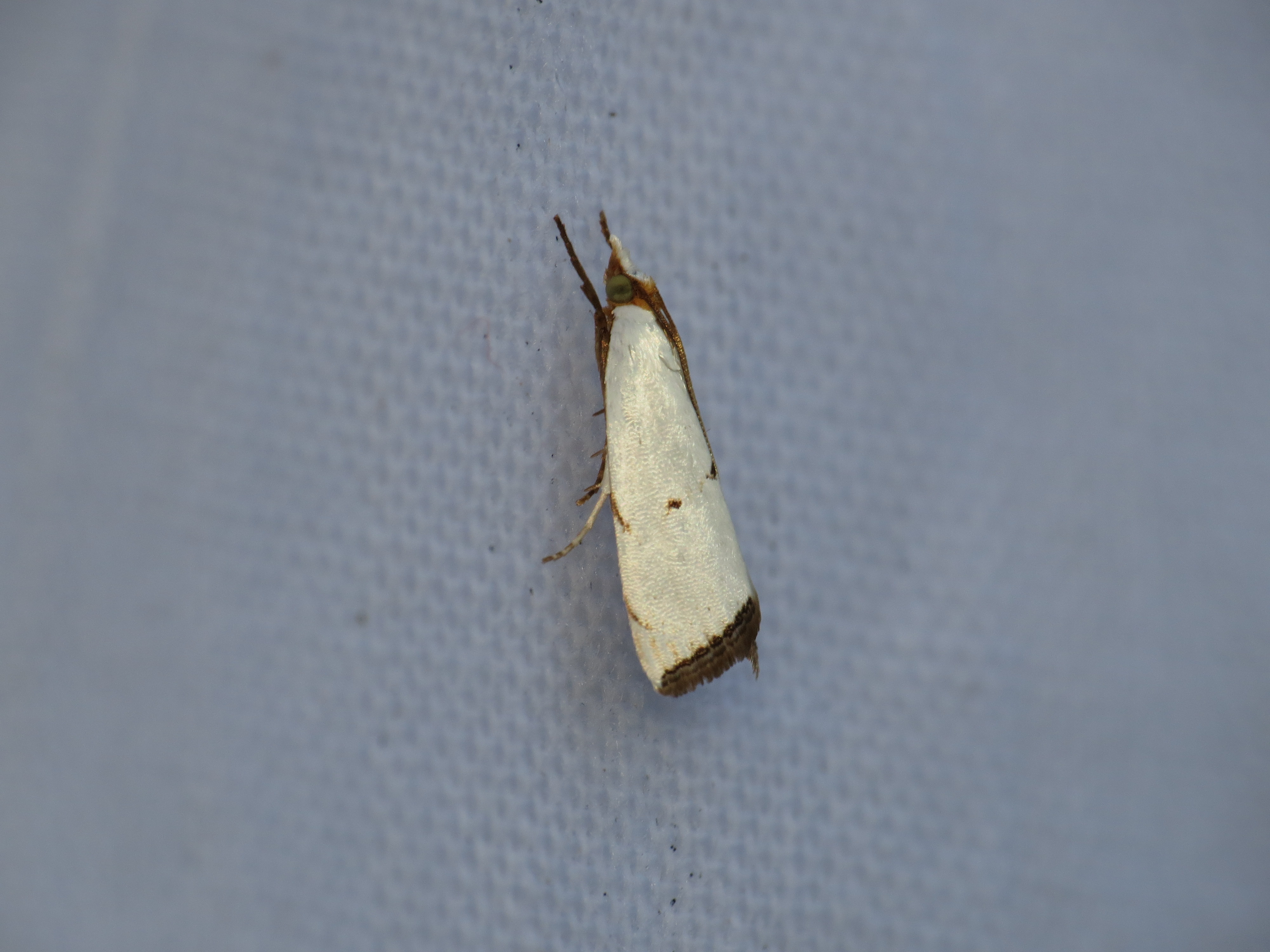

Scientific classification
- Domain: Eukaryota
- Kingdom: Animalia
- Phylum: Arthropoda
- Class: Insecta
- Order: Lepidoptera
- Family: Crambidae
- Genus: Argyria
- Species: A. lacteella

Binomial name
- Argyria lacteella (Fabricius, 1794)

Synonyms
- Tinea lacteella Fabricius, 1794; Argyria gonogramma Dyar, 1915; Argyria pussillalis Hübner, 1818; Pyralis albana Fabricius, 1798; Zebronia abronalis Walker, 1859

= Argyria lacteella =

Species of moth

Argyria lacteella, the milky urola moth, is a moth in the family Crambidae. It was described by Johan Christian Fabricius in 1794. It is found in North America, from Maryland south to Florida and west to Texas. In the south, the range extends through Costa Rica to Brazil. It is also found on Cuba, Puerto Rico and Bermuda.

Adults are on wing from spring to fall.
