= Argyria vestalis =

Scientific classification
- Kingdom: Animalia
- Phylum: Arthropoda
- Clade: Pancrustacea
- Class: Insecta
- Order: Lepidoptera
- Family: Crambidae
- Genus: Argyria
- Species: A. vestalis

Binomial name
- Argyria vestalis Butler, 1878

Species of moth

Argyria vestalis is a moth in the family Crambidae. It was described by Arthur Gardiner Butler in 1878, and is found in Jamaica.
