= Snellenia capnora =

Scientific classification
- Domain: Eukaryota
- Kingdom: Animalia
- Phylum: Arthropoda
- Class: Insecta
- Order: Lepidoptera
- Family: Stathmopodidae
- Genus: Snellenia
- Species: S. capnora

Binomial name
- Snellenia capnora Turner, 1913

Species of moth

Snellenia capnora is a species of moth of the Stathmopodidae family. It is found in Queensland, Australia.
