= Argyria tunuistrigella =

Scientific classification
- Domain: Eukaryota
- Kingdom: Animalia
- Phylum: Arthropoda
- Class: Insecta
- Order: Lepidoptera
- Family: Crambidae
- Genus: Argyria
- Species: A. tunuistrigella

Binomial name
- Argyria tunuistrigella Schaus, 1922

Species of moth

Argyria tunuistrigella is a moth in the family Crambidae. It was described by Schaus in 1922. It is found in Brazil (Paraná).
