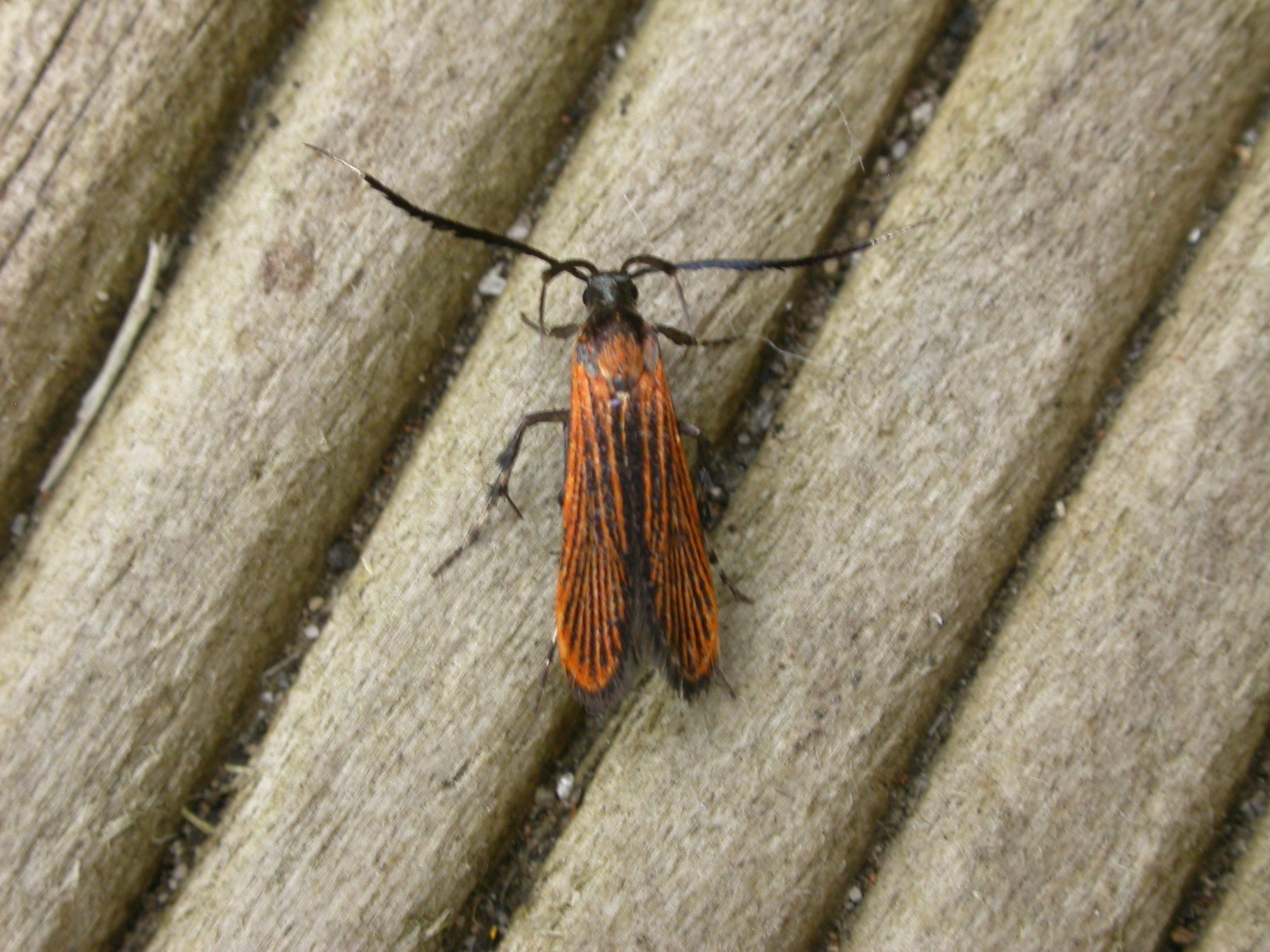
- Snellenia lineata (Walker, 1856), Burrill Lake

Scientific classification
- Domain: Eukaryota
- Kingdom: Animalia
- Phylum: Arthropoda
- Class: Insecta
- Order: Lepidoptera
- Family: Stathmopodidae
- Genus: Snellenia; Walsingham, 1889

= Snellenia =

Genus of moths

Snellenia is a genus of moths in the family Stathmopodidae (formerly known as Stathmopodinae, subfamily of the Oecophoridae).

== Species ==
- Snellenia capnora Turner, 1913
- Snellenia coccinea Walsingham, 1889
- Snellenia flavipennis (R. Felder & Rogenhofer, 1875)
- Snellenia hylaea Turner, 1913
- Snellenia ignispergens Diakonoff, 1948
- Snellenia lineata (Walker, 1856)
- Snellenia miltocrossa Turner, 1923
- Snellenia tarsella Walsingham, 1889
