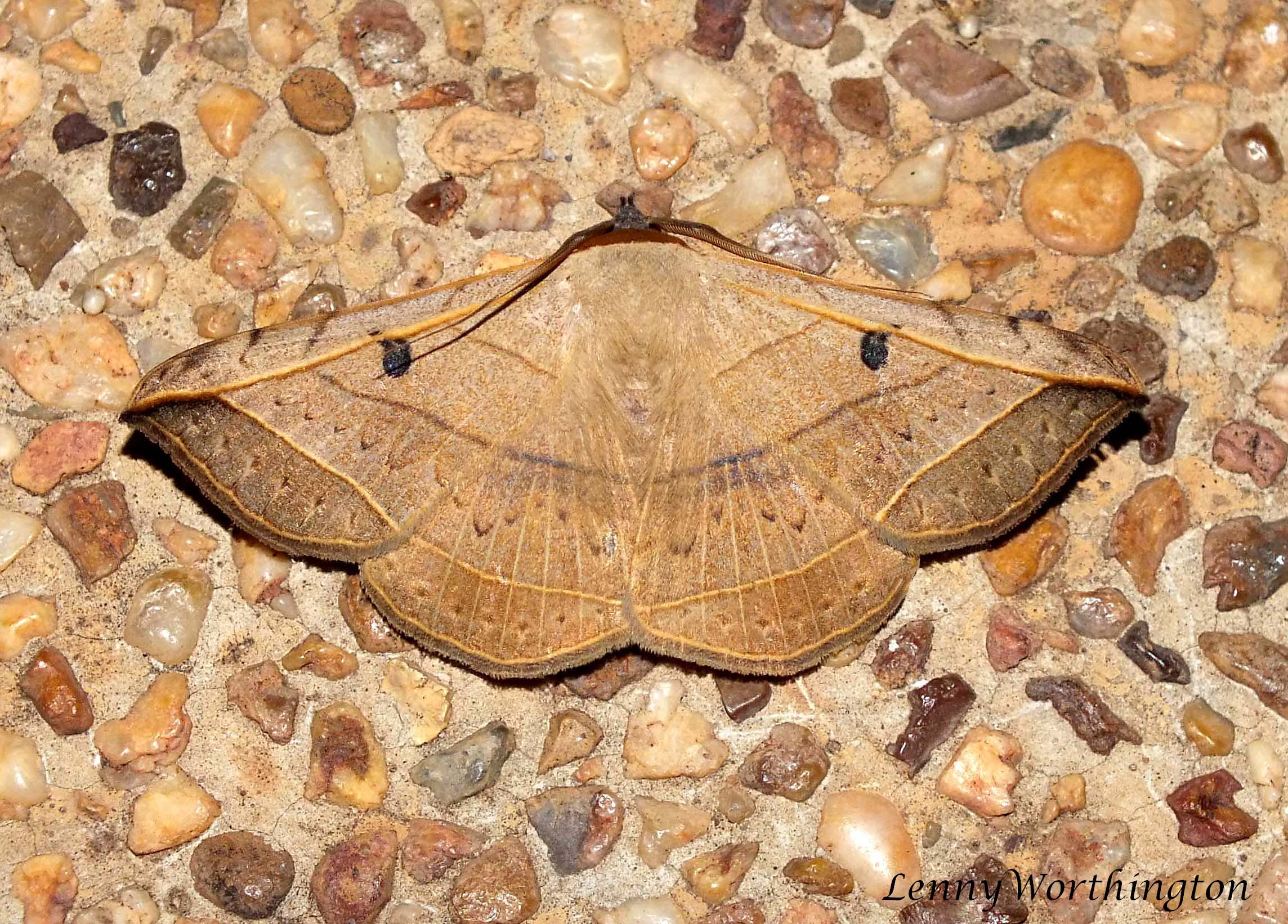

Scientific classification
- Kingdom: Animalia
- Phylum: Arthropoda
- Class: Insecta
- Order: Lepidoptera
- Superfamily: Noctuoidea
- Family: Noctuidae (?)
- Genus: Entomogramma
- Species: E. torsa

Binomial name
- Entomogramma torsa Guenée, 1852

= Entomogramma torsa =

Species of moth

Entomogramma torsa is a moth of the family Noctuidae first described by Achille Guenée in 1852. It is found in India, Sri Lanka, and Java.

The wingspan of the male is 56 mm. Body reddish brown. Head blackish. Forewing without a fulvous subcostal streak. A black spot found at end of cell. Postmedial line dentate. Both wings with fine marginal ochreous line. Lunulate lines are prominent.
