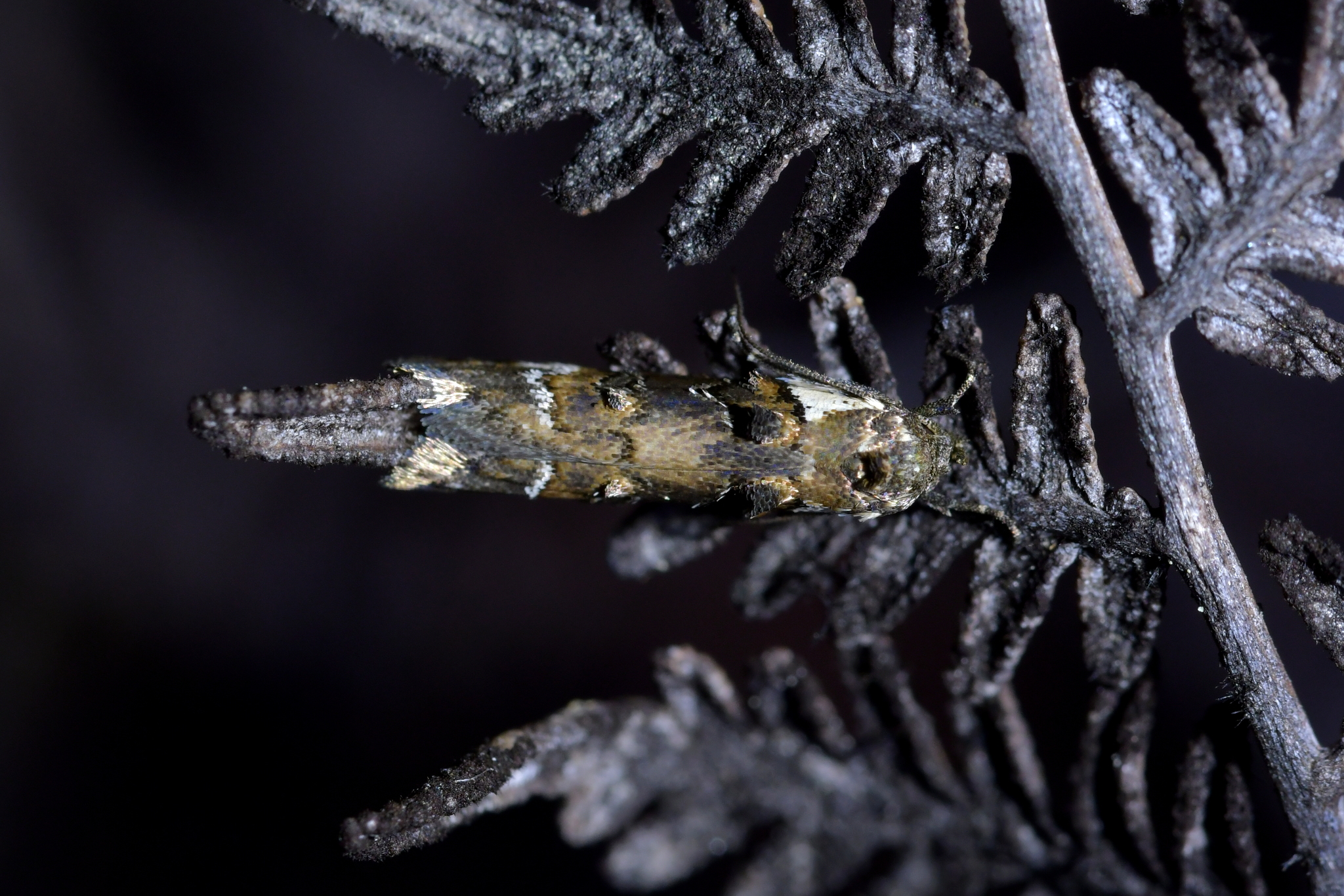

Scientific classification
- Kingdom: Animalia
- Phylum: Arthropoda
- Class: Insecta
- Order: Lepidoptera
- Family: Oecophoridae
- Genus: Trachypepla
- Species: T. conspicuella

Binomial name
- Trachypepla conspicuella (Walker, 1864)

Synonyms
- Gelechia conspicuella Walker, 1864; Gelechia taongella Felder & Rogenhofer, 1875

= Trachypepla conspicuella =

Species of moth endemic to New Zealand

Trachypepla conspicuella is a species of moth in the family Oecophoridae. It is endemic to New Zealand and is found in both the North and South Islands. It is similar in appearance to its close relative T. euryleucota but tends to be paler. Its colouration imitates bird droppings. Larvae feed on leaf litter. Adults of this species are on the wing from November to February and have been observed resting on fences and walls.

== Taxonomy ==
This species was first described by Francis Walker in 1864 and named Gelechia conspicuella using specimens collected in Nelson by T. R. Oxley. In 1875 Baron Cajetan von Felder and Alois Friedrich Rogenhofer, thinking they were describing a new species, illustrated and named this species as Gelechia taongella. In 1884 Edward Meyrick placed G. conspicuella within the genus Trachypepla and at the same time synonymised G. taongella. George Hudson discussed and illustrated this species in his 1928 book The butterflies and moths of New Zealand. The lectotype specimen is held at the Natural History Museum, London.

== Description ==
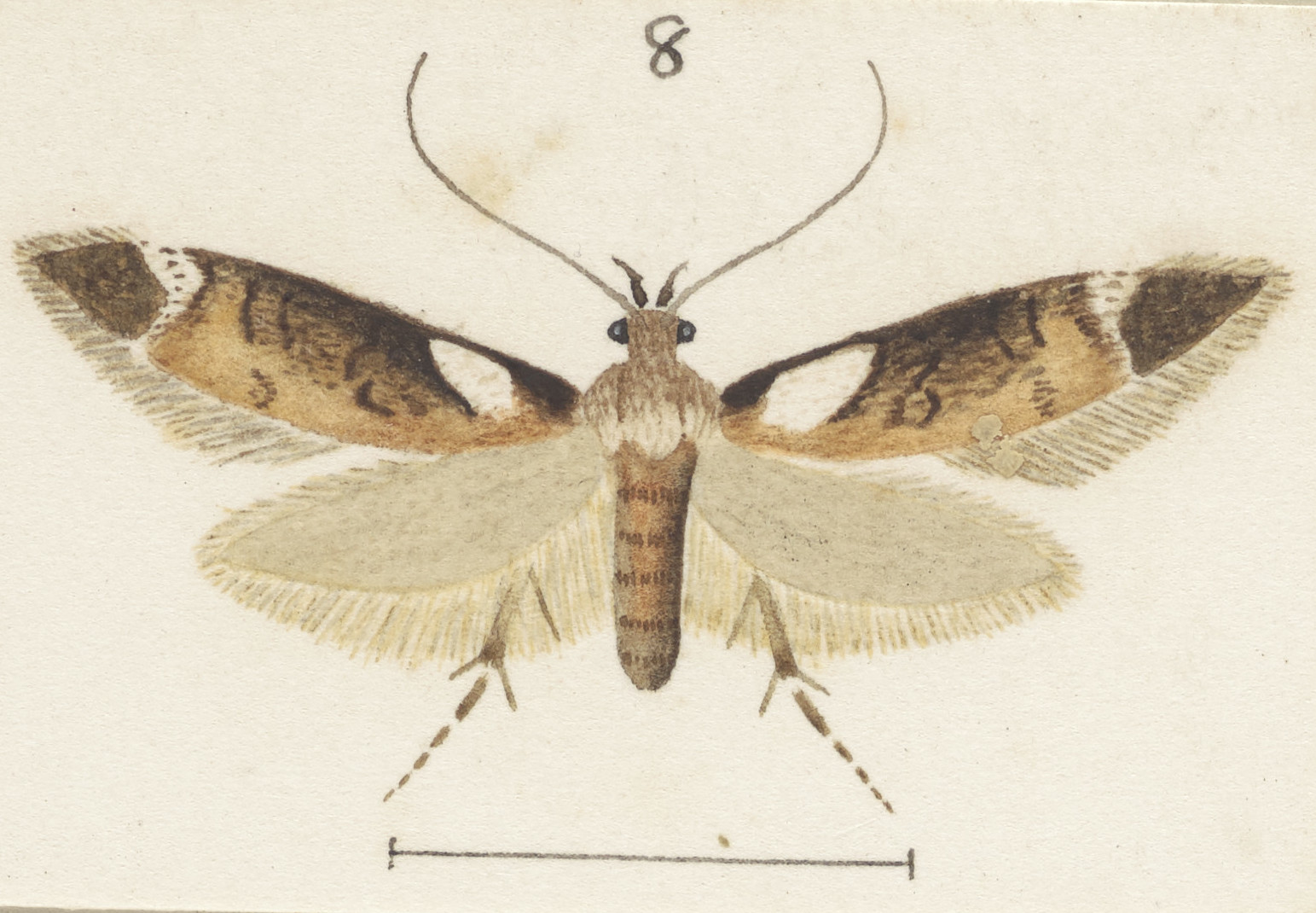
Illustration of female.

Walker described the adults of this species as follows:

Male. Blackish, cinereous beneath, allied to Oecophora. Palpi blackish, stout, much longer than the breadth of the head; third joint lanceolate, a little shorter than the second. Antennae smooth, much shorter than the fore wings. Thorax white, except in front. Abdomen cinereous. Tarsi with blackish bands. Wings rather broad, rounded at the tips; fringe long. Fore wings brownish cinereous along the interior border (except towards the base) and on full one-third of the length from the exterior border; a white band which is dilated on the interior border to the base of the wing, and has two black spots on the outer side; a whitish transverse line at three-fourths of the length, much dilated in front, bordered with black on the inner side; exterior border slightly convex, very oblique. Hind wings aeneous-cinereous. Length of the body 3 lines; of the wings 9 — 10 lines.

This species is variable in appearance but can be recognised by its brown thorax and pale basal patch. Darker specimens of this species can be confused with specimens of T. euryleucota. Hudson was of the opinion that the colouration of T. conspicuella imitates bird droppings.

== Distribution ==
This species is endemic to New Zealand and can be found in the North and South Islands. Other than the type locality of Nelson, this species has been collected at Wellington, Christchurch and Lake Wakatipu.

== Host species ==
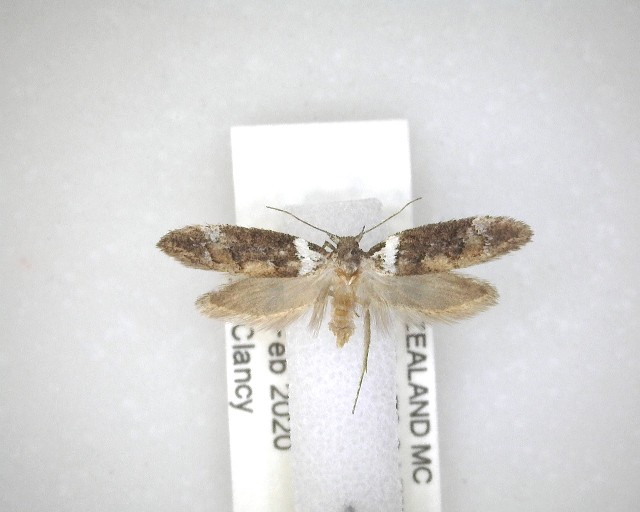

Meyrick hypothesised that the larvae of this species may feed on moss. However the larvae of T. conspicuella have been observed as feeding on leaf litter. They have also been observed emerging from "nests" built by the larvae of Hierodoris atychioides.

== Behaviour ==
Adults are on the wing from November to February. This moth is frequently observed resting on human made structures such as fences or walls and is known to enter houses.
