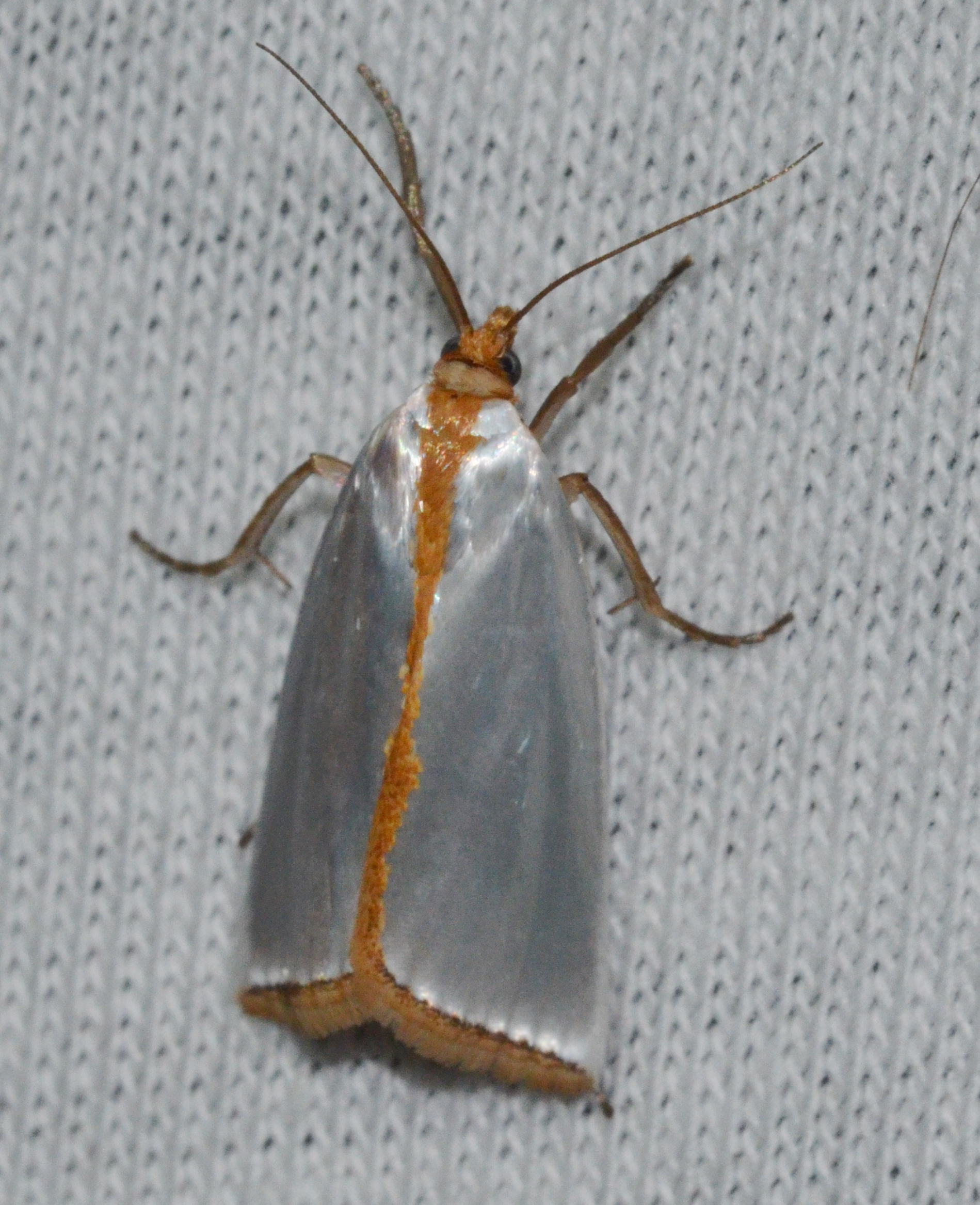

Scientific classification
- Kingdom: Animalia
- Phylum: Arthropoda
- Clade: Pancrustacea
- Class: Insecta
- Order: Lepidoptera
- Family: Crambidae
- Genus: Argyria
- Species: A. rufisignella

Binomial name
- Argyria rufisignella (Zeller, 1872)

Synonyms
- Catharylla rufisignella Zeller, 1872; Argyria rileyella rileyella Dyar, 1913; Argyria rufisignalis Schaus, 1940

= Argyria rufisignella =

Species of moth

Argyria rufisignella, the mother-of-pearl moth, is a moth in the family Crambidae. It was described by Philipp Christoph Zeller in 1872. It is found in North America, where it has been recorded from the eastern United States and in the south to Arizona.

The length of the forewings is 6–6.72 mm. The forewings are silvery white with a light brown costal margin. The hindwings are white.
