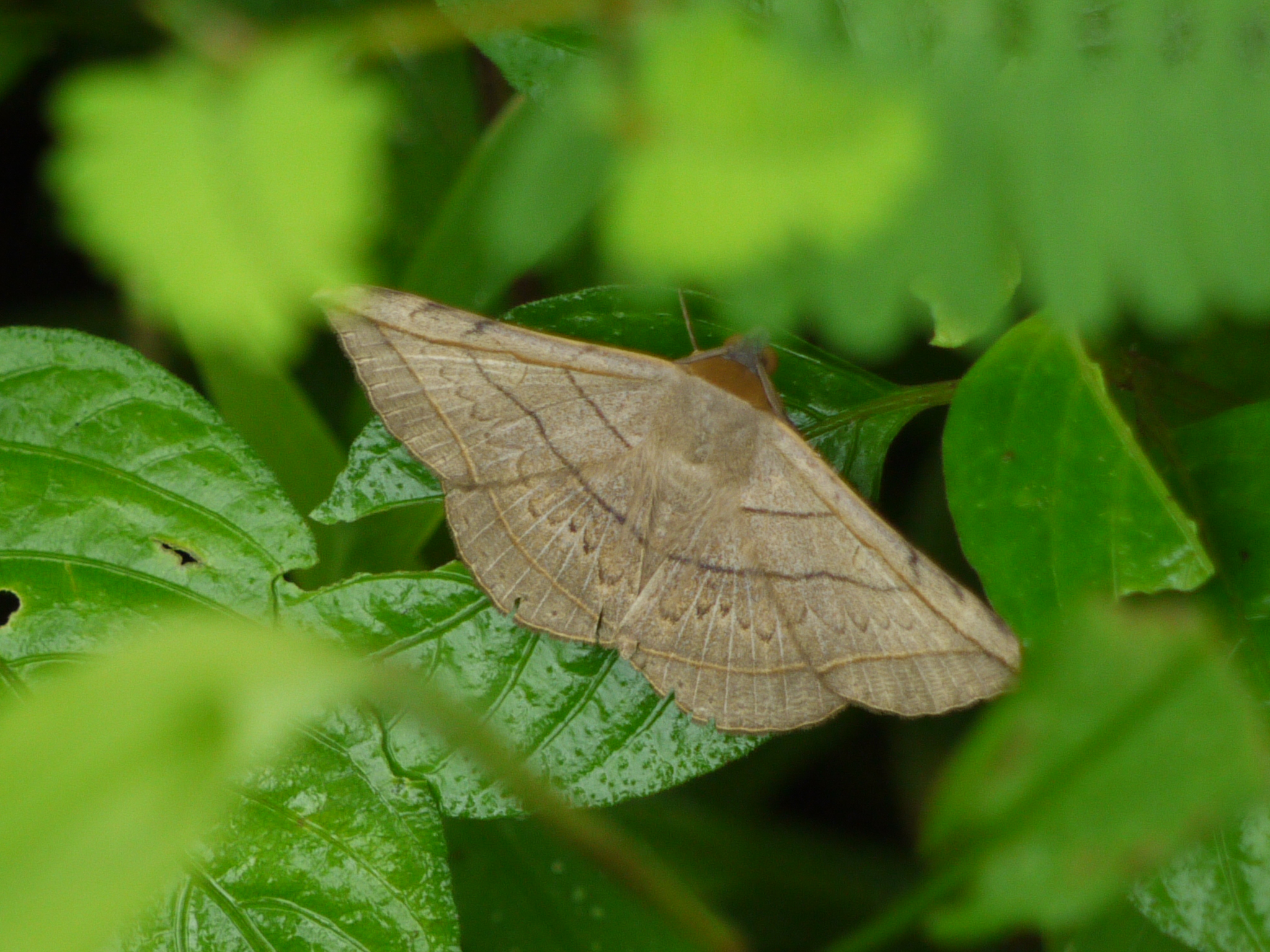

Scientific classification
- Kingdom: Animalia
- Phylum: Arthropoda
- Class: Insecta
- Order: Lepidoptera
- Superfamily: Noctuoidea
- Family: Noctuidae (?)
- Genus: Entomogramma
- Species: E. fautrix

Binomial name
- Entomogramma fautrix Guenée, 1852

= Entomogramma fautrix =

Species of moth

Entomogramma fautrix is a moth of the family Noctuidae first described by Achille Guenée in 1852. It is found in Sri Lanka, Taiwan and Bangladesh.

The wingspan of the male is 45 mm. Its body is fuscous brown. Head blackish. Forewing with a fulvous and dark streak below subcosta. Basal part of costa purplish. A black spot found at end of cell. Both wings with fine marginal ochreous line. Underside fuscous, with some orange on costal and outer areas.

== Gallery ==
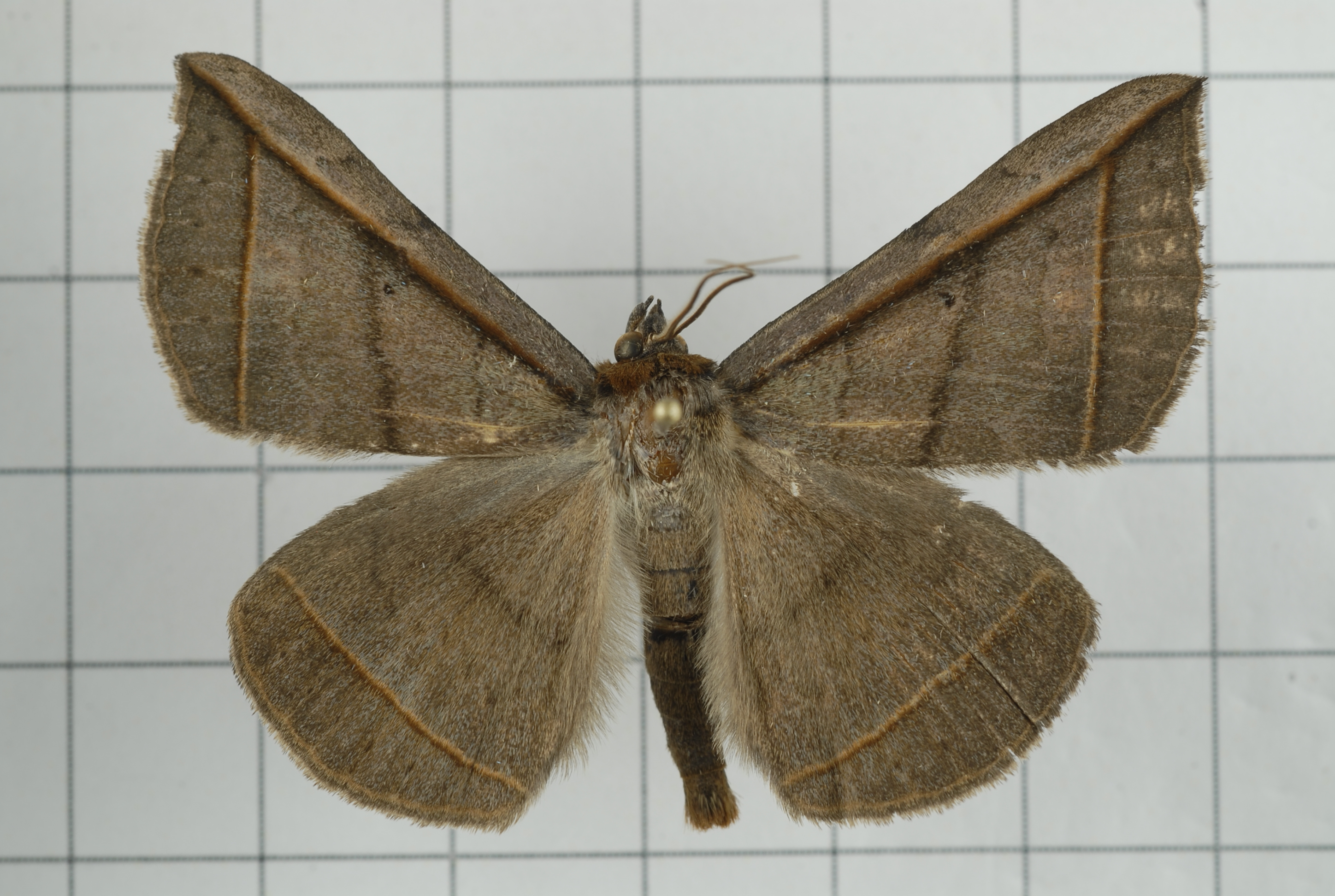

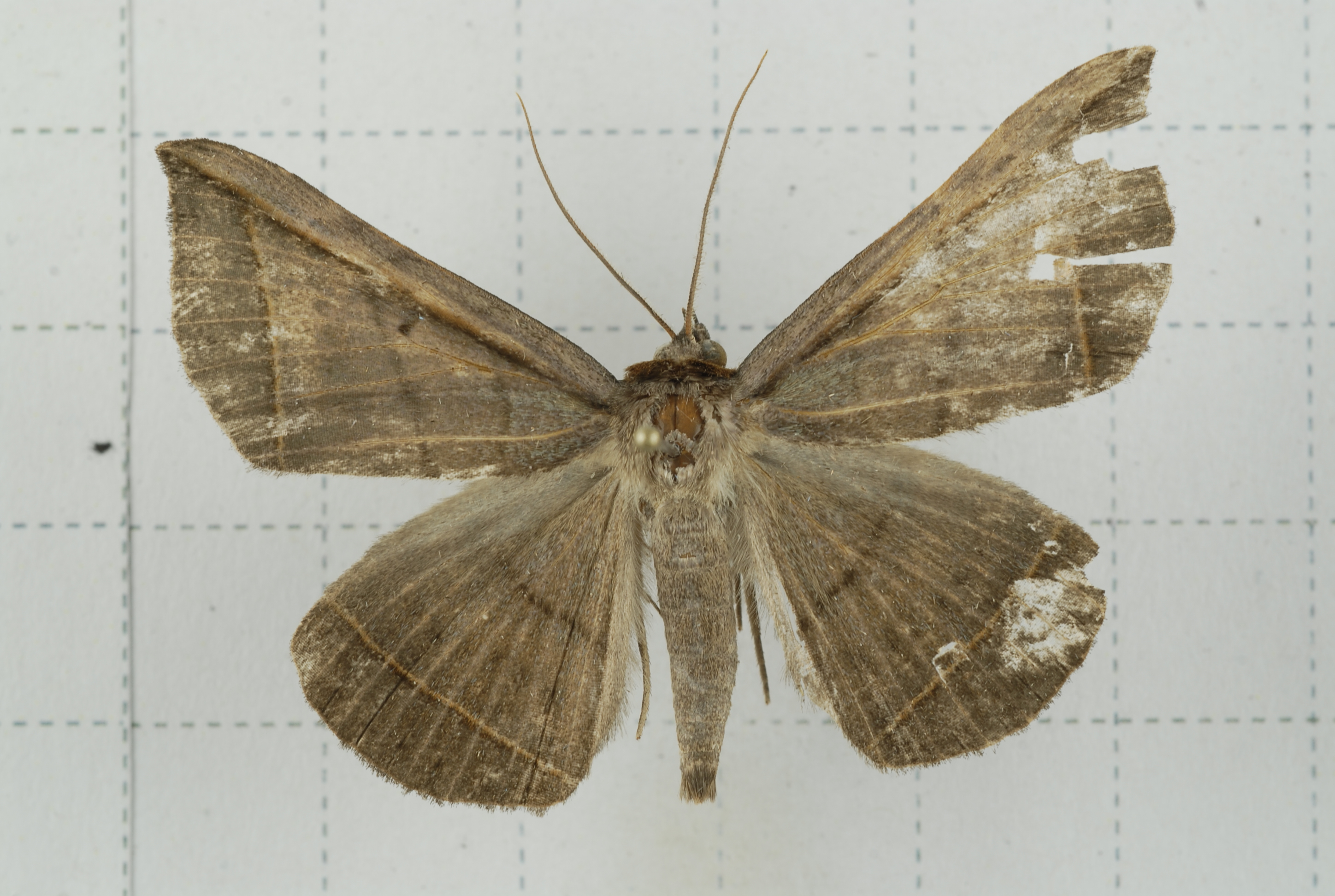

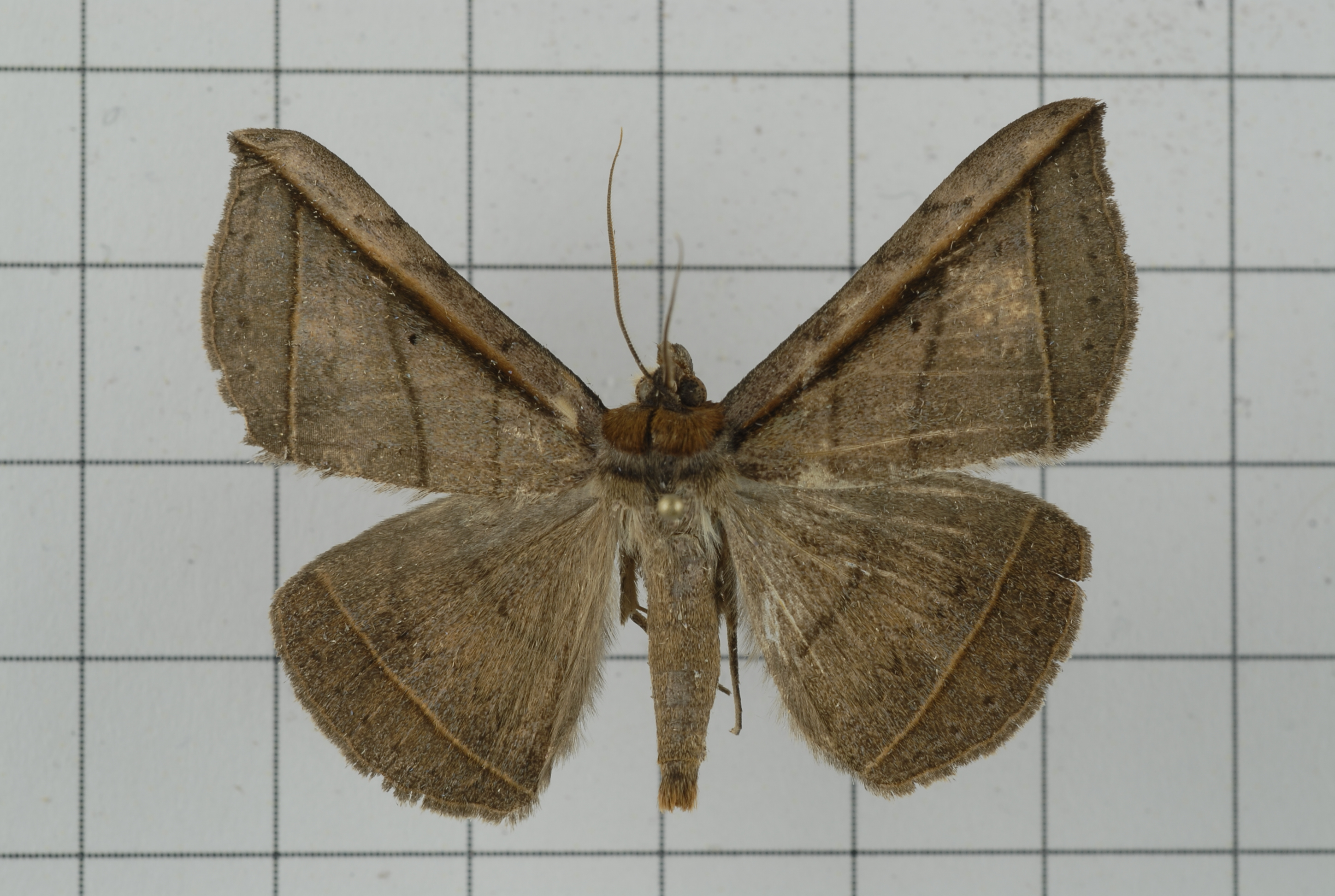
