= Argyria schausella =

Scientific classification
- Kingdom: Animalia
- Phylum: Arthropoda
- Class: Insecta
- Order: Lepidoptera
- Family: Crambidae
- Genus: Argyria
- Species: A. schausella

Binomial name
- Argyria schausella Dyar, 1913

Species of moth

Argyria schausella is a moth in the family Crambidae. It was described by Harrison Gray Dyar Jr. in 1913. It is found in Costa Rica.
