= Argyria venatella =

Scientific classification
- Kingdom: Animalia
- Phylum: Arthropoda
- Class: Insecta
- Order: Lepidoptera
- Family: Crambidae
- Genus: Argyria
- Species: A. venatella

Binomial name
- Argyria venatella (Schaus, 1922)

Synonyms
- Chilo venatella Schaus, 1922

Species of moth

Argyria venatella is a moth in the family Crambidae. It was described by Schaus in 1922. It is found in Cuba.
