= Argyria croceivittella =

Scientific classification
- Kingdom: Animalia
- Phylum: Arthropoda
- Class: Insecta
- Order: Lepidoptera
- Family: Crambidae
- Genus: Argyria
- Species: A. croceivittella

Binomial name
- Argyria croceivittella (Walker, 1863)

Synonyms
- Urola croceivittella Walker, 1863

Species of moth

Argyria croceivittella is a moth in the family Crambidae. It was described by Francis Walker in 1863. It is found in Rio de Janeiro, Brazil.
