= Argyria multifacta =

Scientific classification
- Domain: Eukaryota
- Kingdom: Animalia
- Phylum: Arthropoda
- Class: Insecta
- Order: Lepidoptera
- Family: Crambidae
- Genus: Argyria
- Species: A. multifacta

Binomial name
- Argyria multifacta Dyar, 1914

Species of moth

Argyria multifacta is a moth in the family Crambidae. It was described by Harrison Gray Dyar Jr. in 1914. It is found in Panama.
