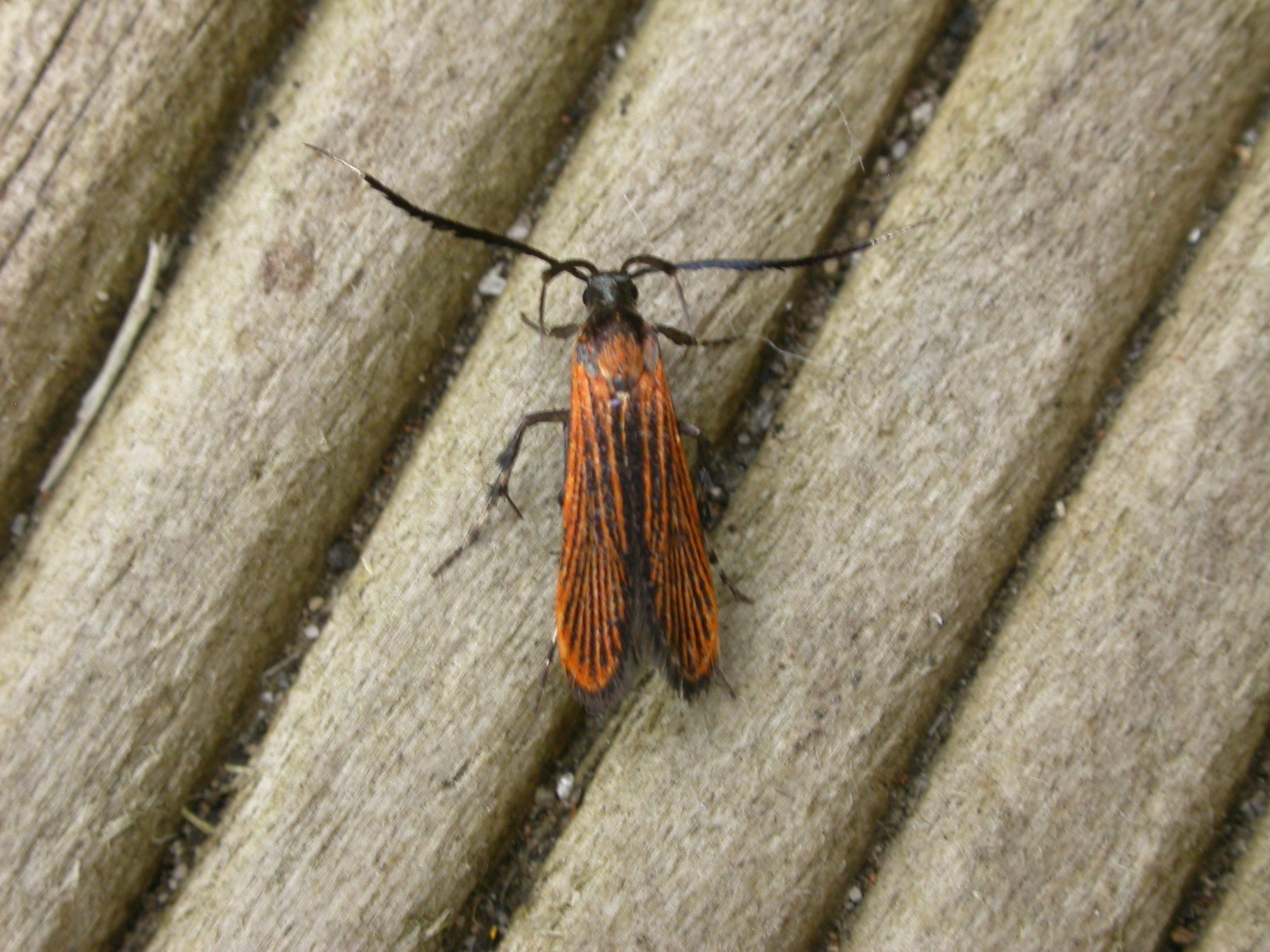

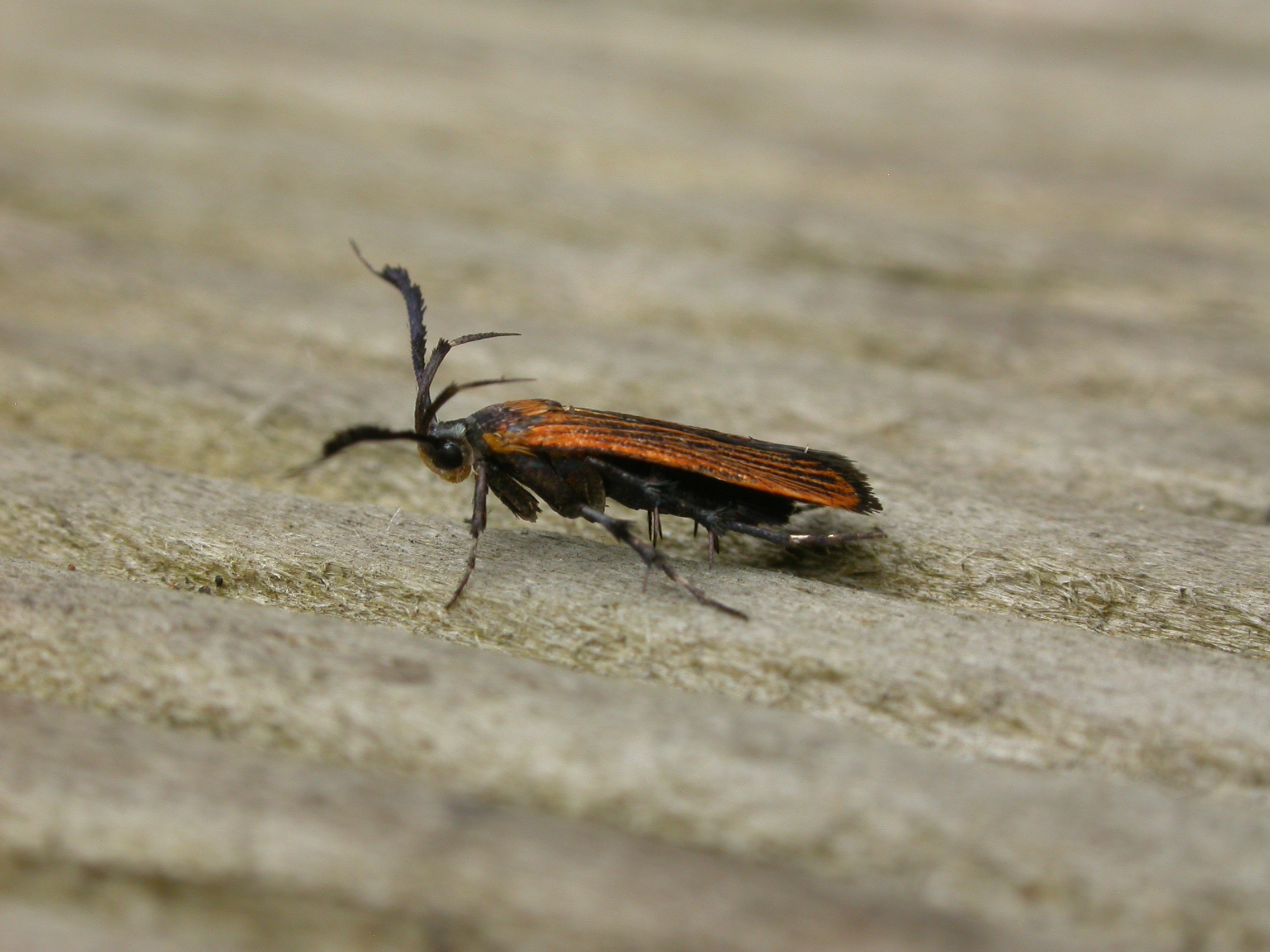

Scientific classification
- Kingdom: Animalia
- Phylum: Arthropoda
- Class: Insecta
- Order: Lepidoptera
- Family: Stathmopodidae
- Genus: Snellenia
- Species: S. lineata

Binomial name
- Snellenia lineata (Walker, 1856)

Synonyms
- Tinaegeria lineata Walker 1856; Eretmocera sesioides Felder & Rogenhofer, 1875

= Snellenia lineata =

Species of moth

The lycid-mimicking moth (Snellenia lineata) is a species of moth of the family Stathmopodidae. It is found Australia in the Australian Capital Territory, New South Wales, Queensland and Victoria.

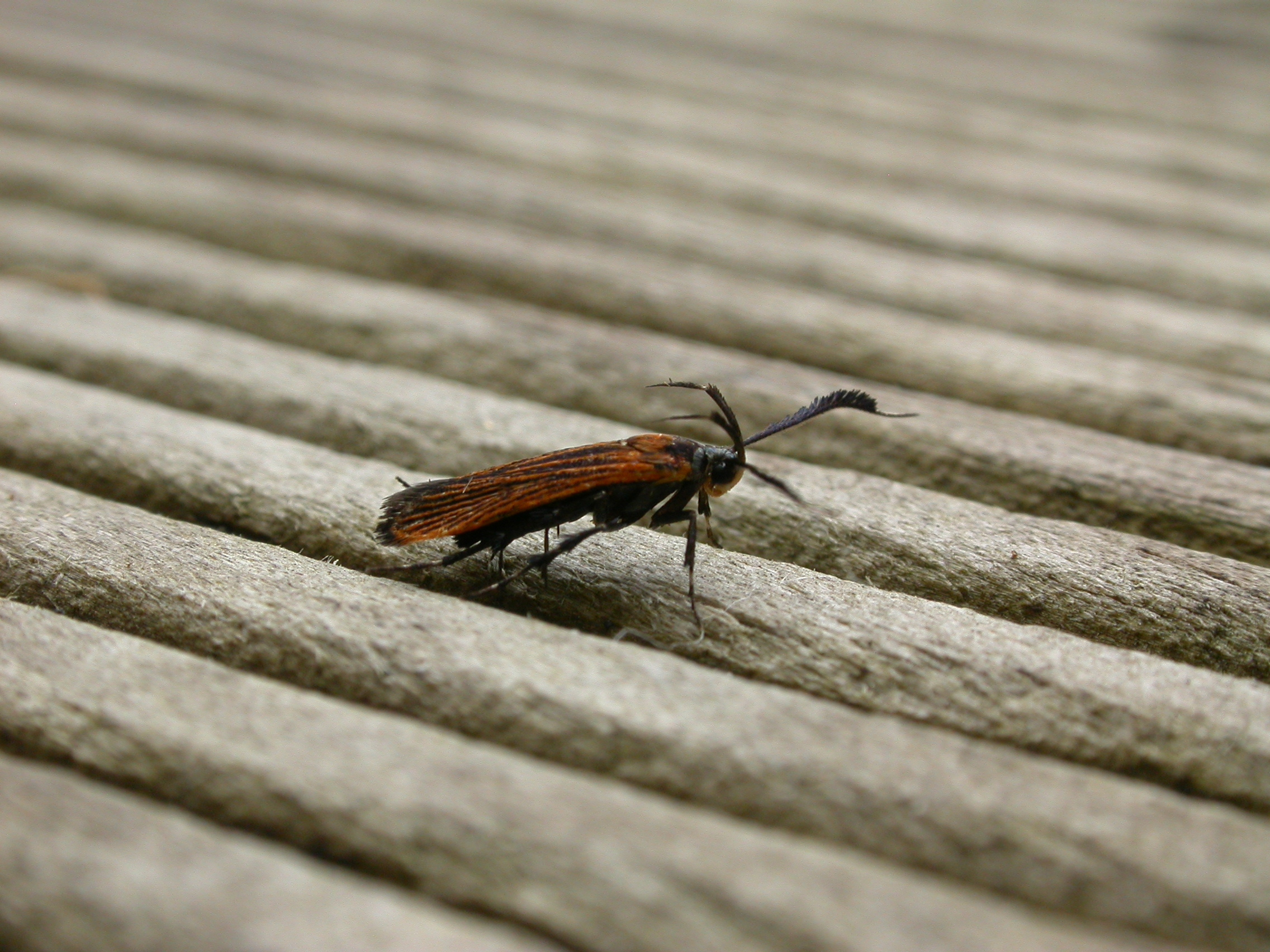

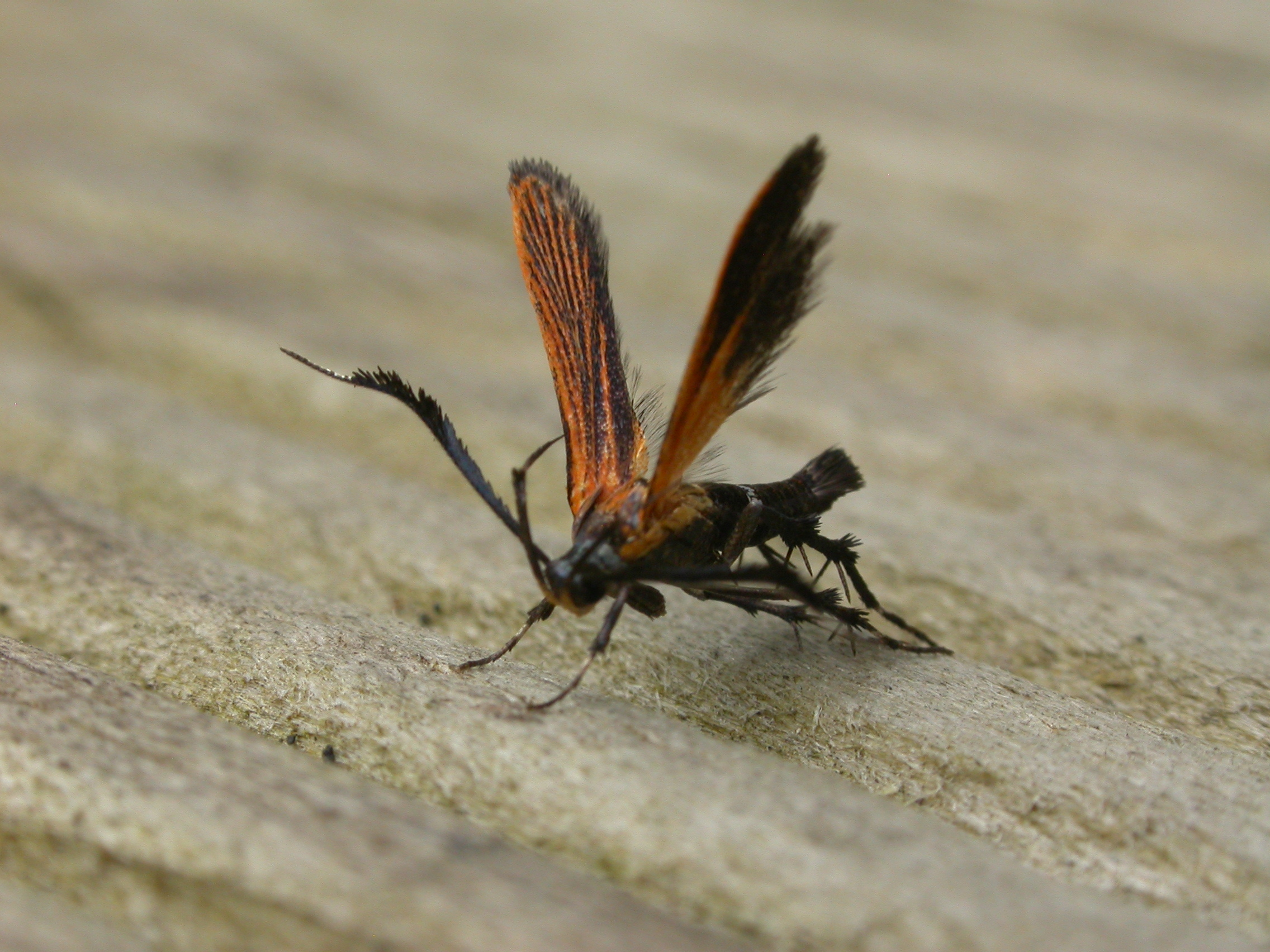
