= Micrelephas mesodonta =

Scientific classification
- Kingdom: Animalia
- Phylum: Arthropoda
- Clade: Pancrustacea
- Class: Insecta
- Order: Lepidoptera
- Family: Crambidae
- Subfamily: Crambinae
- Tribe: incertae sedis
- Genus: Micrelephas
- Species: M. mesodonta

Binomial name
- Micrelephas mesodonta (Zeller, 1877)

Synonyms
- Argyria mesodonta Zeller, 1877; Argyria mesodonta submesodonta Bleszynski, 1960

Species of moth

Micrelephas mesodonta is a moth in the family Crambidae. It was described by Zeller in 1877. It is found in Bolivia and Peru.
