= Micrelephas interruptus =

Scientific classification
- Kingdom: Animalia
- Phylum: Arthropoda
- Clade: Pancrustacea
- Class: Insecta
- Order: Lepidoptera
- Family: Crambidae
- Subfamily: Crambinae
- Tribe: incertae sedis
- Genus: Micrelephas
- Species: M. interruptus

Binomial name
- Micrelephas interruptus (Zeller, 1866)

Synonyms
- Catharylla interruptus Zeller, 1866; Argyria antonialis Schaus, 1922; Argyria mesozonalis Hampson, 1919; Argyria mezozonalis Bleszynski, 1960

Species of moth

Micrelephas interruptus is a moth in the family Crambidae. It was described by Zeller in 1866. It is found in Venezuela, Colombia and Peru.
