= Rudolf Felder =

Austrian jurist and entomologist (1842–1871)

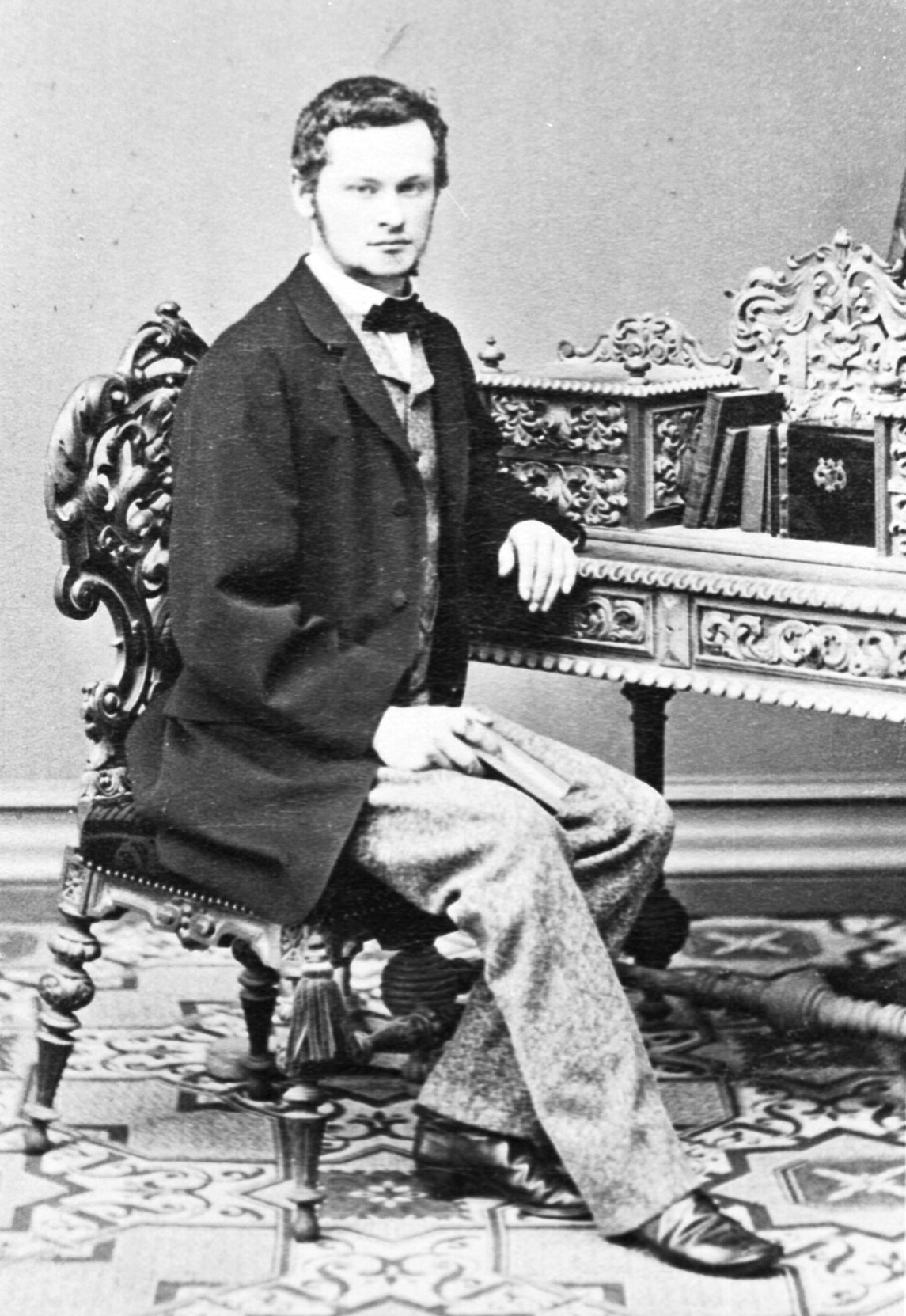

Rudolf Felder (2 May 1842 in Vienna – 29 March 1871 in Vienna) was an Austrian jurist and entomologist. He was mainly interested in Lepidoptera, amassing, with his father, Cajetan Felder, a huge collection.

== Works ==
- with Cajetan Felder, Lepidopterologische Fragmente. Wiener Entomologische Monatschrift 3:390–405. (1859)
- Lepidopterorum Amboinensium a Dre L. Doleschall annis 1856 - 1868 collectorum species novae, diagnostibus collustratae. Sitzungsberichten der k. Akademie der Wissenschaften zu Wien, Jahr. (1860 or 1861).
- with Cajetan Felder and Alois Friedrich Rogenhofer Reise der österreichischen Fregatte Novara um die Erde. . . .. Zool. Theil. Vol. 2, Part 2. Lepidoptera. (Vienna) (1865).

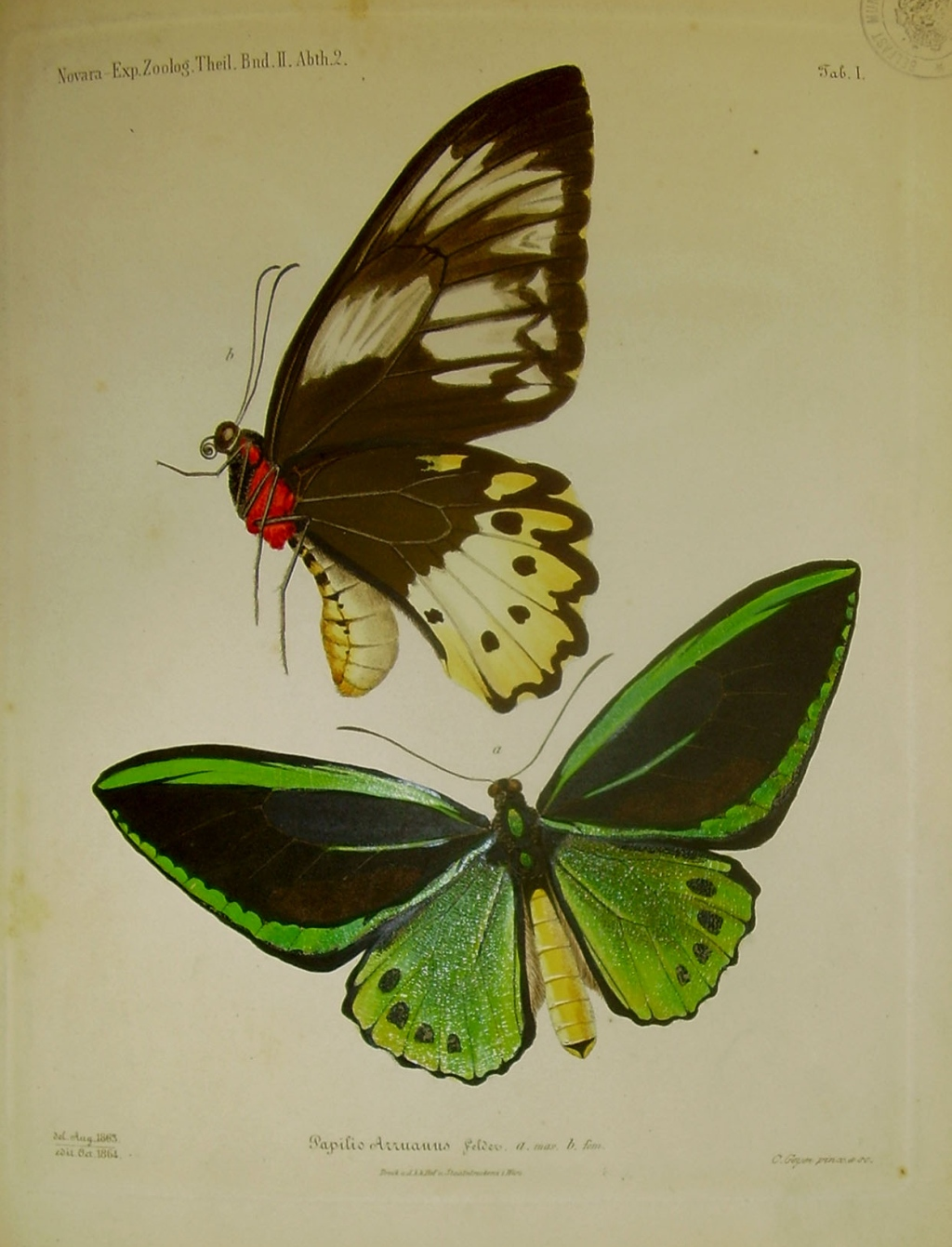
Plate from Felder's work Reise Fregatte Novara
