= Alois Friedrich Rogenhofer =

Austrian entomologist

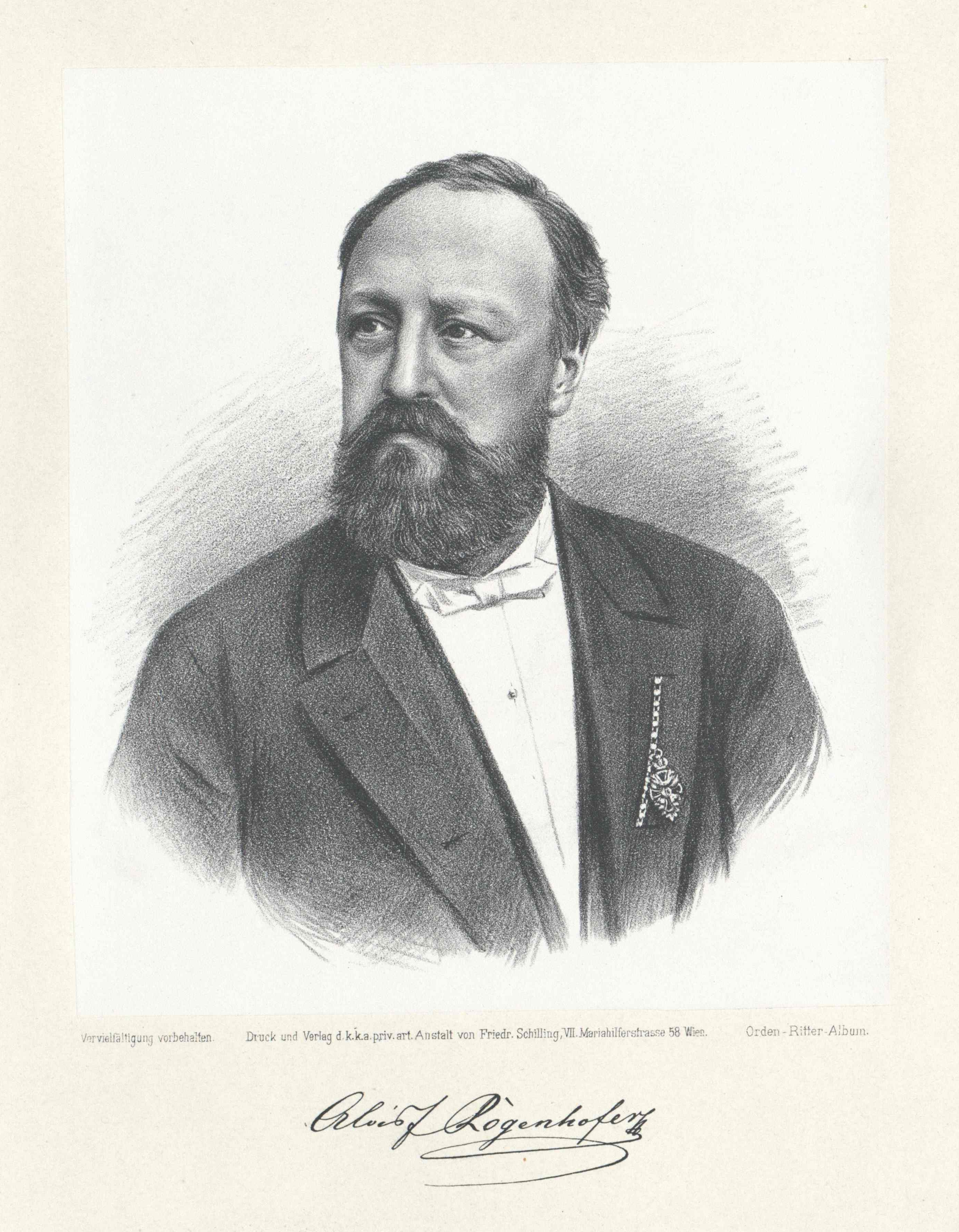
Alois F. Rogenhofer

Alois Friedrich Rogenhofer (22 December 1831, in Vienna – 15 January 1897, in Vienna) was an Austrian entomologist. He was a curator at the Naturhistorisches Museum in Vienna, where he was the first keeper of the Lepidoptera. Rogenhofer was mainly interested in Lepidoptera, and Hymenoptera.

Rogenhoer studied law in Vienna but after passing the law exam he worked as a volunteer in the zoological museum becoming an assistant in 1860 and a curator in 1867. He described a number of species of lepidoptera, particularly those collected on the Novara expedition. Beside him Josef Mann (1804-1889) worked as a keen technician and collector for the benefits of the museum. Mann described many species of Lepidoptera new to science focussing on Microlepidoptera.

== Works ==
- with Cajetan Freiherr von Felder and Rudolf Felder Reise Fregatte Novara. Lepidoptera.Three volumes (1865-1867).
