= Ethmia submissa =

Scientific classification
- Domain: Eukaryota
- Kingdom: Animalia
- Phylum: Arthropoda
- Class: Insecta
- Order: Lepidoptera
- Family: Depressariidae
- Genus: Ethmia
- Species: E. submissa

Binomial name
- Ethmia submissa Busck, 1914

Species of moth

Ethmia submissa is a moth in the family Depressariidae. It is found in Cuba, Jamaica and Puerto Rico. It has also been recorded from southern Florida in the United States.

The length of the forewings is 7–8.7 mm (0.28–0.34 in). It is similar in forewing pattern to Ethmia elutella, but has reduced gray clouding and the dorsal and terminal patches are dark purple rather than the bronzy or coppery purplish of E. elutella and Ethmia janzeni. The ground color of the hindwings is white, becoming pale brownish toward the margins. Adults are on wing in February and March (in Jamaica), in April, May and July (in Puerto Rico) and in November and December (in Cuba). There are multiple generations per year.
