= Antaeotricha fraterna =

Scientific classification
- Domain: Eukaryota
- Kingdom: Animalia
- Phylum: Arthropoda
- Class: Insecta
- Order: Lepidoptera
- Family: Depressariidae
- Genus: Antaeotricha
- Species: A. fraterna

Binomial name
- Antaeotricha fraterna (Felder & Rogenhofer, 1875)

Synonyms
- Cryptolechia fraterna Felder & Rogenhofer, 1875; Antaeotricha perfusa Meyrick, 1916

Species of moth

Antaeotricha fraterna is a moth of the family Depressariidae. It is found in Brazil (Amazonas) and French Guiana.

The wingspan is 18–19 mm. The forewings are whitish ochreous with a dark fuscous basal dot above the middle and some slight fuscous suffusion towards the dorsum at the base and beyond the first two lines. There are three dark fuscous transverse lines, the first from one-fifth of the costa to the middle of the dorsum, somewhat irregular, the second from the middle of the costa to four-fifths of the dorsum, slightly sinuate outwards in the middle, the third from three-fourths of the costa to the tornus, almost straight or slightly indented above the middle. There are also seven dark fuscous marginal dots around the apex and termen. The hindwings are whitish with a very long white subcostal hair-pencil from the base lying beneath the forewings, reaching four-fifths of the wing.
