= Stenoma haploxyla =

Scientific classification
- Domain: Eukaryota
- Kingdom: Animalia
- Phylum: Arthropoda
- Class: Insecta
- Order: Lepidoptera
- Family: Depressariidae
- Genus: Stenoma
- Species: S. haploxyla

Binomial name
- Stenoma haploxyla Meyrick, 1915

Species of moth

Stenoma haploxyla is a moth of the family Depressariidae. It is found in Suriname.

The wingspan is about 18 mm (0.71 in). The forewings are brownish ochreous, the costa more brownish posteriorly and with two oblique series of two or three dark fuscous elongate marks each towards the costa about one-third and beyond the middle. The discal stigmata are dark fuscous and there is some dark fuscous suffusion towards the dorsum before the middle and about two-thirds. There is also a terminal series of dark fuscous dots. The hindwings are ochreous whitish with a long ochreous-whitish hair-pencil enclosed in a subdorsal fold.
