= Antaeotricha umbratella =

Scientific classification
- Kingdom: Animalia
- Phylum: Arthropoda
- Class: Insecta
- Order: Lepidoptera
- Family: Depressariidae
- Genus: Antaeotricha
- Species: A. umbratella

Binomial name
- Antaeotricha umbratella Walker, 1864

Synonyms
- Stenoma pallulella Busck, 1914; Antaeotricha lacertosa Meyrick, 1915

Species of moth

Antaeotricha umbratella is a moth in the family Depressariidae. It was described by Francis Walker in 1864. It is found in Brazil (Amazonas), Panama, Costa Rica, Guyana and French Guiana.

The wingspan is 21–22 mm. The forewings are rather dark fuscous, the basal third clouded with blackish fuscous and with irregular rather oblique blackish-fuscous shades before and beyond the middle. Dorsal projecting scales at one-third are tipped with ferruginous. The costal half of the wing on the median third is suffusedly mixed with whitish and the second discal stigma is large and blackish, more or less surrounded with whitish. There is also an irregular subterminal line of whitish irroration (sprinkling) from four-fifths of the costa to the tornus, indented towards the costa, preceded by a blackish-fuscous shade, and terminal area beyond it wholly blackish fuscous. The hindwings are dark fuscous and the costal margin is expanded to three-fourths, with long projecting whitish hairscales, and long whitish subcostal hair-pencil lying beneath the forewings.
