= Antaeotricha substricta =

Scientific classification
- Domain: Eukaryota
- Kingdom: Animalia
- Phylum: Arthropoda
- Class: Insecta
- Order: Lepidoptera
- Family: Depressariidae
- Genus: Antaeotricha
- Species: A. substricta

Binomial name
- Antaeotricha substricta Meyrick, 1918

Species of moth

Antaeotricha substricta is a species of moth of the family Depressariidae. It is found in French Guiana.

The wingspan is about 15 mm. The forewings are white, slightly tinged grey, especially towards the dorsum and with dark fuscous markings. There is a very oblique streak from the base of the costa, becoming longitudinal and reaching one-fifth. There is also a mark on the base of the dorsum and an irregular suffused streak from one-fifth of the costa to the dorsum beyond the middle, sharply dentate-angulated outwards in the middle (with the angle indicating the first discal stigma), and with a smaller dentation below the middle, enlarged into a spot on the dorsum. There is some fuscous suffusion towards the dorsum beyond this and an irregular line from the middle of the costa to a subtriangular spot on the tornus, the second discal stigma forming a dot attached to its posterior edge. A straight cloudy line runs from the costa at three-fourths to the middle of the termen, on the costa forming a wedge-shaped dilation and there are six cloudy blackish terminal dots. The hindwings are whitish-grey, with the costa somewhat expanded on the anterior half, a pale whitish-ochreous subcostal hair-pencil extending from the base to two-thirds, the costa beyond this whitish suffused.
