= Stenoma acratodes =

Scientific classification
- Domain: Eukaryota
- Kingdom: Animalia
- Phylum: Arthropoda
- Class: Insecta
- Order: Lepidoptera
- Family: Depressariidae
- Genus: Stenoma
- Species: S. acratodes

Binomial name
- Stenoma acratodes Meyrick, 1916

Species of moth

Stenoma acratodes is a moth of the family Depressariidae. It is found in the Guianas.

The wingspan is 18–19 mm. The forewings are whitish-grey ochreous, the costal edge light brownish ochreous with a slender brown streak along the dorsum from one-fourth to the tornus. The plical and second discal stigmata are minute and dark grey, sometimes nearly obsolete. There are very faint traces of rather oblique lines from the costa at one-third and beyond the middle, as well as a fine somewhat curved brownish-ochreous line from three-fourths of the costa to the dorsum before the tornus. The terminal edge is brownish ochreous, obscurely dotted with dark grey. The hindwings are rather light grey with a long grey hair-pencil from the base lying along a subdorsal fold.
