= Antaeotricha marmorea =

Scientific classification
- Kingdom: Animalia
- Phylum: Arthropoda
- Class: Insecta
- Order: Lepidoptera
- Family: Depressariidae
- Genus: Antaeotricha
- Species: A. marmorea

Binomial name
- Antaeotricha marmorea (Felder & Rogenhofer, 1875)

Synonyms
- Antaeotricha mentigera Meyrick, 1926; Antaeotricha quatiens Meyrick, 1930; Antaeotricha thalamobathra Meyrick, 1932

Species of insect

Antaeotricha marmorea is a moth of the family Depressariidae. It is found in Brazil (Amazonas, Para) and Bolivia.

The wingspan is 24–25 mm. The forewings are greyish-ochreous with the extreme costal edge white except towards the base. There is a subcrescentic suffused white spot beneath the costa at one-fifth, and a patch of marbling at two-fifths, between these some dark fuscous irroration. A very acutely dentate suffused white line is found from the middle of the costa very obliquely outwards, curved in the disc and below the middle represented by lines on the veins, towards the costa preceded by dark fuscous irroration or suffusion. The dorsal edge and veins on the dorsal area are finely white, with some whitish tinge or suffusion between these. There is a slightly curved white line from the costa at four-fifths to the tornus, indented towards the costa. Some slight dark fuscous irroration is found above the apex between the veins. The hindwings are white posteriorly suffused light grey with the costa expanded anteriorly, with a strong projecting fringe to beyond the middle of dense whitish-grey hairscales becoming white at the tips, with a long expansible ochreous-whitish subcostal hair-pencil from the base to two-thirds.
