= Antaeotricha lignicolor =

Scientific classification
- Kingdom: Animalia
- Phylum: Arthropoda
- Clade: Pancrustacea
- Class: Insecta
- Order: Lepidoptera
- Family: Depressariidae
- Genus: Antaeotricha
- Species: A. lignicolor

Binomial name
- Antaeotricha lignicolor Zeller, 1877

Synonyms
- Antaeotricha emollita Meyrick, 1926

Species of moth

Antaeotricha lignicolor is a species of moth of the family Depressariidae. It is found in Peru and Colombia.

The wingspan is about 25 mm. The forewings are rather dark bronzy-brown, the costal edge whitish and the basal fourth with the dorsum and some irregular markings suffused dark fuscous, two enclosing a whitish spot beneath the costa. The costal half from one-fourth to three-fourths is lighter, and broadly suffused whitish towards the costa except on a spot somewhat beyond the middle. The dorsal area beneath the fold is suffused dark fuscous with a few whitish scales. The second discal stigma is cloudy and dark fuscous and there is a whitish line from the costa near the apex to the tornus, indented towards the costa. A waved whitish-ochreous marginal line is found around the apex and termen, with obscure dots of darker suffusion preceding this. The hindwings are dark grey with the costa broadly expanded on the anterior half with a fringe of dense projecting grey hairscales tipped whitish, with expansible whitish hair-pencil in the subcostal groove from the base to beyond the middle.
