= Gonioterma inga =

Scientific classification
- Domain: Eukaryota
- Kingdom: Animalia
- Phylum: Arthropoda
- Class: Insecta
- Order: Lepidoptera
- Family: Depressariidae
- Genus: Gonioterma
- Species: G. inga

Binomial name
- Gonioterma inga Busck, 1911

Species of moth

Gonioterma inga is a moth in the family Depressariidae. It was described by August Busck in 1911. It is found in French Guiana.

The wingspan is about 22 mm. The forewings are light bluish drab, but darker in shade than in Stenoma inflata. There are two deep black costal spots, one on the middle, the other at the apical fifth. The extreme costal edge is rust red, the colour of the underside. There is a faint outwardly curved row of small black dots from the outer costal spot to the dorsum, parallel with the terminal edge and a similar row on the terminal edge. The hindwings are light yellow.
