= Gonioterma latipennis =

Scientific classification
- Kingdom: Animalia
- Phylum: Arthropoda
- Clade: Pancrustacea
- Class: Insecta
- Order: Lepidoptera
- Family: Depressariidae
- Genus: Gonioterma
- Species: G. latipennis

Binomial name
- Gonioterma latipennis (Zeller, 1877)

Synonyms
- Cryptolechia latipennis Zeller, 1877; Stenoma algosa Meyrick, 1916

Species of moth

Gonioterma latipennis is a moth of the family Depressariidae. It is found in Colombia and French Guiana.

The wingspan is 21–23 mm. The forewings are whitish ochreous, the costa irregularly suffused with deep olive green, beneath this some fine scattered irregular whitish markings. The plical stigma is minute and dark fuscous with several white marginal dots around the apex, larger on the costa. The hindwings are ochreous whitish with a long pale greyish-ochreous hair-pencil from the base lying in a subdorsal fold.
