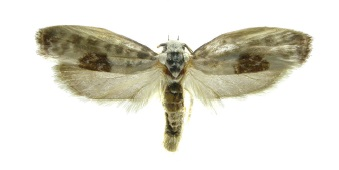

Scientific classification
- Kingdom: Animalia
- Phylum: Arthropoda
- Clade: Pancrustacea
- Class: Insecta
- Order: Lepidoptera
- Family: Depressariidae
- Genus: Ethmia
- Species: E. janzeni

Binomial name
- Ethmia janzeni Powell, 1973

= Ethmia janzeni =

Species of moth

Ethmia janzeni is a moth in the family Depressariidae. It is found from Mexico to San Salvador, as well as in north-western Costa Rica. The habitat consists of dry forests and rain forests.

The length of the forewings is 7.3–8.5 mm (0.29–0.33 in). It is similar to the closely related species Ethmia elutella, but differs by having a generally paler color and an ocherous rather than gray hindwing costal hair-pencil. The ground color of the hindwings is white near the base, becoming pale grayish toward the margins.
