= Antaeotricha mesosaris =

Scientific classification
- Kingdom: Animalia
- Phylum: Arthropoda
- Clade: Pancrustacea
- Class: Insecta
- Order: Lepidoptera
- Family: Depressariidae
- Genus: Antaeotricha
- Species: A. mesosaris

Binomial name
- Antaeotricha mesosaris (Meyrick, 1925)

Synonyms
- Stenoma mesosaris Meyrick, 1925

Species of moth

Antaeotricha mesosaris is a moth of the family Depressariidae. It is found in French Guiana.

The wingspan is about 10 mm. The forewings are ochreous-whitish, whiter towards the costa and with a short thick dark fuscous streak along the base of the dorsum and a few fuscous specks scattered in a line from the costa beyond one-fourth to the middle of the dorsum, with minute dark fuscous first discal and large plical and dorsal dots. There is a slightly curved cloudy dark fuscous streak from the costa at three-fifths to the dorsum at three-fourths, traversing the blackish second discal stigma, and a similar nearly straight streak from the costa at five-sixths to the tornus, the space between these more or less tinged grey except on the costa. The hindwings are whitish-hyaline, with the veins and terminal area greyish and with an expansible whitish hair-pencil rising from the end of the cell.
