= Stenoma ventilatrix =

Scientific classification
- Domain: Eukaryota
- Kingdom: Animalia
- Phylum: Arthropoda
- Class: Insecta
- Order: Lepidoptera
- Family: Depressariidae
- Genus: Stenoma
- Species: S. ventilatrix

Binomial name
- Stenoma ventilatrix Meyrick, 1916

Species of moth

Stenoma ventilatrix is a moth of the family Depressariidae. It is found in French Guiana.

The wingspan is about 26 mm. The forewings are whitish-lilac grey, with the costal edge white. The stigmata are dark fuscous, the plical obliquely beyond the first discal. There is a series of indistinct small grey dots from near the costa at two-fifths very obliquely outwards to beyond the cell, then continued as a faint irregular line to the dorsal extremity of the following. There is a cloudy grey line from four-fifths of the costa to the dorsum before the tornus, sinuate indented towards the costa, then moderately curved. A marginal series of blackish dots is found around the apex and termen. The hindwings are rather dark grey with a slender ochreous-whitish hair-pencil from the base lying in a lateral groove of the abdomen.
