= Stenoma zephyritis =

Scientific classification
- Kingdom: Animalia
- Phylum: Arthropoda
- Class: Insecta
- Order: Lepidoptera
- Family: Depressariidae
- Genus: Stenoma
- Species: S. zephyritis

Binomial name
- Stenoma zephyritis Meyrick, 1925

Species of moth

Stenoma zephyritis is a moth of the family Depressariidae. It is found in Pará, Brazil.

The wingspan is about 19 mm. The forewings are pale ochreous, the veins posteriorly obscurely suffused fuscous, the costal edge whitish, margined fuscous beneath. The stigmata are blackish, the plical obliquely beyond the first discal. There is an irregular strongly curved subterminal series of dark fuscous undefined dots, deeply indented towards the costa. There is also a marginal series of dark fuscous dots around the apex and termen. The hindwings are ochreous whitish, with the costa slenderly reflexed above from the base to two-thirds, enclosing an ochreous-whitish hair-pencil.
