= Antaeotricha palaestrias =

Scientific classification
- Domain: Eukaryota
- Kingdom: Animalia
- Phylum: Arthropoda
- Class: Insecta
- Order: Lepidoptera
- Family: Depressariidae
- Genus: Antaeotricha
- Species: A. palaestrias

Binomial name
- Antaeotricha palaestrias Meyrick, 1916

Species of moth

Antaeotricha palaestrias is a species of moth of the family Depressariidae. It is found in French Guiana.

The wingspan is 13–15 mm. The forewings are shining white with dark fuscous markings. There is a longitudinal line from the base of the costa to one-fifth of the disc and a short dash beneath the apex of this. There is a small spot on the base of the dorsum and a rather short oblique line in the disc about one-fourth, as well as a triangular blotch towards the middle of the dorsum reaching nearly half across the wing. There is also a dash in the middle of the disc, and one rather before and above this sometimes little marked and there is a quadrate blotch on the dorsum before the tornus, reaching nearly half across the wing. Hardly curved lines are found from the costa at the middle and three-fourths running to the upper angles of this blotch and there is a dash in the disc above the middle between these, as well as a small suffused apical spot. Three or four black marginal dots are found around the apex. The hindwings are grey-whitish with a long whitish subcostal hair-pencil from the base lying beneath the forewings.
