= Antaeotricha sarcinata =

Scientific classification
- Kingdom: Animalia
- Phylum: Arthropoda
- Class: Insecta
- Order: Lepidoptera
- Family: Depressariidae
- Genus: Antaeotricha
- Species: A. sarcinata

Binomial name
- Antaeotricha sarcinata Meyrick, 1918

Species of moth

Antaeotricha sarcinata is a moth of the family Depressariidae. It is found in French Guiana.

The wingspan is about 17 mm. The forewings are white slightly sprinkled grey except towards the costa and with dark grey markings. There is a short very oblique mark from the base of the costa and there are three oblong or subquadrate blotclies separated by narrow irregular cloudy interspaces occupying the dorsal half of the wing, the first narrower, hardly reaching the base, the third broadest, nearly reaching the termen, convex posteriorly. A very oblique line is found from the disc at one-fifth running to the upper anterior angle of the second and there is a short oblique line from the costa at one-fourth, as well as an irregular spot of cloudy grey suffusion in the disc above the middle. There are oblique lines from the costa at the middle and four-fifths, limiting the third blotch, and connected above the middle by an irregular streak. There are also six black terminal dots. The hindwings are light grey, the base whitish suffused and the costa expanded on the anterior half, a light grey subcostal hair-pencil extending from the base to three-fourths, the costa beyond this and the apex narrowly suffused whitish, with two dark grey dots on the apical edge.
