= Ethmia papiella =

Scientific classification
- Kingdom: Animalia
- Phylum: Arthropoda
- Clade: Pancrustacea
- Class: Insecta
- Order: Lepidoptera
- Family: Depressariidae
- Genus: Ethmia
- Species: E. papiella

Binomial name
- Ethmia papiella Powell, 1973

Species of moth

Ethmia papiella is a moth in the family Depressariidae. It is found in the Sinaloan thorn forest on the west coast of Mexico.

The length of the forewings is 6.7–8.7 mm (0.26–0.34 in). The ground color of the forewings is gray, overlaid with whitish in varying intensity. There is a series of longitudinal black streaks. The ground color of the hindwings is whitish basally, becoming pale grayish distally. The costal area under the hair pencil is gray.
