= Antaeotricha walchiana =

Scientific classification
- Kingdom: Animalia
- Phylum: Arthropoda
- Clade: Pancrustacea
- Class: Insecta
- Order: Lepidoptera
- Family: Depressariidae
- Genus: Antaeotricha
- Species: A. walchiana

Binomial name
- Antaeotricha walchiana (Stoll, [1782])

Synonyms
- Phalaena walchiana Stoll, [1782]; Tinea dorsella Fabricius, 1787; Pyralis griseana Fabricius, 1787; Tinea dorsella Fabricius, 1794; Cryptolechia lativittella Walker, 1864; Cryptolechia suppressella Walker, 1864; Antaeotricha glaciata Meyrick, 1909; Antaeotricha carphitis Meyrick, 1912; Antaeotricha dynastis Meyrick, 1915; Antaeotricha ampherista Meyrick, 1925; Antaeotricha forsteri Amsel, 1956

Species of moth

Antaeotricha walchiana is a moth of the family Depressariidae. It is found in Venezuela, Panama, Trinidad, Colombia, French Guiana, Brazil (Para, Santa Catharina), Bolivia and Peru.

The wingspan is about 24 mm. The forewings are white with the basal area tinged with pale ochreous and grey, terminated on the costa by an oblique dark grey spot before one-third. There is a dark grey semi-oval blotch extending along the dorsum from near the base to near the tornus, reaching in the middle nearly half across the wing, the upper edge with a ferruginous-brown projection before the middle, the discal area tinged with pale ochreous beyond this. There is a pale grey oblique spot from the costa before the middle, connected on the costa with a grey streak from the middle of the costa to beneath the costa at four-fifths with a dark brown transverse blotch from the tornus reaching two-thirds across the wing, preceded and followed by ochreous-grey suffusion. There is a confluent series of small ferruginous-brown spots before the termen, obsolete at the apex, but with a small brownish spot above it. The hindwings are grey, whitish in the cell and along the costa. There is a slender grey hair-pencil extending beneath the costa from the base to the middle and the costa has very long projecting rough grey scales from the base to beyond the middle.
