= Antaeotricha sparganota =

Scientific classification
- Domain: Eukaryota
- Kingdom: Animalia
- Phylum: Arthropoda
- Class: Insecta
- Order: Lepidoptera
- Family: Depressariidae
- Genus: Antaeotricha
- Species: A. sparganota

Binomial name
- Antaeotricha sparganota Meyrick, 1915

Species of moth

Antaeotricha sparganota is a moth of the family Depressariidae first described by Edward Meyrick in 1915. It is found in Guyana.

The wingspan is 20–21 mm. The forewings are white with pale greyish-ochreous markings. There is a spot on the base of the costa, partially confluent with an irregular streak from the costa at one-fourth, reaching halfway across the wing, its lower portion forming an infuscated angular projection posteriorly. A curved irregular fascia is found from the middle of the costa to the dorsum before the tornus, the costal extremity very narrow. There is also some faint suffusion along the dorsum and a rather narrow terminal fascia, separated from the preceding fascia by a line of white ground colour, before which there is some ochreous suffusion on the costa. There is more or less undefined pale ochreous suffusion in the disc and the second discal stigma is dark fuscous. A dark fuscous mark is found on the dorsum at three-fourths, with a dark fuscous costal dot above it. The hindwings are whitish, tinged with grey posteriorly and with the costal margin expanded from the base to two-thirds, with rough projecting whitish hairscales suffused with grey towards their base, and with a long subcostal pencil of yellow-whitish hairs lying beneath the forewings.
