= Antaeotricha monosaris =

Scientific classification
- Kingdom: Animalia
- Phylum: Arthropoda
- Class: Insecta
- Order: Lepidoptera
- Family: Depressariidae
- Genus: Antaeotricha
- Species: A. monosaris

Binomial name
- Antaeotricha monosaris (Meyrick, 1915)

Synonyms
- Stenoma monosaris Meyrick, 1915

Species of moth

Antaeotricha monosaris is a moth of the family Depressariidae. It is found in Guyana, French Guiana and Brazil.

The wingspan is about 15 mm. The forewings are white, in females slightly sprinkled with dark fuscous. The dorsal half is dark fuscous throughout, slightly wider on the posterior third, not quite reaching the termen at the upper edge. There is a dark fuscous line from the base of the costa, not quite reaching a dark fuscous longitudinal mark in the disc at one-third, as well as very oblique rather dark fuscous lines from just beneath the costa at one-fifth and two-fifths, variable in development and the first sometimes little marked, but neither reaching the dark dorsal area. An almost straight dark fuscous line is found from three-fourths of the costa to the extremity of the dark fuscous area and there are seven large blackish marginal dots around the apex and termen, those at the apex in females preceded by some dark fuscous suffusion. The hindwings are whitish, sometimes variably suffused with pale greyish posteriorly except at the apex, in females pale grey. The apical margin marked with dark fuscous on each side of the apex. In males, there is a long whitish hair-pencil enclosed in a subdorsal fold.
