= Antaeotricha triplintha =

Scientific classification
- Domain: Eukaryota
- Kingdom: Animalia
- Phylum: Arthropoda
- Class: Insecta
- Order: Lepidoptera
- Family: Depressariidae
- Genus: Antaeotricha
- Species: A. triplintha

Binomial name
- Antaeotricha triplintha (Meyrick, 1916)

Synonyms
- Aphanoxena triplintha Meyrick, 1916; Alphanoxena triplintha

Species of moth

Antaeotricha triplintha is a species of moth of the family Depressariidae. It is found in French Guiana.

The wingspan is about 15 mm. The forewings are shining white with dark fuscous markings. There is a short dash at the base above the middle and three suboblong dorsal blotches reaching half across the wing, extending from the base to the tornus with only narrow spaces between them. A rather upcurved line is found from beyond the basal dash to the upper anterior angle of the second blotch and there is a short oblique mark beneath costa at one-fourth and a small elongate spot in the disc before the middle, as well as a rather irregular line from the middle of the costa to the upper anterior angle of the third blotch, and a hardly curved line from three-fourths of the costa to its upper posterior angle. There are five rather large marginal dots around the apex and termen, with a small suffused spot before the apex. The hindwings are pale grey, whitish-tinged towards the base, darker towards the apex, the extreme apex whitish marked with dark fuscous on the margin. The costa is slightly expanded on the basal two-thirds and roughened with white scales, with long grey-whitish subcostal hair-pencil from the base lying beneath the forewings.
