= Antaeotricha thylacosaris =

Scientific classification
- Kingdom: Animalia
- Phylum: Arthropoda
- Clade: Pancrustacea
- Class: Insecta
- Order: Lepidoptera
- Family: Depressariidae
- Genus: Antaeotricha
- Species: A. thylacosaris

Binomial name
- Antaeotricha thylacosaris (Meyrick, 1915)

Synonyms
- Stenoma thylacosaris Meyrick, 1915

Species of moth

Antaeotricha thylacosaris is a species of moth of the family Depressariidae. It is found in Guyana, French Guiana and Brazil.

The wingspan is 17–21 mm. The forewings are whitish-fuscous, the extreme costal edge white and the dorsal three-fifths unevenly suffused with brownish. There is a slender dark fuscous longitudinal streak from the base of the costa to one-fourth of the disc and there are three dark fuscous transverse lines from beneath the costal edge, the first from one-fifth of the costa to before the middle of the dorsum, interrupted above and below an oval spot in the disc, becoming a broad suffusion in the dorsal area, the second from before the middle of the costa to three-fourths of the dorsum, curved, rather broadly suffused posteriorly towards the dorsum, the third from three-fourths of the costa to the tornus, rather strongly curved. There are eight blackish marginal marks around the apex and termen, connected by a dark brown line with projections on the veins. The hindwings are ochreous-whitish, the apical half suffused with grey. In males with a long ochreous-whitish hair-pencil enclosed in a subdorsal fold.
