= Antaeotricha pactota =

Scientific classification
- Domain: Eukaryota
- Kingdom: Animalia
- Phylum: Arthropoda
- Class: Insecta
- Order: Lepidoptera
- Family: Depressariidae
- Genus: Antaeotricha
- Species: A. pactota

Binomial name
- Antaeotricha pactota Meyrick, 1915

Species of moth

Antaeotricha pactota is a moth of the family Depressariidae. The species was first described by Edward Meyrick in 1915. It is found in Guyana and Pará, Brazil.

The wingspan is 17–18 mm. The forewings are white with an irregular oblique transverse dark grey patch from the costa at one-fourth, reaching halfway across the wing, widest on the costa and narrowly produced along the costa towards the base. There is a faint greyish spot above middle of the disc, and a hardly traceable transverse mark above the middle of the dorsum. There are two dark fuscous dots transversely placed on the end of the cell and a dark grey fascia more or less mixed and broken with white suffusion from three-fourths of the costa to the dorsum before the tornus and there are some dark grey sprinkles towards the apical part of the costa and termen. There are four or five, sometimes connected, small dark fuscous pre-marginal spots around the apex. The hindwings are ochreous whitish, tinged with grey towards the apex and along the termen. The costal margin is expanded on the basal half, with long rough projecting hairscales suffused with dark grey beneath, and a long subcostal pencil of whitish-ochreous hairs lying beneath the forewings.
