= Antaeotricha leptogramma =

Scientific classification
- Domain: Eukaryota
- Kingdom: Animalia
- Phylum: Arthropoda
- Class: Insecta
- Order: Lepidoptera
- Family: Depressariidae
- Genus: Antaeotricha
- Species: A. leptogramma

Binomial name
- Antaeotricha leptogramma (Meyrick, 1916)

Synonyms
- Psephomeres leptogramma Meyrick, 1916

Species of moth

Antaeotricha leptogramma is a moth of the family Depressariidae. It is found in French Guiana.

The wingspan is about 22 mm for males and 30 mm for females. The forewings are glossy slaty-grey with the costal edge white and all veins marked with fine white lines, faint or obsolete on the anterior two-fifths of the wing, beyond the cell with the interneural spaces paler and whitish-tinged, but the veins margined with dark grey lines. The hindwings are grey with costal hairscales suffused with darker grey beneath and with the subcostal hair-pencil white.
