= Antaeotricha mesostrota =

Scientific classification
- Domain: Eukaryota
- Kingdom: Animalia
- Phylum: Arthropoda
- Class: Insecta
- Order: Lepidoptera
- Family: Depressariidae
- Genus: Antaeotricha
- Species: A. mesostrota

Binomial name
- Antaeotricha mesostrota Meyrick, 1912

Species of moth

Antaeotricha mesostrota is a species of moth of the family Depressariidae. It is found in Guyana, French Guiana, Brazil and Venezuela.

The wingspan is 17–21 mm. The forewings are white with a patch of pale grey suffusion on the basal third of the costa, reaching half across the wing, the posterior edge irregularly prominent in the disc, the costal edge dark grey, the plical stigma small and dark grey, forming the angle of this patch. The second discal stigma is large and blackish and there is an oblique fuscous fascia crossing the wing beyond this, darkest on the costal edge. There is some fuscous irroration towards the apex and a series of blackish marginal dots around the apex and termen. The hindwings are fuscous-whitish, more fuscous-tinged posteriorly and a whitish-ochreous hair-pencil extending in the disc through the cell from the base to two-thirds. The costa is roughened with short projecting grey scales from near the base to near the middle.
