= Antaeotricha phaeosaris =

Scientific classification
- Domain: Eukaryota
- Kingdom: Animalia
- Phylum: Arthropoda
- Class: Insecta
- Order: Lepidoptera
- Family: Depressariidae
- Genus: Antaeotricha
- Species: A. phaeosaris

Binomial name
- Antaeotricha phaeosaris Meyrick, 1915

Species of moth

Antaeotricha phaeosaris is a species of moth of the family Depressariidae. It is found in French Guiana and Guyana.

The wingspan is about 22 mm. The forewings are grey, with a faint violet tinge and with a basal patch of irregular transverse dark fuscous markings, the edge running from one-third of the costa to two-fifths of the dorsum, convex. A narrow patch of whitish suffusion is found along the costa from this to beyond the middle and there is some dark fuscous and whitish sprinkling about the lower margin of the cell in the disc, as well as an oblique-oval blackish fuscous spot in the disc at two-thirds. Beyond these markings, the apical two-fifths of the wing is irregularly marked and suffused with dark fuscous, with a cloudy whitish line from three-fourths of the costa to the tornus, slightly indented beneath the costa. The dorsal scale-projection at one-third is tipped with ferruginous-orange. The hindwings are rather dark grey, with the costa expanded from the base to three-fourths and with rough projecting whitish scales suffused with dark grey beneath towards the middle, with a long whitish subcostal hair-pencil from the base in the groove and a long grey hair-pencil between this and the costa, lying beneath the forewings.
