= Gonioterma crocoptila =

Scientific classification
- Kingdom: Animalia
- Phylum: Arthropoda
- Class: Insecta
- Order: Lepidoptera
- Family: Depressariidae
- Genus: Gonioterma
- Species: G. crocoptila

Binomial name
- Gonioterma crocoptila (Meyrick, 1915)

Synonyms
- Stenoma crocoptila Meyrick, 1915

Species of moth

Gonioterma crocoptila is a moth of the family Depressariidae. It is found in Guyana.

The wingspan is about 16 mm. The forewings are whitish fuscous with the costal edge whitish ochreous. The stigmata are dark fuscous, the plical midway between the discal. There are subtriangular dark fuscous spots on the costa at the middle and four-fifths, from the latter a curved series of dark fuscous dots runs to the dorsum before the tornus. There is also a marginal series of blackish dots around the apex and termen. The hindwings are ochreous whitish with a long rather deep ochreous-yellow hair-pencil lying along the dorsum from the base.
