= Antaeotricha laudata =

Scientific classification
- Domain: Eukaryota
- Kingdom: Animalia
- Phylum: Arthropoda
- Class: Insecta
- Order: Lepidoptera
- Family: Depressariidae
- Genus: Antaeotricha
- Species: A. laudata

Binomial name
- Antaeotricha laudata Meyrick, 1916

Species of moth

Antaeotricha laudata is a species of moth of the family Depressariidae. It is found in French Guiana, Brazil and Bolivia.

The wingspan is 21–23 mm (0.83–0.91 in). The forewings are white with a pale violet-grey basal patch suffusedly marked with dark purple-fuscous, occupying about one-third of the wing, the edge slightly oblique, with a strong fulvous-brown mark from the dorsum. There are some faint grey markings on the dorsal half beyond this, and a dark grey spot on the dorsum at two-thirds, as well as two dark grey dots transversely placed at the end of the cell. A somewhat curved rather irregular grey or dark grey line is found from the costa beyond the middle to the dorsum before the tornus, sometimes interrupted and there is also a straight oblique grey shade terminating in the tornus not reaching the costa. A triangular grey spot occupies the upper two-thirds of the termen. The hindwings are light grey, more or less suffused with whitish on the basal half, the costa expanded from the base to two-thirds, with a strong broad projection of rough hairscales suffused with dark grey beneath, and a long pale ochreous subcostal hair-pencil lying in a prismatic groove suffused with fuscous at the base concealed by the forewings.
