= Antaeotricha oxydecta =

Scientific classification
- Domain: Eukaryota
- Kingdom: Animalia
- Phylum: Arthropoda
- Class: Insecta
- Order: Lepidoptera
- Family: Depressariidae
- Genus: Antaeotricha
- Species: A. oxydecta

Binomial name
- Antaeotricha oxydecta (Meyrick, 1915)

Synonyms
- Stenoma oxydecta Meyrick, 1915

Species of moth

Antaeotricha oxydecta is a moth of the family Depressariidae. It is found in Guyana.

The wingspan is 19–20 mm. The forewings are reddish-fuscous with a broad whitish streak, slightly tinged with reddish-ochreous, extending along the costa from the base to near the apex, suffused beneath. The second discal stigma is slightly darker fuscous and obscure and there are eight dark fuscous marginal dots around the posterior part of the costa and termen. The hindwings are ochreous-whitish with the costal margin expanded from the base to two-thirds, where it is abruptly and acutely incised. The forewings beneath have a downwards-directed fringe of long whitish hairs from the lower margin of the cell, and a long whitish subdorsal hair-pencil from the base lying beneath the hindwings.
