= Antaeotricha oxycentra =

Scientific classification
- Domain: Eukaryota
- Kingdom: Animalia
- Phylum: Arthropoda
- Class: Insecta
- Order: Lepidoptera
- Family: Depressariidae
- Genus: Antaeotricha
- Species: A. oxycentra

Binomial name
- Antaeotricha oxycentra Meyrick, 1916

Species of moth

Antaeotricha oxycentra is a moth of the family Depressariidae. It is found in the Guianas and Brazil.

The wingspan is about 16 mm. The forewings are whitish, slightly ochreous-tinged in the disc and with an elongate dark purple-grey blotch marked with black and ochreous-brown along the basal third of the dorsum, reaching the costa at the base. There is a suffused grey mark on the dorsum just beyond this and an irregularly dentate somewhat interrupted dark grey line from one-fourth of the costa to beyond the middle of the dorsum, as well as two triangular black dots transversely placed on the end of the cell, and a triangular black spot on the dorsum beneath these, its apex somewhat produced and nearly touching the lower. A suffused violet-grey mark is found on the costa above these dots, and a bar in the disc beyond them. There is an indistinct violet-grey line from four-fifths of the costa to the tornus, somewhat sinuate near the costa and an indistinct violet-grey mark composed of four small confluent spots just before the apex and upper part of the termen, leaving a waved, white terminal line. The hindwings are grey, thinly scaled towards the base and with the costa expanded from the base to two-thirds, with a broad projection of long rough hairscales suffused with dark grey beneath, and a long whitish subcostal hair-pencil from the base lying beneath the forewings.
