= Antaeotricha pythonaea =

Scientific classification
- Domain: Eukaryota
- Kingdom: Animalia
- Phylum: Arthropoda
- Class: Insecta
- Order: Lepidoptera
- Family: Depressariidae
- Genus: Antaeotricha
- Species: A. pythonaea

Binomial name
- Antaeotricha pythonaea Meyrick, 1916

Species of moth

Antaeotricha pythonaea is a moth of the family Depressariidae. It is found in French Guiana.

The wingspan is about 22 mm. The forewings are deep shining bronze-green, with suffused light indigo-bluish markings, consisting of irregular suffusion in the basal and median portions of the discal and dorsal areas, a transverse streak between these rising from a flattened-triangular ochreous-white spot on the costa before the middle, and a transverse streak from beneath the costa at three-fourths to the tornus. A leaden-grey line is found around the apex and termen. The hindwings are dark fuscous with the costa rather expanded from the base to two-thirds, with a broad projection of ochreous-whitish scales before the middle, and a long whitish subcostal hair-pencil from the base lying beneath the forewings.
