= Antaeotricha superciliosa =

Scientific classification
- Kingdom: Animalia
- Phylum: Arthropoda
- Class: Insecta
- Order: Lepidoptera
- Family: Depressariidae
- Genus: Antaeotricha
- Species: A. superciliosa

Binomial name
- Antaeotricha superciliosa Meyrick, 1918

Species of moth

Antaeotricha superciliosa is a moth of the family Depressariidae. It is found in French Guiana and Brazil.

The wingspan is about 23 mm. The forewings are ochreous-whitish or pale whitish-ochreous, with a broad dorsal band of irregular greyish or light fuscous suffusion occupying nearly half the wing and with the costa narrowly pale ochreous. There is an elongate patch of roughly raised hairscales extending in the disc from near the base to near the middle, between this and the costal streak several irregularly placed blackish-grey dashes. There are obscure streaks of fuscous and dark fuscous scales between the veins on the posterior half of the wing, terminating in dark fuscous dots around the apex and termen. The hindwings are whitish, the costal area expanded and fringed with rough scales on the basal half and with a patch of projecting scales at three-fourths, both these areas suffused dark grey beneath, above with a long ochreous-whitish subcostal hair-pencil from the base reaching to three-fourths.
