= Antaeotricha xylocosma =

Scientific classification
- Domain: Eukaryota
- Kingdom: Animalia
- Phylum: Arthropoda
- Class: Insecta
- Order: Lepidoptera
- Family: Depressariidae
- Genus: Antaeotricha
- Species: A. xylocosma

Binomial name
- Antaeotricha xylocosma Meyrick, 1916

Species of moth

Antaeotricha xylocosma is a moth of the family Depressariidae. It is found in French Guiana.

The wingspan is about 27 mm. The forewings are dark fuscous, slightly sprinkled with whitish, beneath the costa forming several small very indistinct cloudy whitish spots. There is a pale brownish-ochreous curved transverse-linear mark beneath the costa at one-fifth. The discal stigmata are cloudy and blackish, each with an indistinct brownish-ochreous dot adjacent beneath. The hindwings are dark fuscous, the costa expanded from the base to three-fifths, with long rough projecting scales suffused with brown beneath, and a long whitish subcostal hair-pencil from the base lying beneath the forewings.
