= Gonioterma linteata =

Scientific classification
- Kingdom: Animalia
- Phylum: Arthropoda
- Class: Insecta
- Order: Lepidoptera
- Family: Depressariidae
- Genus: Gonioterma
- Species: G. linteata

Binomial name
- Gonioterma linteata (Meyrick, 1916)

Synonyms
- Stenoma linteata Meyrick, 1916

Species of moth

Gonioterma linteata is a moth of the family Depressariidae. The species was first described by Edward Meyrick in 1916. It is found in French Guiana.

The wingspan is 21–22 mm. The forewings are whitish, with very faint fuscous tinge and with the costal edge whiter. The stigmata are small and dark fuscous, the plical very obliquely beyond the first discal. There are some scattered dark fuscous scales indicating a faint irregular postmedian line and small blackish spots on the costa at the middle and four-fifths, the second sending a curved row of blackish dots to the dorsum before the tornus. A marginal row of blackish dots is found around the apex and termen. The hindwings are whitish, with the dorsum expanded to form a fold containing a long whitish-ochreous hair-pencil from the base.
