= Rectiostoma xuthobasis =

Scientific classification
- Domain: Eukaryota
- Kingdom: Animalia
- Phylum: Arthropoda
- Class: Insecta
- Order: Lepidoptera
- Family: Depressariidae
- Genus: Rectiostoma
- Species: R. xuthobasis

Binomial name
- Rectiostoma xuthobasis (Duckworth, 1971)

Synonyms
- Setiostoma xuthobasis Duckworth, 1971

Species of moth

Rectiostoma xuthobasis is a moth in the family Depressariidae. It was described by W. Donald Duckworth in 1971. It is found in Colombia.

The wingspan is 18–19 mm. The forewings are yellow suffused with darker yellow scales basally, concolorous and continuous with the thorax and tegulae. There are a few light brown scales in the anal area. The distal margin of the yellow area is bordered by a dark brown line immediately paralleled by a broad, transverse band of iridescent blue violet. The apical half of the forewing is dark brown suffused with iridescent copper scales irregularly patterned with iridescent blue-violet scales. The hindwings are dark brown with a white patch on the anterior margin and white and brown hair-pencils in the anal area.
