= Antaeotricha thesmophora =

Scientific classification
- Domain: Eukaryota
- Kingdom: Animalia
- Phylum: Arthropoda
- Class: Insecta
- Order: Lepidoptera
- Family: Depressariidae
- Genus: Antaeotricha
- Species: A. thesmophora

Binomial name
- Antaeotricha thesmophora Meyrick, 1915

Species of moth

Antaeotricha thesmophora is a moth of the family Depressariidae. It is found in Guyana.

The wingspan is 18–20 mm. The forewings are white with dark fuscous-grey markings. There is an oblique blotch from the base of the costa to the fold and an irregular transverse streak at one-fourth, interrupted in the disc. A small spot is found beneath the fold before the middle, and two small cloudy spots are found on the dorsum towards the middle. There are two small spots on the costa before and beyond two-thirds, and two transversely placed at the end of the cell. A transverse blotch extends from beyond these to the dorsum before the tornus and there is an irregular almost apical spot. The hindwings are grey with the costal margin expanded to beyond the middle, with long rough projecting hairscales suffused with dark grey beneath, and a long whitish subcostal hair-pencil lying beneath the forewings.
