= Rectiostoma cirrhobasis =

Scientific classification
- Domain: Eukaryota
- Kingdom: Animalia
- Phylum: Arthropoda
- Class: Insecta
- Order: Lepidoptera
- Family: Depressariidae
- Genus: Rectiostoma
- Species: R. cirrhobasis

Binomial name
- Rectiostoma cirrhobasis (Duckworth, 1971)

Synonyms
- Setiostoma cirrhobasis Duckworth, 1971

Species of moth

Rectiostoma cirrhobasis is a moth in the family Depressariidae. It was described by W. Donald Duckworth in 1971. It is found in the humid low highlands of Guatemala and El Salvador.

The wingspan is 11–15 mm. The forewings are yellow basally, concolorous and continuous with the thorax and tegula. The distal margin of the yellow area is bordered by a dark brown line immediately paralleled by a broad, transverse band of iridescent blue-violet scales. The hindwings are dark brown with a white patch on the anterior margin, some white scaling and white hair-pencils in the anal area near the base.
