= Antaeotricha semiovata =

Scientific classification
- Kingdom: Animalia
- Phylum: Arthropoda
- Clade: Pancrustacea
- Class: Insecta
- Order: Lepidoptera
- Family: Depressariidae
- Genus: Antaeotricha
- Species: A. semiovata

Binomial name
- Antaeotricha semiovata Meyrick, 1926

Species of moth

Antaeotricha semiovata is a moth of the family Depressariidae. It is found in Colombia.

The wingspan is about 29 mm. The forewings are white with a grey cloud on the costa at one-fifth, three or four irregular shades crossing the dorsal half anteriorly, with five small cloudy spots in the disc from the middle to near the termen, and a larger spot on the tornus. There is a semi-oval dark grey blotch occupying the median area of the dorsum, crossed in the middle by a faint dentate line of whitish irroration. The hindwings are whitish-grey with the costa expanded on the anterior half, with a dense projecting fringe of grey hairscales tipped white, with a rather short white subcostal hair-pencil from the base not reaching the middle.
