= Antaeotricha compsographa =

Scientific classification
- Domain: Eukaryota
- Kingdom: Animalia
- Phylum: Arthropoda
- Class: Insecta
- Order: Lepidoptera
- Family: Depressariidae
- Genus: Antaeotricha
- Species: A. compsographa

Binomial name
- Antaeotricha compsographa Meyrick, 1916

Species of moth

Antaeotricha compsographa is a moth of the family Depressariidae. It was described by Edward Meyrick in 1916. It is endemic to French Guiana.

The wingspan is 19–20 millimetres (0.75–0.79 in). The forewings are brown sprinkled with blackish and with the markings white, very irregularly margined with variable blackish suffusion. There is some marking at the base, and an irregular interrupted oblique transverse line at one-fifth, as well as a zigzag oblique transverse line before the middle, from which a narrow streak runs along the lower margin of the cell to a dark fuscous dot at its angle, beyond this extended as a fan of suffused white lines along veins 2-5 nearly to the subterminal line. There is some irregular marking towards the costa beyond the middle and dorsum before the tornus, the veins posteriorly marked with blackish streaks, interrupted by a fine curved subterminal line slightly indented near the costa. There is also a terminal series of white marks. The hindwings are light grey, the basal half suffused with whitish. The costa is rather expanded from the base to four-fifths, with rough scales on the edge partially suffused with grey beneath, and a long whitish subcostal hair-pencil from the base lying beneath the forewings.
