= Antaeotricha pellocoma =

Scientific classification
- Domain: Eukaryota
- Kingdom: Animalia
- Phylum: Arthropoda
- Class: Insecta
- Order: Lepidoptera
- Family: Depressariidae
- Genus: Antaeotricha
- Species: A. pellocoma

Binomial name
- Antaeotricha pellocoma (Meyrick, 1915)

Synonyms
- Aphanoxena pellocoma Meyrick, 1915

Species of moth

Antaeotricha pellocoma is a moth of the family Depressariidae. It is found in French Guiana, Guyana, Brazil and Bolivia.

The wingspan is about 16 mm. The forewings are white with two blackish dots transversely placed on the end of the cell and a grey quadrate blotch extending from these to the termen and reaching the dorsum but not the costa, becoming dark grey towards the termen, and crossed anteriorly by a faint whitish shade and posteriorly by a fine white line denticulate towards the tornus. The hindwings are white, suffused with light grey on the apical third and with a long whitish subcostal hair-pencil lying beneath the forewings.
