= Antaeotricha reprehensa =

Scientific classification
- Kingdom: Animalia
- Phylum: Arthropoda
- Class: Insecta
- Order: Lepidoptera
- Family: Depressariidae
- Genus: Antaeotricha
- Species: A. reprehensa

Binomial name
- Antaeotricha reprehensa Meyrick, 1926

Synonyms
- Antaeotricha acrobapta Meyrick, 1933

Species of moth

Antaeotricha reprehensa is a species of moth of the family Depressariidae. It is found in Brazil (Rio Grande do Sul) and Argentina. Notice that the Argentinian record refers to Antaeotricha acrobapta, which is considered a valid species by the Global Lepidoptera Index.

The wingspan is 18–22 mm. The forewings are ochreous-white with irregular blackish marbling on the basal fourth of the dorsal area, and a transverse strigula towards the costa near the base. There is a grey transverse strigula beneath the costa at one-fourth and a blotch of three suffused grey sinuate shades occupying the median third of the dorsal area, followed by a dark fuscous shade expanded on the dorsum, a grey transverse strigula in the disc above the first of these and two transversely placed nearly confluent black marks on the end of the cell. There is an irregular grey shade from the costa beyond the middle forming a loop beyond these and terminating in the apex of the dark fuscous shade. A grey spot is found on the costa at three-fourths, from beneath this a pale ochreous-grey slightly curved shade to the dorsum before the tornus. There is also a slightly curved whitish-ochreous shade from beneath the costa near the apex to the tornus, becoming greyish on the lower half. The hindwings are ochreous-whitish with the costa rather expanded on the anterior half, with a broad antemedian projection of dark grey hairscales tipped white. There is an ochieous-whitish subcostal hair-pencil from the base to beyond the middle.
