= Gonioterma notifera =

Scientific classification
- Kingdom: Animalia
- Phylum: Arthropoda
- Class: Insecta
- Order: Lepidoptera
- Family: Depressariidae
- Genus: Gonioterma
- Species: G. notifera

Binomial name
- Gonioterma notifera (Meyrick, 1915)

Synonyms
- Stenoma notifera Meyrick, 1915

Species of moth

Gonioterma notifera is a moth of the family Depressariidae. It is found in Paraguay.

The wingspan is about 18 mm. The forewings are ochreous whitish with a very small dark fuscous spot on the costa at one-fourth, a moderate rounded-triangular one in the middle, and a larger one at three-fourths. The plical stigma is minute and dark fuscous and the second discal is small. There are six dark fuscous marginal dots around the apex and upper part of the termen, the apical one largest. The hindwings are ochreous whitish with a moderate whitish-ochreous hair-pencil lying along the dorsum from the base.
