= Antaeotricha illepida =

Scientific classification
- Domain: Eukaryota
- Kingdom: Animalia
- Phylum: Arthropoda
- Class: Insecta
- Order: Lepidoptera
- Family: Depressariidae
- Genus: Antaeotricha
- Species: A. illepida

Binomial name
- Antaeotricha illepida Meyrick, 1916

Synonyms
- Antaeotricha martini Amsel, 1956

Species of moth

Antaeotricha illepida is a moth of the family Depressariidae. It was described by Edward Meyrick in 1916. It is found in French Guiana and Venezuela.

The wingspan is 20–21 millimetres (0.79–0.83 in). The forewings are ochreous white with a broad streak of fuscous suffusion occupying the dorsal half anteriorly but narrowed to a point at the tornus, on the basal third suffused with rather dark fuscous and reaching the costa at the base, towards the tornus also suffused with rather dark fuscous. There are two small rather dark fuscous spots transversely placed at the end of the cell and a rather irregular curved cloudy fuscous line from the costa beyond the middle to the end of the dorsal streak, sometimes obsolete on the costa. There is a somewhat oblique straight fuscous shade terminating in the tornus, not reaching the costa and a cloudy fuscous spot on the upper half of the termen. The hindwings are fuscous whitish or whitish fuscous, suffused with fuscous posteriorly, with the costa rather expanded from the base to two-thirds, with a projection of rough scales suffused with fuscous beneath, and a long ochreous-whitish hair-pencil becoming fuscous towards the base lying beneath the forewings.
