= Antaeotricha ptycta =

Scientific classification
- Domain: Eukaryota
- Kingdom: Animalia
- Phylum: Arthropoda
- Class: Insecta
- Order: Lepidoptera
- Family: Depressariidae
- Genus: Antaeotricha
- Species: A. ptycta

Binomial name
- Antaeotricha ptycta (Walsingham, 1912)

Synonyms
- Athleta ptycta Walsingham, 1912; Athleta cenotes Walsingham, 1912; Stenoma dryotechna Meyrick, 1915

Species of moth

Antaeotricha ptycta is a species of moth of the family Depressariidae. It is found in Guatemala, Panama, Ecuador, the West Indies and Guyana.

The wingspan is 18–19 mm. The forewings are brownish-fuscous with a broad undefined streak of whitish-ochreous suffusion extending over the costal third of the wing from the base to the middle and a narrow longitudinal dark fuscous streak from the base of the costa to one-fifth of the disc. There is an indistinct fuscous very oblique line beneath the costa from near the base to one-fourth and a dark fuscous dash towards the costa at one-third, as well as an oblique series of two or three short cloudy dark fuscous marks towards the costa in the middle. The discal stigmata are dark fuscous, the plical represented by some dark fuscous elongate suffusion on the fold between these. There is a slightly curved cloudy dark fuscous line from four-fifths of the costa to the tornus and eight blackish marginal dots or marks around the apex and termen. The hindwings are whitish, the apical half suffused with light grey. In males, there is an ochreous-whitish hair-pencil enclosed in a subdorsal fold.
