= Antaeotricha isochyta =

Scientific classification
- Domain: Eukaryota
- Kingdom: Animalia
- Phylum: Arthropoda
- Class: Insecta
- Order: Lepidoptera
- Family: Depressariidae
- Genus: Antaeotricha
- Species: A. isochyta

Binomial name
- Antaeotricha isochyta (Meyrick, 1915)

Synonyms
- Stenoma isochyta Meyrick, 1915

Species of moth

Antaeotricha isochyta is a species of moth of the family Depressariidae. It is found in Guyana.

The wingspan is about 17 mm. The forewings are light brownish, becoming whitish-ochreous towards the costa on the anterior half and with the costal edge white. There is a short dark fuscous dash near the base in the middle, and a small dark fuscous spot in the disc beyond this. Three cloudy dark fuscous transverse lines are found from beneath the costal edge, the first two irregular, the first from one-fifth of the costa to the middle of the dorsum, widely interrupted in the disc, suffused towards the dorsum, the second from the middle of the costa to three-fourths of the dorsum, bent in the middle, somewhat interrupted, marked with a distinct dark fuscous dot on the end of the cell, the third from three-fourths of the costa to the tornus, evenly and rather strongly curved. There are nine cloudy dark fuscous marginal marks around the costa posteriorly and the termen. The hindwings are whitish, the apical half suffused with pale grey and with a long pale greyish-ochreous hair-pencil enclosed in a subdorsal fold.
