= Antaeotricha bilinguis =

Scientific classification
- Kingdom: Animalia
- Phylum: Arthropoda
- Clade: Pancrustacea
- Class: Insecta
- Order: Lepidoptera
- Family: Depressariidae
- Genus: Antaeotricha
- Species: A. bilinguis

Binomial name
- Antaeotricha bilinguis (Meyrick, 1918)

Synonyms
- Stenoma bilinguis Meyrick, 1918

Species of moth in genus Antaeotricha

Antaeotricha bilinguis is a moth of the family Depressariidae. It is found in French Guiana.

The wingspan is about 17 mm (0.67 in). The forewings are shining ochreous-white with a dark fuscous dash from near the base above the middle and a dark fuscous dash along the basal portion of the dorsum, with some fuscous suffusion above it extending to the first blotch and two oblong dark fuscous dorsal blotches reaching half across the wing, the first slightly antemedian, with a backwards-oblique projection from the upper anterior angle, the second occupying the tornal third, some light fuscous dorsal suffusion between these. There is a dark fuscous mark above the middle of the disc, another between this and the upper anterior angle of the second blotch, and a nearly straight line from four-fifths of the costa running to its upper posterior angle. There is also a terminal series of six dark fuscous dots. The hindwings are ochreous-whitish with a pale whitish-ochreous expansible hairpencil from the base concealed within a dorsal folded lobe. There is also a grey hairpencil from the lower margin of the cell before the middle lying along the submedian fold and nearly reaching the termen.
