= Rectiostoma argyrobasis =

Scientific classification
- Kingdom: Animalia
- Phylum: Arthropoda
- Class: Insecta
- Order: Lepidoptera
- Family: Depressariidae
- Genus: Rectiostoma
- Species: R. argyrobasis

Binomial name
- Rectiostoma argyrobasis (Duckworth, 1971)

Synonyms
- Setiostoma argyrobasis Duckworth, 1971

Species of moth

Rectiostoma argyrobasis is a moth in the family Depressariidae. It was described by W. Donald Duckworth in 1971. It is found in the humid low highlands of northern Venezuela and south-eastern Brazil.

The wingspan is 14–16 mm. The forewings are white basally, tinged with yellow on the costal edge. The distal margin of the white area is bordered by a dark brown line immediately paralleled by a broad, transverse band of iridescent blue violet. The apical half of the forewing is dark brown suffused with iridescent bronze-to-violet scales. The hindwings are dark brown with a white patch on the anterior margin and white hair-pencils along the anal veins.
