= Antaeotricha melanarma =

Scientific classification
- Domain: Eukaryota
- Kingdom: Animalia
- Phylum: Arthropoda
- Class: Insecta
- Order: Lepidoptera
- Family: Depressariidae
- Genus: Antaeotricha
- Species: A. melanarma

Binomial name
- Antaeotricha melanarma Meyrick, 1916

Species of moth

Antaeotricha melanarma is a species of moth of the family Depressariidae. It is found in French Guiana.

The wingspan is 20–22 mm. The forewings are white with a fuscous basal dot above the middle and three or four fuscous marks near the base indicating an interrupted oblique line. The dorsal area beyond this has some vague pale fuscous suffusion, and with a rather dark fuscous suffused triangular blotch in the middle and larger quadrate blotch before the tornus reaching half across the wing. There is a fuscous line from beneath the costa at one-fifth, very acutely angulated first outwards and then inwards, running into the median dorsal blotch and a rather dark fuscous longitudinal line from the inward angle of this to near the end of the cell, and a shorter one beneath the posterior half of this. A short fuscous longitudinal mark is found above the middle of this and there is a line fuscous line beneath the costal edge from one-fifth to beyond the middle and there is an interrupted rather dark fuscous line from before the middle of the costa to the upper anterior angle of the pre-tornal blotch, and a slightly curved from two-thirds of the costa to its posterior angle. Some faint pale fuscous suffusion is found towards the costa posteriorly and at the termen and there are eight well-marked dark fuscous marginal dots around the apex and termen. The hindwings are grey, the base suffused with whitish and the apical edge whitish. The costa is expanded from the base to two-thirds, with long rough projecting hairscales broadly suffused with dark fuscous beneath, and a long whitish subcostal hair-pencil from the base lying beneath the forewings.
