= Lecithocera insidians =

Scientific classification
- Kingdom: Animalia
- Phylum: Arthropoda
- Class: Insecta
- Order: Lepidoptera
- Family: Lecithoceridae
- Genus: Lecithocera
- Species: L. insidians

Binomial name
- Lecithocera insidians Meyrick, 1918

Species of moth in the genus Lecithocera

Lecithocera insidians is a moth in the family Lecithoceridae. It was described by Edward Meyrick in 1918. It is found in southern India.

The wingspan is about 18 mm. The forewings are rather dark fuscous and the hindwings are grey with a small expansible greyish hair-pencil in a groove from beneath the base of the cell.
