= Antaeotricha lophoptycha =

Scientific classification
- Domain: Eukaryota
- Kingdom: Animalia
- Phylum: Arthropoda
- Class: Insecta
- Order: Lepidoptera
- Family: Depressariidae
- Genus: Antaeotricha
- Species: A. lophoptycha

Binomial name
- Antaeotricha lophoptycha (Meyrick, 1925)

Synonyms
- Stenoma lophoptycha Meyrick, 1925

Species of moth

Antaeotricha lophoptycha is a moth of the family Depressariidae. It is found in Brazil (Para).

The wingspan is about 17 mm. The forewings are white, the dorsal half tinged and irregularly irrorated fuscous. There is a subcostal groove from the base to two-fifths enclosing a white expansible hair-pencil and covered by a fringe of white scales. A short dark fuscous median dash is found near the base and there is a suffused dark fuscous oblique-elongate spot representing the first discal stigma, from before the middle of the dorsum a suffused dark fuscous triangular blotch extends towards this. The second discal stigma is dark fuscous, a faint oblique fuscous line from the middle of the costa to before this. There is an oblong dark fuscous blotch on the dorsum before the tornus, a nearly straight dark fuscous line from the costa at three-fourths running to the posterior angle of this. About seven dark fuscous marginal dots are found around the apex and termen. The hindwings are whitish, tinged grey posteriorly.
