= Gonioterma advocata =

Scientific classification
- Kingdom: Animalia
- Phylum: Arthropoda
- Class: Insecta
- Order: Lepidoptera
- Family: Depressariidae
- Genus: Gonioterma
- Species: G. advocata

Binomial name
- Gonioterma advocata (Meyrick, 1916)

Synonyms
- Stenoma advocata Meyrick, 1916

Species of moth

Gonioterma advocata is a moth of the family Depressariidae. It is found in French Guiana.

The wingspan is 25–26 mm. The forewings are lilac whitish, the costal edge white. The stigmata are dark fuscous, the plical and first discal small, the plical very obliquely posterior, the second discal moderate and transverse, with a cloudy sometimes divided small dark fuscous spot adjacent to it posteiiorly. There are scattered dark fuscous scales vaguely indicating a postmedian line and small dark fuscous spots on the costa at the middle and four-fifths, the second sending a strongly curved series of dark fuscous dots to the dorsum before the tornus. A marginal series of dark fuscous dots is found around the apex and termen. The hindwings are ochreous-grey whitish with a long dense whitish ochreous hair-pencil from the base lying in a subdorsal fold.
