= Antaeotricha thapsinopa =

Scientific classification
- Domain: Eukaryota
- Kingdom: Animalia
- Phylum: Arthropoda
- Class: Insecta
- Order: Lepidoptera
- Family: Depressariidae
- Genus: Antaeotricha
- Species: A. thapsinopa

Binomial name
- Antaeotricha thapsinopa Meyrick, 1916

Synonyms
- Antaeotricha clivosa Meyrick, 1918

Species of moth

Antaeotricha thapsinopa is a species of moth of the family Depressariidae. It is found in French Guiana.

The wingspan is 18–19 mm. The forewings are white with a small grey spot on the base of the costa, and a large elongate one on the base of the dorsum with beyond these an oblique series of three large grey spots followed by an irregular grey line running from one-fourth of the costa to the middle of the dorsum, succeeded on the dorsum by two cloudy adjacent spots, the first grey, the second triangular and deep ferruginous. There is a faint greyish spot in the middle of the disc, near beyond and above which is an oblique ochreous-yellow mark terminated beneath by a dark grey dot and there is a small faint grey transverse mark on the end of the cell, and a small cloudy grey spot beyond it. A somewhat curved irregular transverse grey shade terminates on the dorsum before the tornus, not reaching the costa and there is a grey shade composed of four small cloudy spots just before the termen. The hindwings are pale grey with the costa expanded from the base to three-fifths, with very long rough projecting whitish hairscales suffused beneath with dark grey towards the middle, with a moderate ochreous-whitish subcostal hair-pencil from the base of the lying beneath the forewings, and a fringe of ochreous-whitish hairs running from the middle of the cell to the upper angle.
