= Antaeotricha trichonota =

Scientific classification
- Kingdom: Animalia
- Phylum: Arthropoda
- Class: Insecta
- Order: Lepidoptera
- Family: Depressariidae
- Genus: Antaeotricha
- Species: A. trichonota

Binomial name
- Antaeotricha trichonota Meyrick, 1926

Species of moth

Antaeotricha trichonota is a species of moth of the family Depressariidae. It is found in Brazil (Rio Grande do Sul) and Paraguay.

The wingspan is 21–24 mm. The forewings are ochreous-whitish with a fuscous dot above the fold near the base and a short greyish-ochreous transverse streak from the costa beyond this. There is a transverse fuscous blotch from the costa at one-fifth reaching to the fold, suffused blackish on the lower edge and on the upper part of the anterior edge. The dorsal area to the fold is pale pinkish-ochreous, including a blackish dot at one-third, a transverse ferruginous shade beneath the middle of the wing, and limited by a fuscous dot on the fold preceding this, a ferruginous mark before the extremity, and a small triangular dark ferruginous spot at the apex. From above the dorsal edge from near the base to this spot a fringe of projecting whitish-ochreous hairscales is found, curved downwards. There is also a blackish dot beneath the costa beyond the middle, where a very oblique pale ochreous shade to the middle is continued by a curved series of dark grey dots to a small dark grey spot on the tornus. There is a pale ochreous curved shade near before the apex and termen. The hindwings are ochreous-whitish, beneath the dorsal fringe of the forewings a fringe of upwards-curved whitish-ochreous hairscales meeting it. The apical edge is whitish, preceded by a greyish tinge and the costal area is expanded on the basal two-thirds, with a projecting fringe of dense greyish-ochreous hairscales, and a long expansible ochreous-whitish subcostal hair-pencil from the base to beyond the middle.
