= Antaeotricha nitrota =

Scientific classification
- Domain: Eukaryota
- Kingdom: Animalia
- Phylum: Arthropoda
- Class: Insecta
- Order: Lepidoptera
- Family: Depressariidae
- Genus: Antaeotricha
- Species: A. nitrota

Binomial name
- Antaeotricha nitrota Meyrick, 1916

Species of moth

Antaeotricha nitrota is a moth of the family Depressariidae. It is found in French Guiana.

The wingspan is about 22 mm. The forewings are white with a rather dark fuscous basal blotch, its edge running from one-fourth of the costa to one-third of the dorsum, concave beneath the costa. There is a transverse patch of light grey suffusion beyond the middle extending from the disc to the dorsum, dorsally marked with dark fuscous on each margin. A dark grey transverse mark is found on the end of the cell and there is a small grey subdorsal spot beyond this, as well a grey shade from beyond the middle of the costa to the dorsum before the tornus, curved outwards on the lower half, somewhat interrupted above the middle. There is a grey line along the posterior half of the costa, dilated into a small suffused spot at three-fourths. A grey terminal fascia is narrowed downwards, leaving the terminal edge whitish. The hindwings are grey, lighter towards the base, the apical edge whitish and the costa expanded from the base to two-thirds, with a broad projection of long rough hairscales suffused with dark grey beneath, and a long dense whitish subcostal hair-pencil from the base lying beneath the forewings.
