= Antaeotricha tremulella =

Scientific classification
- Kingdom: Animalia
- Phylum: Arthropoda
- Class: Insecta
- Order: Lepidoptera
- Family: Depressariidae
- Genus: Antaeotricha
- Species: A. tremulella

Binomial name
- Antaeotricha tremulella (Walker, 1864)

Synonyms
- Cryptolechia tremulella Walker, 1864; Antaeotricha chelobathra Meyrick, 1916

Species of moth

Antaeotricha tremulella is a species of moth of the family Depressariidae. It is found in the Guianas and Brazil.

The wingspan is 25–26 mm. The forewings are white with three short blackish bars more or less suffused together with grey forming an elongate blotch along the basal fourth of the costa. There is a blackish-grey spot on the dorsum at one-third, with projecting dorsal scales beneath this ferruginous. Two or three indistinct dots of blackish-grey irroration are found in the disc on the basal third and there is some faint irregular greyish suffusion on the dorsal half of the median area and a blackish somewhat transverse dot on the end of the cell, as well as an irregular curved grey shade from beneath the costa beyond the middle to four-fifths of the dorsum and a dark grey spot on the costa beyond three-fourths. A somewhat curved grey shade is found from beneath this to the tornus, sometimes connected with the preceding shade by a vague pale greyish suffusion and there is a dark grey shade around the apex, rather thick above and attenuated downwards, not reaching the tornus. The hindwings are grey, more or less whitish-tinged near the base and with the costa expanded from the base to two-thirds, with long rough projecting hairscales suffused with blackish-grey beneath, and a long whitish subcostal hair-pencil from the base lying beneath the forewings.
