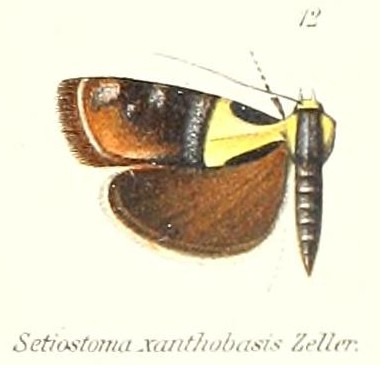
- "Rectiostoma xanthobasis"

Scientific classification
- Domain: Eukaryota
- Kingdom: Animalia
- Phylum: Arthropoda
- Class: Insecta
- Order: Lepidoptera
- Family: Depressariidae
- Subfamily: Stenomatinae
- Genus: Rectiostoma; Becker, 1982

Synonyms
- Setiostoma Felder & Rogenhofer, 1875; Setiostoma Zeller, 1875 (preocc. Felder & Rogenhofer, 1875)

= Rectiostoma =

Genus of moths

Rectiostoma is a moth genus of the family Depressariidae.

== Species ==
- Rectiostoma argyrobasis (Duckworth, 1971)
- Rectiostoma callidora (Meyrick, 1909)
- Rectiostoma chrysabasis (Duckworth, 1971)
- Rectiostoma cirrhobasis (Duckworth, 1971)
- Rectiostoma cnecobasis (Duckworth, 1971)
- Rectiostoma earobasis (Duckworth, 1971)
- Rectiostoma eusema (Walsingham, 1914)
- Rectiostoma fernaldella (Riley, 1889)
- Rectiostoma flaviceps (Felder & Rogenhofer, 1875)
- Rectiostoma flinti (Duckworth, 1971)
- Rectiostoma haemitheia (Felder & Rogenhofer, 1875)
- Rectiostoma leuconympha (Meyrick, 1921)
- Rectiostoma ochrobasis (Duckworth, 1971)
- Rectiostoma silvibasis (Duckworth, 1971)
- Rectiostoma thiobasis (Duckworth, 1971)
- Rectiostoma xanthobasis (Zeller, 1875)
- Rectiostoma xuthobasis (Duckworth, 1971)
