= Gonioterma pleonastes =

Scientific classification
- Kingdom: Animalia
- Phylum: Arthropoda
- Class: Insecta
- Order: Lepidoptera
- Family: Depressariidae
- Genus: Gonioterma
- Species: G. pleonastes

Binomial name
- Gonioterma pleonastes (Meyrick, 1915)

Synonyms
- Stenoma pleonastes Meyrick, 1915

Species of moth

Gonioterma pleonastes is a moth of the family Depressariidae. It is found in French Guiana.

The wingspan is about 23 mm. The forewings are light greyish ochreous with the costal edge ochreous yellowish and with a small oblique dark fuscous mark on the base of the costa. The subcostal area is broadly suffused with ochreous whitish on the anterior half, including a line blackish dash towards the base and a slender blackish streak along the fold from the base to the middle, terminated by the plical stigma. The first discal stigma is represented by an elongate blackish spot, the second by a blackish dot, the discal area around these irregularly marked with dark brown suffusion. The dorsum is broadly suffused with dark brown from the base to two-thirds and three dark brown costal spots, becoming blackish on the costal edge, the first at one-fourth is small and the second in the middle is somewhat larger, the third is found at four-fifths, where a curved series of cloudy fuscous dots runs to the dorsum before the tornus. There is a terminal series of blackish dots. The hindwings are grey.
