= Rectiostoma cnecobasis =

Scientific classification
- Domain: Eukaryota
- Kingdom: Animalia
- Phylum: Arthropoda
- Class: Insecta
- Order: Lepidoptera
- Family: Depressariidae
- Genus: Rectiostoma
- Species: R. cnecobasis

Binomial name
- Rectiostoma cnecobasis (Duckworth, 1971)

Synonyms
- Setiostoma cnecobasis Duckworth, 1971

Species of moth

Rectiostoma cnecobasis is a moth in the family Depressariidae. It was described by W. Donald Duckworth in 1971. It is found in the high highlands of Peru and Bolivia.

The wingspan is 11–13 mm. The forewings are pale yellow mixed with white basally, concolorous and continuous with the thorax and tegula. The distal margin of the yellow area is bordered by a dark brown line immediately paralleled by a broad, transverse band of iridescent violet. The apical half of the forewing is dark brown suffused with iridescent blue violet. There are iridescent green highlights scattered along the dorsum. The hindwings are dark brown with a white patch on the anterior margin.
