= Rectiostoma callidora =

Scientific classification
- Kingdom: Animalia
- Phylum: Arthropoda
- Class: Insecta
- Order: Lepidoptera
- Family: Depressariidae
- Genus: Rectiostoma
- Species: R. callidora

Binomial name
- Rectiostoma callidora (Meyrick, 1909)

Synonyms
- Setiostoma callidora Meyrick, 1909

Species of moth

Rectiostoma callidora is a moth in the family Depressariidae. It was described by Edward Meyrick in 1909. It is found in the humid low highlands of south-eastern Peru and north-western Bolivia.

The wingspan is 11–12 mm. The forewings are dark brown, with a bright yellow area occupying the basal fourth. The apical margin of the yellow area is straight edged with a dark brown line. The apical three fourths of the forewing have a broad, iridescent blue transverse band parallel to the distal margin of the yellow area. The outer third of the forewing is iridescent bronze to violet. The area between this and the preceding fascia is sprinkled with iridescent copper scales. The hindwings are dark brown with a white patch on the basal half of the anterior margin.
