= Rectiostoma haemitheia =

Scientific classification
- Kingdom: Animalia
- Phylum: Arthropoda
- Clade: Pancrustacea
- Class: Insecta
- Order: Lepidoptera
- Family: Depressariidae
- Genus: Rectiostoma
- Species: R. haemitheia

Binomial name
- Rectiostoma haemitheia (Felder & Rogenhofer, 1875)

Synonyms
- Setiostoma haemitheia Felder & Rogenhofer, 1875; Setiostoma chlorobasis Zeller, 1875; Setiostoma dietzi Duckworth, 1971

Species of moth

Rectiostoma haemitheia is a moth in the family Depressariidae. It was described by Cajetan Felder, Rudolf Felder and Alois Friedrich Rogenhofer in 1875. It is found in the humid low highlands of western Venezuela, central Colombia and Costa Rica. It has also been recorded from Panama and Brazil (Amazonas).

The wingspan is 11–15 mm. The forewings are yellow basally to just before the midpoint, the distal margin of the yellow area runs straight from the costa to the dorsum and is bordered by a dark brown line. The apical half of the forewing is dark brown with a broad transverse band parallel to the distal margin of the yellow area and a subterminal band from the costa before the apex to the tornus. There are irregular, iridescent blue to violet patches between two preceding fascia. The hindwings are dark brown with a white patch on the anterior margin.
