= Gonioterma expansa =

Scientific classification
- Kingdom: Animalia
- Phylum: Arthropoda
- Class: Insecta
- Order: Lepidoptera
- Family: Depressariidae
- Genus: Gonioterma
- Species: G. expansa

Binomial name
- Gonioterma expansa (Meyrick, 1915)

Synonyms
- Stenoma expansa Meyrick, 1915

Species of moth

Gonioterma expansa is a moth of the family Depressariidae. It is found in Brazil (Rio de Janeiro).

The wingspan is about 21 mm. The forewings are ochreous whitish with rather large triangular dark fuscous spots on the costa at the middle and three-fourths. The second discal stigma is small and dark fuscous. The hindwings are ochreous whitish, the dorsum with a group of long expansible ochreous-whitish hairs spreading over the abdomen, but not collected into a defined pencil.
