= Gonioterma bryophanes =

Scientific classification
- Kingdom: Animalia
- Phylum: Arthropoda
- Class: Insecta
- Order: Lepidoptera
- Family: Depressariidae
- Genus: Gonioterma
- Species: G. bryophanes

Binomial name
- Gonioterma bryophanes (Meyrick, 1915)

Synonyms
- Stenoma bryophanes Meyrick, 1915

Species of moth

Gonioterma bryophanes is a moth of the family Depressariidae. It is found in French Guiana.

The wingspan is 27–28 mm. The forewings are dull grey greenish, the anterior part of the disc suffused with dark greenish grey. There is a paler subcostal band with a whitish gloss. The plical stigma is blackish and there is a series of indistinct irregular short longitudinal marks of whitish irroration along the upper margin of the cell, and another series from above the posterior portion of this parallel with the costa to near the apex, then curved near the termen to below the middle. There are also six white almost marginal dots along the termen. The hindwings are grey, darker posteriorly.
