= Gonioterma conchita =

Scientific classification
- Domain: Eukaryota
- Kingdom: Animalia
- Phylum: Arthropoda
- Class: Insecta
- Order: Lepidoptera
- Family: Depressariidae
- Genus: Gonioterma
- Species: G. conchita

Binomial name
- Gonioterma conchita Busck, 1920

Synonyms
- Stenoma desidiosa Meyrick, 1925

Species of moth

Gonioterma conchita is a moth of the family Depressariidae. It is found in Guatemala and Colombia.

The wingspan is 26–27 mm. The forewings are light brownish, faintly violet tinged, the extreme costal edge whitish. The second discal stigma is fuscous, tending to be transversely double and there are undefined cloudy fuscous spots on the costa at the middle and three-fourths. There is a marginal series of rather dark fuscous dots around the posterior part of the costa and termen. The hindwings are pale ochreous yellowish.
