= Gonioterma phortax =

Scientific classification
- Kingdom: Animalia
- Phylum: Arthropoda
- Class: Insecta
- Order: Lepidoptera
- Family: Depressariidae
- Genus: Gonioterma
- Species: G. phortax

Binomial name
- Gonioterma phortax Meyrick, 1915

Synonyms
- Stenoma ochrosaris Meyrick, 1925

Species of moth

Gonioterma phortax is a moth of the family Depressariidae. It is found in Guyana, Venezuela and Brazil (Amazonas).

The wingspan is 15–20 mm. The forewings are whitish ochreous, slightly tinged with grey, in males more whitish towards the costa. There is a small dark fuscous spot on the costa beyond one-fourth, and somewhat larger semi-oval dark fuscous spots on the costa beyond the middle and at five-sixths, from latter a curved series of dark fuscous dots runs to the dorsum before the tornus. The stigmata are very small, dark fuscous, sometimes little marked, the plical very obliquely beyond the first discal. There is a terminal series of dark fuscous dots. The hindwings are pale whitish yellowish, in females, they are tinged with grey.
