= Rectiostoma silvibasis =

Scientific classification
- Domain: Eukaryota
- Kingdom: Animalia
- Phylum: Arthropoda
- Class: Insecta
- Order: Lepidoptera
- Family: Depressariidae
- Genus: Rectiostoma
- Species: R. silvibasis

Binomial name
- Rectiostoma silvibasis (Duckworth, 1971)

Synonyms
- Setiostoma silvibasis Duckworth, 1971

Species of moth

Rectiostoma silvibasis is a moth in the family Depressariidae. It was described by W. Donald Duckworth in 1971. It is found in Venezuela.

The wingspan is 11–13 mm. The forewings are blackish brown, the basal third white tinged faintly with yellow on the costal edge. There are a few blackish-brown scales on the extreme edge of the costa and anal angle. The apical two thirds of the forewing are suffused with bronze-to-violet iridescent scales. The hindwings are blackish brown with a white patch on the basal half of the anterior margin.
