= Gonioterma descitum =

Scientific classification
- Domain: Eukaryota
- Kingdom: Animalia
- Phylum: Arthropoda
- Class: Insecta
- Order: Lepidoptera
- Family: Depressariidae
- Genus: Gonioterma
- Species: G. descitum

Binomial name
- Gonioterma descitum Walsingham, 1913

Species of moth

Gonioterma descitum is a moth in the family Depressariidae. It was described by Lord Walsingham in 1913. It is found in Panama.

The wingspan is about 25 mm. The forewings are pale tawny argillaceous, with three rust-brown costal spots. One small one at one-fourth and the second, larger, at the middle. The third is largest and found at the outer fourth. From the last a slender line of scarcely separate brown spots descends to the tornus, much curved outward toward the termen. A brown shade is diffused from the flexus outward, crossing the fold, and is followed by a narrower brown shade arising before the middle of the dorsum and running obliquely backward nearly to the first costal spot. A faintly indicated similar shade curves outward from the second costal spot, but is lost before attaining the dorsum. A series of small narrow brown spots extends along the termen at the base of the pale tawny argillaceous cilia. The hindwings are yellow.
