= Gonioterma exquisita =

Scientific classification
- Domain: Eukaryota
- Kingdom: Animalia
- Phylum: Arthropoda
- Class: Insecta
- Order: Lepidoptera
- Family: Depressariidae
- Genus: Gonioterma
- Species: G. exquisita

Binomial name
- Gonioterma exquisita Duckworth, 1964

Species of moth

Gonioterma exquisita is a moth in the family Depressariidae. It was described by W. Donald Duckworth in 1964. It is found in Brazil (Minas Gerais).

The wingspan is 21–23 mm. The forewings are white with the base of the costa narrowly fuscous and with three triangular fuscous costal spots, one at the basal third, one near the middle, and one at the apical fourth. From the outer corner of the apical spot a row of fuscous dots extends from the apex along the termen to the tornus and there is a black spot at the base of the cell from which a wide band of olivaceous brown extends to the inner angle. From the apex of the middle costal spot an irregular patch of grey extends transversely around the basal spot to the inner margin and there is a crescent-shaped olivaceous-brown spot at the end of the cell, as well as an irregular patch of grey, shaded with olivaceous brown, extending from the tornus to the apex of the apical costal spot. The hindwings are light grey with a whitish costal margin in males, heavily shaded with fuscous in females.
