= Gonioterma ignobilis =

Scientific classification
- Kingdom: Animalia
- Phylum: Arthropoda
- Clade: Pancrustacea
- Class: Insecta
- Order: Lepidoptera
- Family: Depressariidae
- Genus: Gonioterma
- Species: G. ignobilis

Binomial name
- Gonioterma ignobilis (Zeller, 1854)

Synonyms
- Cryptolechia ignobilis Zeller, 1854; Cryptolechia pauperatella Walker, 1864; Gonioterma anita Busck, 1920

Species of moth

Gonioterma ignobilis is a moth in the family Depressariidae. It was described by Philipp Christoph Zeller in 1854. It is found in French Guiana, Guyana, Panama, Costa Rica, Venezuela and Brazil (Amazonas).

The wingspan is about 22 mm. The forewings are dull chalk whitish, sparsely sprinkled beyond the middle with scattered brown scales. A minute brown spot lies at the base of the costa, a large brown spot on the middle of the costa, a still larger outwardly diffused brown spot at the end of the cell. A small group of brown scales on the cell, at about one-third from the base, with others below them on the middle of the fold. There is also an outwardly bowed series of brown dots before the termen, inwardly angulated before reaching the costa, and a second marginal series along the apex and termen. The hindwings are pale brownish grey.
