= Gonioterma gubernata =

Scientific classification
- Kingdom: Animalia
- Phylum: Arthropoda
- Class: Insecta
- Order: Lepidoptera
- Family: Depressariidae
- Genus: Gonioterma
- Species: G. gubernata

Binomial name
- Gonioterma gubernata (Meyrick, 1915)

Synonyms
- Stenoma gubernata Meyrick, 1915

Species of moth

Gonioterma gubernata is a moth of the family Depressariidae. It is found in Guyana, French Guiana and Brazil.

The wingspan is about 20 mm. The forewings are fuscous whitish with the extreme costal edge white and the stigmata dark fuscous, the first discal enlarged into a moderate round spot, the plical obliquely beyond it. There is a small dark fuscous spot on the costa at one-fourth, a somewhat larger one in the middle, indicating the origin of a short series of several cloudy dark fuscous dots beyond the cell, and a moderate triangular spot at three-fourths, where a rather strongly curved series of dark fuscous dots runs to the dorsum before the tornus. There is also a marginal series of dark fuscous dots around the apex and termen. The hindwings are ochreous whitish.
