= Gonioterma diatriba =

Scientific classification
- Domain: Eukaryota
- Kingdom: Animalia
- Phylum: Arthropoda
- Class: Insecta
- Order: Lepidoptera
- Family: Depressariidae
- Genus: Gonioterma
- Species: G. diatriba

Binomial name
- Gonioterma diatriba (Walsingham, 1913)

Synonyms
- Stenoma diatriba Walsingham, 1913

Species of moth

Gonioterma diatriba is a moth in the family Depressariidae. It was described by Lord Walsingham in 1913. It is found in Guatemala.

The wingspan is about 19 mm. The forewings are dull fawn whitish, somewhat sprinkled with fawn-brownish scales, variable in the intensity of their colour. At the extreme base of the costa is a blackish spot, and a few blackish scales in the fold near its base. Two blackish costal spots, one on the middle, the other halfway between this and the apex, and below them, and equidistant from each, is a slightly smaller round spot of the same colour at the end of the cell. Two parallel lines of small dark fuscous spots, emanating from the upper and lower extremities of the outer costal spot respectively, tend to converge, only at their lower extremities on the dorsum before the tornus, the outer series following the margin around the apex and termen, the other series slightly preceding it. The hindwings are brownish grey, with a pale line, followed by a slight shade, running along the base of the scarcely paler cilia.
