= Gonioterma argicerauna =

Scientific classification
- Kingdom: Animalia
- Phylum: Arthropoda
- Class: Insecta
- Order: Lepidoptera
- Family: Depressariidae
- Genus: Gonioterma
- Species: G. argicerauna

Binomial name
- Gonioterma argicerauna (Meyrick, 1925)

Synonyms
- Stenoma argicerauna Meyrick, 1925

Species of moth

Gonioterma argicerauna is a moth of the family Depressariidae. It is found in Colombia.

The wingspan is about 23 mm. The forewings are pale greyish ochreous, slightly greyer tinged along the costa towards the apex. There is an indistinct acutely dentate whitish line running around the upper margin of the cell, and a transverse mark on the end of the cell. There is an almost marginal series of small indistinct whitish spots around the apex and termen. The hindwings are ochreous whitish.
