= Rectiostoma thiobasis =

Scientific classification
- Domain: Eukaryota
- Kingdom: Animalia
- Phylum: Arthropoda
- Class: Insecta
- Order: Lepidoptera
- Family: Depressariidae
- Genus: Rectiostoma
- Species: R. thiobasis

Binomial name
- Rectiostoma thiobasis (Duckworth, 1971)

Synonyms
- Setiostoma thiobasis Duckworth, 1971

Species of moth

Rectiostoma thiobasis is a moth in the family Depressariidae. It was described by W. Donald Duckworth in 1971. It is found in Brazil.

The wingspan is about 13 mm. The forewings are yellow suffused with pale green basally, concolorous, and continuous with the thorax and tegulae. There are a few brown scales in the anal area and the distal margin of the yellow area is bordered by a dark brown line immediately paralleled by a broad, transverse band of iridescent blue violet. The apical portion of the forewing is dark brown, irregularly patterned with iridescent blue violet. The hindwings are dark brown with a white patch on the anterior margin.
