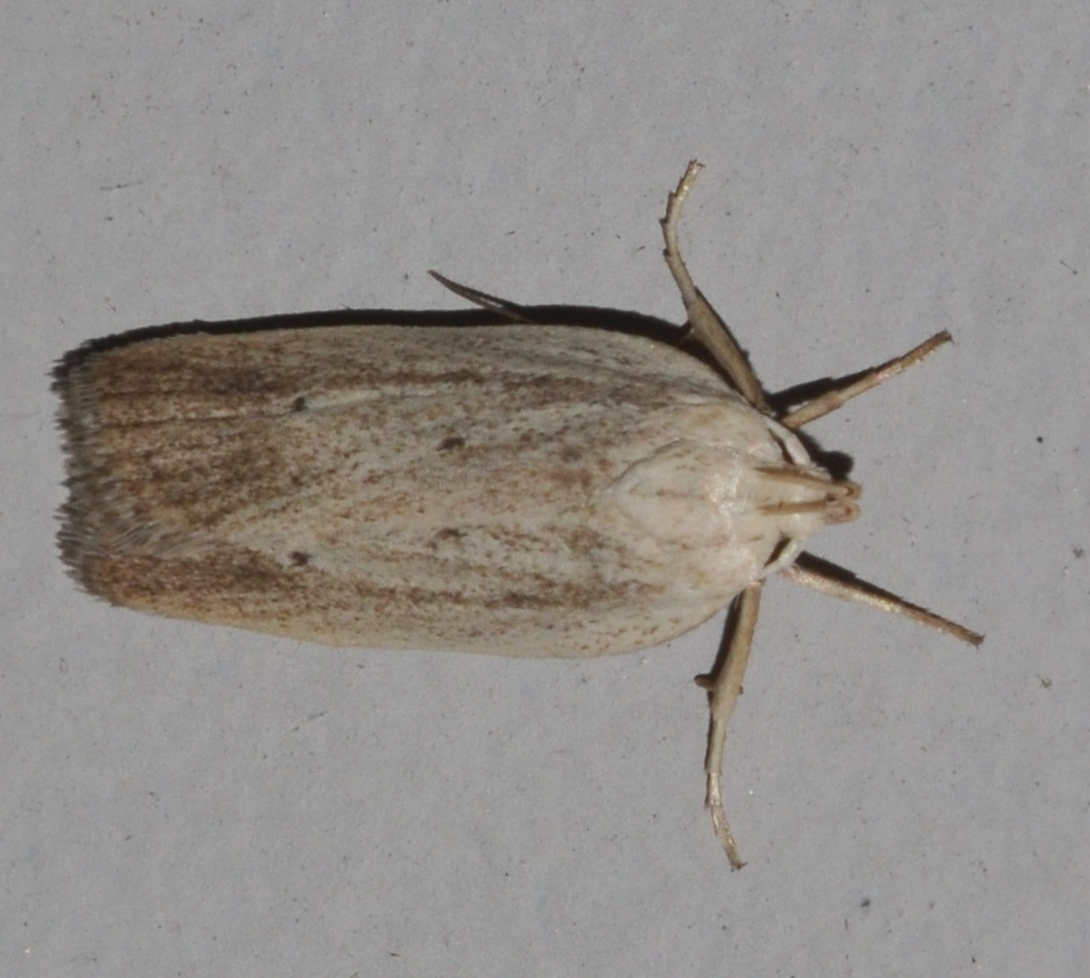

Scientific classification
- Domain: Eukaryota
- Kingdom: Animalia
- Phylum: Arthropoda
- Class: Insecta
- Order: Lepidoptera
- Family: Depressariidae
- Genus: Gonioterma
- Species: G. mistrella

Binomial name
- Gonioterma mistrella (Busck, 1907)

Synonyms
- Stenoma mistrella Busck, 1907

= Gonioterma mistrella =

Species of moth

Gonioterma mistrella is a moth of the family Depressariidae. It is found in North America, where it has been recorded from Mississippi, Missouri, Ohio, Illinois, Texas, Kansas, Pennsylvania, New Mexico, Manitoba and Mexico.

The wingspan is 20–23 mm. Adults are mainly on wing from May to October.

The larvae feed on Phleum pratense. The larvae are pink with a dark dorsal stripe and a chestnut head.
