= Gonioterma anna =

Scientific classification
- Kingdom: Animalia
- Phylum: Arthropoda
- Class: Insecta
- Order: Lepidoptera
- Family: Depressariidae
- Genus: Gonioterma
- Species: G. anna

Binomial name
- Gonioterma anna Busck, 1911

Species of moth

Gonioterma anna is a moth in the family Depressariidae. It was described by August Busck in 1911. It is found in the Guianas and Brazil.

The wingspan is 18–21 mm. The forewings are very light rosy drab with three triangular, equidistant, blackish brown costal spots, the two outer ones large and very prominent, the basal one at the basal third of the costa smaller. On the end of the cell is a small transverse dark brown spot and from the tip of the outer costal spot runs an outwardly curved row of small equidistant dark brown dots across the wing to the dorsum. The extreme terminal edge is deep black. The hindwings are whitish with yellow tips.
