= Rectiostoma flaviceps =

Scientific classification
- Domain: Eukaryota
- Kingdom: Animalia
- Phylum: Arthropoda
- Class: Insecta
- Order: Lepidoptera
- Family: Depressariidae
- Genus: Rectiostoma
- Species: R. flaviceps

Binomial name
- Rectiostoma flaviceps (Felder & Rogenhofer, 1875)

Synonyms
- Setiostoma flaviceps Felder & Rogenhofer, 1875; Glyphipterix flaviceps

Species of moth

Rectiostoma flaviceps is a moth in the family Depressariidae. It was described by Cajetan Felder, Rudolf Felder and Alois Friedrich Rogenhofer in 1875. It is found in the amazon. The species was previously mostly placed in the genus Glyphipterix.
