= Gonioterma alsiosum =

Scientific classification
- Kingdom: Animalia
- Phylum: Arthropoda
- Clade: Pancrustacea
- Class: Insecta
- Order: Lepidoptera
- Family: Depressariidae
- Genus: Gonioterma
- Species: G. alsiosum

Binomial name
- Gonioterma alsiosum Walsingham, 1913

Species of moth

Gonioterma alsiosum is a moth in the family Depressariidae. It was described by Lord Walsingham in 1913. It is found in Panama.

The wingspan is about 35 mm. The forewings are testaceous, with a patch of bluish grey suffusion beyond the end of the cell (only apparent in some lights), not reaching the termen or costa. Before it, at the end of the cell, is a single round blackish spot between veins 5 and 6. The hindwings are tawny grey, pale ochreous along the costa.
