= Rectiostoma eusema =

Scientific classification
- Domain: Eukaryota
- Kingdom: Animalia
- Phylum: Arthropoda
- Class: Insecta
- Order: Lepidoptera
- Family: Depressariidae
- Genus: Rectiostoma
- Species: R. eusema

Binomial name
- Rectiostoma eusema (Walsingham, 1914)

Synonyms
- Setiostoma eusema Walsingham, 1914

Species of moth

Rectiostoma eusema is a moth in the family Depressariidae. It was described by Lord Walsingham in 1914. It is found in Guatemala.

The wingspan is about 12 mm. The forewings are bright yellow at the base, with a rosy purplish metallic spot on the costa, and a limbal shade in the yellow basal patch, which is bounded at about one-fourth by a dark reddish cupreous line, descending straight from the costa to the dorsum, its outer side shining rosy steel grey, succeeded by a band of rich cupreous, on the outer edge of which about the middle, is a conspicuous tuft of raised dark brownish fuscous scales; the median portion of the wing, except for a cupreous patch, on the costa rather beyond the middle, is shining rosy steel, blending into a cupreous patch, produced to the apex and containing some black and bright blue-metallic scales in its upper portion, and a strong patch of brilliant purple before the termen. The hindwings are shining, dark brownish cupreous.
