= Gonioterma pacatum =

Scientific classification
- Kingdom: Animalia
- Phylum: Arthropoda
- Clade: Pancrustacea
- Class: Insecta
- Order: Lepidoptera
- Family: Depressariidae
- Genus: Gonioterma
- Species: G. pacatum

Binomial name
- Gonioterma pacatum Walsingham, 1913

Species of moth

Gonioterma pacatum is a moth in the family Depressariidae. It was described by Lord Walsingham in 1913. It is found in Guatemala.

The wingspan is about 18 mm. The forewings are shining, silky whitish ochreous, with two dark brown costal spots, one at the middle, the other beyond it. There is also a very small dark spot at the base of the costa, and sometimes a minute brown dot at the end of the cell. The hindwings are silky, yellowish white.
