= Gonioterma burmanniana =

Scientific classification
- Kingdom: Animalia
- Phylum: Arthropoda
- Class: Insecta
- Order: Lepidoptera
- Family: Depressariidae
- Genus: Gonioterma
- Species: G. burmanniana

Binomial name
- Gonioterma burmanniana (Stoll, [1782])

Synonyms
- Phalaena burmanniana Stoll, [1782]; Phalaena burmaniana Stoll, [1781]; Cryptolechia tortricella Walker, 1864

Species of moth

Gonioterma burmanniana is a moth in the family Depressariidae. It was described by Caspar Stoll in 1782. It is found in Brazil.

Adults are whitish yellow, with the forewings acutely rectangular at the tips, with four deep black costal marks. The first mark basal and the third larger than the fourth, and much larger than the first and than the second. There is a submarginal slightly outward-curved line of black points, ending in the fourth costal mark and the fringe is blackish cupreous. The hindwings have a slight aeneous tinge and the fringe is cupreous along the fore part of the exterior border.
