= Rectiostoma leuconympha =

Scientific classification
- Kingdom: Animalia
- Phylum: Arthropoda
- Class: Insecta
- Order: Lepidoptera
- Family: Depressariidae
- Genus: Rectiostoma
- Species: R. leuconympha

Binomial name
- Rectiostoma leuconympha (Meyrick, 1921)

Synonyms
- Setiostoma leuconympha Meyrick, 1921

Species of moth

Rectiostoma leuconympha is a moth in the family Depressariidae. It was described by Edward Meyrick in 1921. It is found in Brazil.
