= Gonioterma chlorina =

Scientific classification
- Domain: Eukaryota
- Kingdom: Animalia
- Phylum: Arthropoda
- Class: Insecta
- Order: Lepidoptera
- Family: Depressariidae
- Genus: Gonioterma
- Species: G. chlorina

Binomial name
- Gonioterma chlorina (Kearfott, 1911)

Synonyms
- Stenoma chlorina Kearfott, 1911

Species of moth

Gonioterma chlorina is a moth in the family Depressariidae. It was described by William D. Kearfott in 1911. It is found in São Paulo, Brazil.

The wingspan is 24–27 mm. The forewings are shining chlorina green, in males in certain lights and from certain angles, a lighter, whitish shade is visible, especially between upper edge of the cell and the costa, at the end of the cell and in a narrow terminal line. In the females, this white shade is permanent and parallels the costa from the extreme base to the middle of the termen. It is interrupted at the middle of the costa and sends a narrow curved spur to the dot at the end of the cell, and then to the hindmargin. It is somewhat speckled through its length by the ground color. In the females, the terminal whitish line is much more distinct. There is a dark brown, almost black, spot on the fold at two-fifths of the wing length from the base and at the end of the cell is a more intense dot of the ground color, surrounded by whitish scales. The hindwings are dull ocherous brown.
