= Gonioterma crambitella =

Scientific classification
- Domain: Eukaryota
- Kingdom: Animalia
- Phylum: Arthropoda
- Class: Insecta
- Order: Lepidoptera
- Family: Depressariidae
- Genus: Gonioterma
- Species: G. crambitella

Binomial name
- Gonioterma crambitella (Walsingham, 1889)

Synonyms
- Stenoma crambitella Walsingham, 1889

Species of moth

Gonioterma crambitella is a moth in the family Depressariidae. It was described by Lord Walsingham in 1889. It is found in North America, where it has been recorded from Arizona, Texas and Arkansas.

The wingspan is about 22 mm. The forewings are rather shining white with a suffusion of faint ochreous scales along the veins and nervules. On the extreme costal margin at the base are a few greyish-fuscous scales, and a single dot of the same colour lies at the end of the discal cell in the middle of the wing. The hindwings are greyish white, with a faint ochreous tinge. Adults are on wing from April to August.
