= Gonioterma seppiana =

Scientific classification
- Domain: Eukaryota
- Kingdom: Animalia
- Phylum: Arthropoda
- Class: Insecta
- Order: Lepidoptera
- Family: Depressariidae
- Genus: Gonioterma
- Species: G. seppiana

Binomial name
- Gonioterma seppiana (Stoll, [1781])

Synonyms
- Phalaena seppiana Stoll, [1781]; Stenoma platycolpa Meyrick, 1915; Stenoma sceptrifera Meyrick, 1916

Species of moth

Gonioterma seppiana is a moth of the family Depressariidae. It is found in the Guianas.

The wingspan is about 20 mm. The forewings are whitish fuscous with the extreme costal edge ochreous whitish. The stigmata are dark fuscous, the plical very obliquely beyond the first discal. There is a suffused dark fuscous streak along the dorsum from one-fifth to two-thirds, and some undefined fuscous suffusion between this and the stigmata. A small dark fuscous spot is found on the costa at one-fourth and there are rather large triangular blackish spots on the costa at the middle and four-fifths, the first indicating the origin of a hardly defined cloudy curved line of fuscous irroration passing behind the cell, the second giving rise to a curved series of dark fuscous dots running to the dorsum before the tornus. There is also a marginal series of black dots around the apex and termen. The hindwings are whitish yellowish, hardly perceptibly greyish tinged anteriorly.
