= Gonioterma projecta =

Scientific classification
- Kingdom: Animalia
- Phylum: Arthropoda
- Class: Insecta
- Order: Lepidoptera
- Family: Depressariidae
- Genus: Gonioterma
- Species: G. projecta

Binomial name
- Gonioterma projecta (Meyrick, 1915)

Synonyms
- Stenoma projecta Meyrick, 1915

Species of moth

Gonioterma projecta is a moth of the family Depressariidae. It is found in French Guiana.

The wingspan is 19–20 mm for males and 22–23 mm for females. The forewings are fuscous whitish with the extreme costal edge white. The stigmata are small and dark fuscous, the plical midway between the discal. There is a small dark fuscous spot on the costa at one-fourth, and moderate ones at the middle and three-fourths. A partial indistinct sinuate grey transverse shade is found beyond the cell and there is a rather strongly curved series of dark fuscous dots from the third costal spot to the dorsum before the tornus, as well as a marginal series of dark fuscous dots around the apex and termen. The hindwings are ochreous whitish, with the apical edge fuscous.
