= Gonioterma bolistis =

Scientific classification
- Kingdom: Animalia
- Phylum: Arthropoda
- Clade: Pancrustacea
- Class: Insecta
- Order: Lepidoptera
- Family: Depressariidae
- Genus: Gonioterma
- Species: G. bolistis

Binomial name
- Gonioterma bolistis (Meyrick, 1925)

Synonyms
- Stenoma bolistis Meyrick, 1925

Species of moth

Gonioterma bolistis is a moth of the family Depressariidae. It is found in Brazil (Amazonas).

The wingspan is about 19 mm. The forewings are ochreous white with a small very oblique dark fuscous mark on the costa at one-fourth, and a small blackish spot on dorsum at one-fourth, some brownish scales tending to indicate an irregular curved line between these. The stigmata are very small, indistinct, fuscous, the plical obliquely beyond the first discal, some faint irregular brownish suffusion towards the median area of the dorsum. There is a moderate blackish spot on the middle of the costa, where a faint undefined irregular curved line of brownish irroration runs to the dorsum at three-fourths. There is a rather large semi-oval blackish spot on the costa at four-fifths, where a curved series of dark fuscous dots runs to the tornus. There is also a terminal series of dark fuscous sublinear dots. The hindwings are pale whitish ochreous.
