= Rectiostoma ochrobasis =

Scientific classification
- Domain: Eukaryota
- Kingdom: Animalia
- Phylum: Arthropoda
- Class: Insecta
- Order: Lepidoptera
- Family: Depressariidae
- Genus: Rectiostoma
- Species: R. ochrobasis

Binomial name
- Rectiostoma ochrobasis (Duckworth, 1971)

Synonyms
- Setiostoma ochrobasis Duckworth, 1971

Species of moth

Rectiostoma ochrobasis is a moth in the family Depressariidae. It was described by W. Donald Duckworth in 1971. It is found in the humid low highlands of south-eastern Peru and Bolivia.

The wingspan is 8–9 mm. The forewings are dark brown, with a pale yellow transverse band from the costa to the dorsum at the basal fourth, parallel to the distal margin of the yellow band extends a dark brown line followed by a broader band of iridescent blue. The apical two thirds of the forewing has a wide area of dark brown, scattered with iridescent bronze scales, followed distally by irregular patterns of iridescent violet. The hindwings are dark brown with a white patch on the anterior margin.
