= Gonioterma aesiocopia =

Scientific classification
- Domain: Eukaryota
- Kingdom: Animalia
- Phylum: Arthropoda
- Class: Insecta
- Order: Lepidoptera
- Family: Depressariidae
- Genus: Gonioterma
- Species: G. aesiocopia

Binomial name
- Gonioterma aesiocopia (Walsingham, 1913)

Synonyms
- Stenoma aesiocopia Walsingham, 1913; Stenoma aphrogramma Meyrick, 1929

Species of moth

Gonioterma aesiocopia is a moth in the family Depressariidae. It was described by Lord Walsingham in 1913. It is found in Mexico (Vera Cruz) and Panama.

The wingspan is about 21 mm. The forewings are pale mouse grey, with a conspicuous fuscous spot on the cell at one-third, a small fuscous dot in the fold below and a little beyond it, and an obscure dot at the end of the cell. The costa is stained with yellowish brown from base to apex, and a white cloud-like band commencing at the base runs parallel with the costa nearly to the apex, sending an attenuated offshoot along the outer end of the cell, thence pointing inward along the cell; a narrow white band follows the termen from apex to tornus. The hindwings are pale yellowish grey.
