= Rectiostoma earobasis =

Scientific classification
- Domain: Eukaryota
- Kingdom: Animalia
- Phylum: Arthropoda
- Class: Insecta
- Order: Lepidoptera
- Family: Depressariidae
- Genus: Rectiostoma
- Species: R. earobasis

Binomial name
- Rectiostoma earobasis (Duckworth, 1971)

Synonyms
- Setiostoma earobasis Duckworth, 1971

Species of moth

Rectiostoma earobasis is a moth in the family Depressariidae. It was described by W. Donald Duckworth in 1971. It is found in Bolivia.

The wingspan is about 13 mm. The forewings are pale yellow basally, edged with dark brown on the costa from the base and at the anal angle. The distal margin of the yellow area is bordered by a dark brown line immediately paralleled by a broad, transverse band of iridescent violet. The apical half of the forewing is dark brown suffused with iridescent blue violet. The hindwings are dark brown with white patch on the anterior margin.
