= Gonioterma dimetropis =

Scientific classification
- Kingdom: Animalia
- Phylum: Arthropoda
- Class: Insecta
- Order: Lepidoptera
- Family: Depressariidae
- Genus: Gonioterma
- Species: G. dimetropis

Binomial name
- Gonioterma dimetropis (Meyrick, 1932)

Synonyms
- Stenoma dimetropis Meyrick, 1932

Species of moth

Gonioterma dimetropis is a moth in the family Depressariidae. It was described by Edward Meyrick in 1932. It is found in Mexico (Guerrero).
