= Rectiostoma fernaldella =

Scientific classification
- Domain: Eukaryota
- Kingdom: Animalia
- Phylum: Arthropoda
- Class: Insecta
- Order: Lepidoptera
- Family: Depressariidae
- Genus: Rectiostoma
- Species: R. fernaldella

Binomial name
- Rectiostoma fernaldella (Riley, 1889)

Synonyms
- Setiostoma fernaldella Riley, 1889

Species of moth

Rectiostoma fernaldella (stenomid oak leaf tier) is a species of moth in the family Depressariidae. It was described by Riley in 1889. It is found from southern Mexico to the United States, where it is found in the eastern basin and range area in southern Arizona and disjunctly to California. There is also a record for Tennessee.

The wingspan is about 13 mm. Adults have been observed flying in shady areas under oaks during midday. There is a single annual generation in California, with adults on wing in May, June and July.

The larvae feed on Quercus agrifolia, Quercus wislizenii, Quercus dumosa, Quercus dumosax engelmanni, Quercus lobata, Quercus suber, Quercus chrysolepis, Quercus dunii, Lithocarpus densiflorus, Chrysolepis chrysophylla and Chrysolepis semipervirens. The larvae utilize shelters made by the preceding generation for overwintering. These shelters consist of two leaves sandwiched together with a thick rim of frass and silk sealing their edges. Within these shelters the larva skeletonize both leaf surfaces.
