= Gonioterma compressa =

Scientific classification
- Domain: Eukaryota
- Kingdom: Animalia
- Phylum: Arthropoda
- Class: Insecta
- Order: Lepidoptera
- Family: Depressariidae
- Genus: Gonioterma
- Species: G. compressa

Binomial name
- Gonioterma compressa (Walsingham, 1913)

Synonyms
- Stenoma compressa Walsingham, 1913; Stenoma cacoeciella Amsel, 1956

Species of moth

Gonioterma compressa is a moth in the family Depressariidae. It was described by Lord Walsingham in 1913. It is found in Venezuela and Mexico (Tabasco).

The wingspan is about 18 mm. The forewings are pale stone grey, with pale rust-brown markings which tend to throw up rather more intensely coloured rust-brown scales along their margins. These consist of first, an irregular, large, dorsal patch covering two-fifths of the dorsum, throwing out a slight angle on the fold, and a stronger projecting angle upward nearly to the costa, but not reaching the base. Secondly, a broken and rather outwardly oblique fasciate shade a little beyond the middle, forming a costal spot, an inwardly projecting patch at the end of the cell, and a short length-spot on the dorsum, connected to the cell-spot by a narrow sinuate line. Thirdly, a costal spot before the apex, connected with the tornus by an outwardly convex narrow line of spots on the veins. Around the apex and termen is also a line of semidetached brown spots. The costa is narrowly tinged with ochreous. The hindwings are pale brownish grey.
