= Rectiostoma flinti =

Scientific classification
- Domain: Eukaryota
- Kingdom: Animalia
- Phylum: Arthropoda
- Class: Insecta
- Order: Lepidoptera
- Family: Depressariidae
- Genus: Rectiostoma
- Species: R. flinti

Binomial name
- Rectiostoma flinti (Duckworth, 1971)

Synonyms
- Setiostoma flinti Duckworth, 1971

Species of moth

Rectiostoma flinti is a moth in the family Depressariidae. It was described by W. Donald Duckworth in 1971. It is found in Mexico.

The wingspan is 13–16 mm (0.5–0.6 in). The forewings are yellow basally, concolorous and continuous with the thorax and tegulae except for a small patch of gray brown at the extreme base of the dorsum. The distal margin of the yellow area is bordered by a dark brown line immediately paralleled by a broad transverse band of iridescent blue. The apical half of the forewing is dark brown with alternating irregular transverse patterns of red brown, black, iridescent gray, iridescent blue violet, red brown, black, iridescent blue violet in sequence from midpoint to apex. The hindwings are dark brown with a white patch on the anterior margin.

The larvae possibly feed on Philodendron species, but it is also possible that the plant was growing in close association with the actual host plant and the insect accidentally pupated on it instead of the host.
