= Gonioterma chromolitha =

Scientific classification
- Kingdom: Animalia
- Phylum: Arthropoda
- Class: Insecta
- Order: Lepidoptera
- Family: Depressariidae
- Genus: Gonioterma
- Species: G. chromolitha

Binomial name
- Gonioterma chromolitha (Meyrick, 1925)

Synonyms
- Stenoma chromolitha Meyrick, 1925

Species of moth

Gonioterma chromolitha is a moth of the family Depressariidae. It is found in Bolivia.

The wingspan is about 24 mm. The forewings are ochreous white, the costal edge pale greyish ochreous, towards the base dark grey. There are three dark indigo-blue spots on the costa, the first two small, at one-fourth and the middle, the third larger, at four-fifths. There is a patch of brownish-grey suffusion covering the dorsal half from one-fourth to the tornus, limited posteriorly by a curved dark coppery-grey shade from the third costal spot. The plical and second discal stigmata form suffused coppery-purplish spots, each connected with the dorsum by a dark coppery-purplish shade, some dark purplish suffusion towards the dorsum between these. There is a marginal series of dark indigo-blue dots around the apex and upper part of the termen, the largest above the apex. The hindwings are ochreous whitish, the terminal edge more ochreous tinged.
