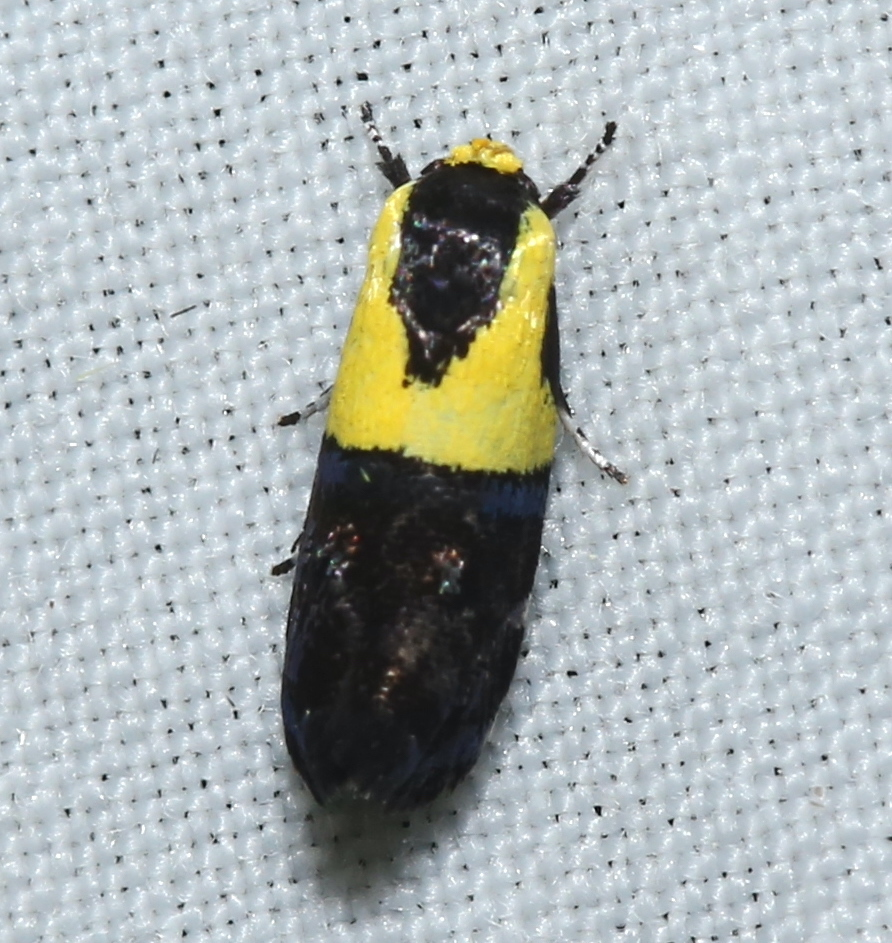

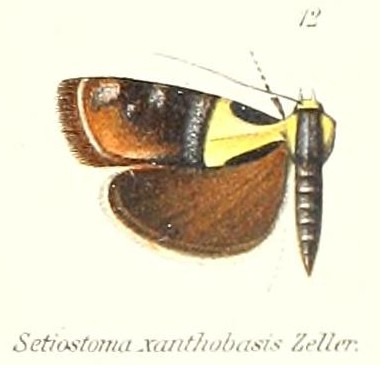

Scientific classification
- Kingdom: Animalia
- Phylum: Arthropoda
- Clade: Pancrustacea
- Class: Insecta
- Order: Lepidoptera
- Family: Depressariidae
- Genus: Rectiostoma
- Species: R. xanthobasis

Binomial name
- Rectiostoma xanthobasis (Zeller, 1876)

Synonyms
- Setiostoma xanthobasis Zeller, 1876

= Rectiostoma xanthobasis =

Species of moth

Rectiostoma xanthobasis (yellow-vested moth) is a species of moth in the family Depressariidae. It was described by Philipp Christoph Zeller in 1876. It is found along the Atlantic Coastal Plain from south-eastern Massachusetts south to central Florida and eastern Texas, and north in the Mississippi Valley to Missouri and Illinois.

The wingspan is 12–14 mm. The forewings are dark brown, with lemon yellow triangular area, continuous with a yellow tegula, occupying the basal third except for the short costal lenticular spot and a longer, narrower spot along the posterior wing margin, both spots concolorous with the ground color. The apical two thirds of the forewing have an inconspicuous area of white scales near the midlength of the costa and a similar, smaller area slightly more distad. There is a broad transverse band, parallel to distal margin of the yellow area and a small group of scales behind the basal white area. There is a short curved band extending from the distal white area and a submarginal longer straight, iridescent blue violet band parallel to the outer wing margin. The hindwings are dark brown with a white patch on the basal half of the anterior margin.

The larvae feed on Quercus species, including Quercus nigra and Quercus stellata. They feed from within a shelter constructed of two leaves sandwiched together with silk.
