= Rectiostoma chrysabasis =

Scientific classification
- Domain: Eukaryota
- Kingdom: Animalia
- Phylum: Arthropoda
- Class: Insecta
- Order: Lepidoptera
- Family: Depressariidae
- Genus: Rectiostoma
- Species: R. chrysabasis

Binomial name
- Rectiostoma chrysabasis (Duckworth, 1971)

Synonyms
- Setiostoma chrysabasis Duckworth, 1971

Species of moth

Rectiostoma chrysabasis is a moth in the family Depressariidae. It was described by W. Donald Duckworth in 1971. It is found in Santa Catarina, Brazil.

The wingspan is about 16 mm. The forewings are concolorous with the thorax and tegulae basally, extending to the midpoint. The distal margin is irregularly concave bordered by a broad, transverse band of iridescent blue violet. The apical portion of the forewing is dark brown, irregularly patterned with iridescent blue violet. The hindwings are dark brown apically and white basally.
