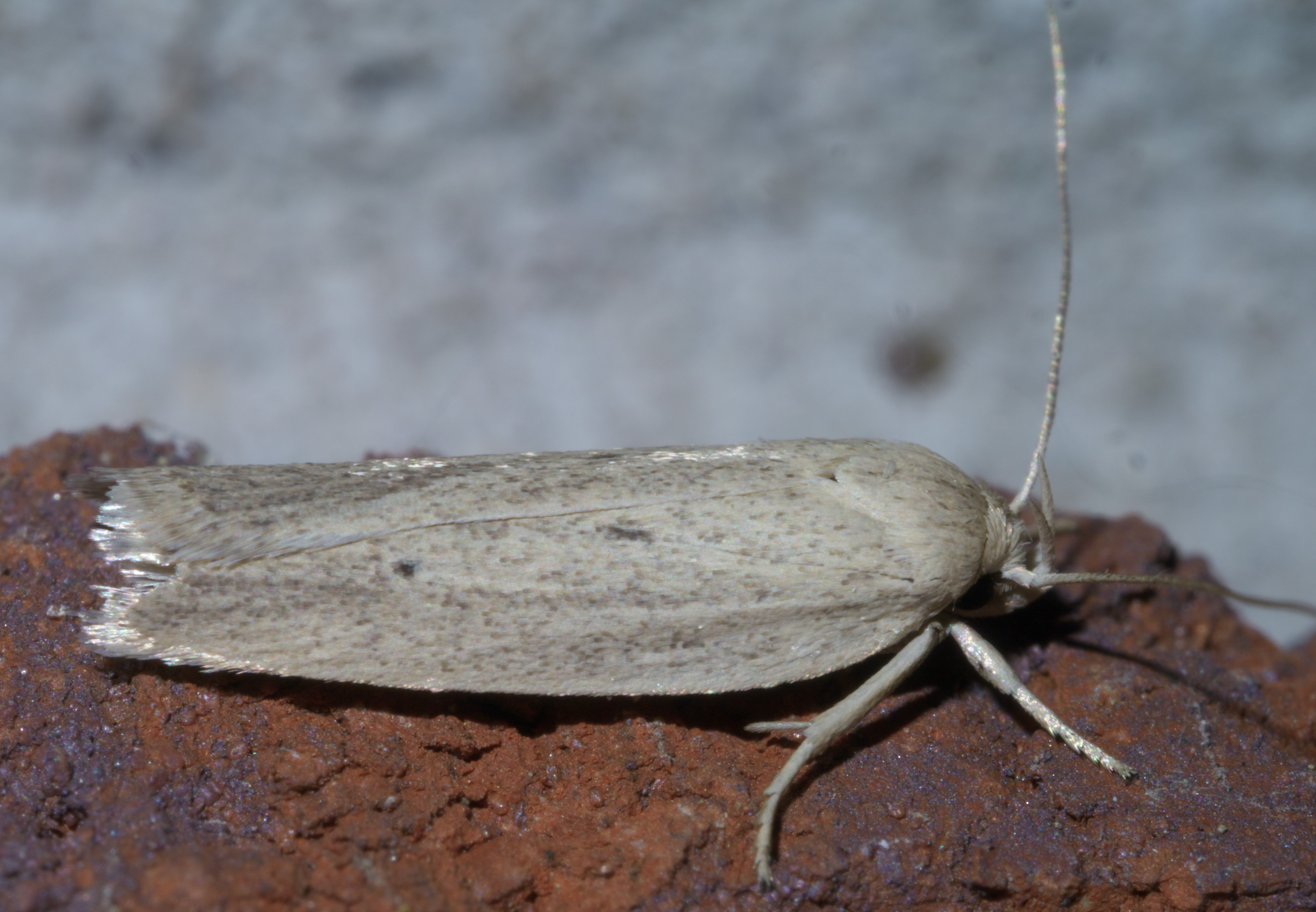
- "Gonioterma mistrella"

Scientific classification
- Domain: Eukaryota
- Kingdom: Animalia
- Phylum: Arthropoda
- Class: Insecta
- Order: Lepidoptera
- Family: Depressariidae
- Subfamily: Stenomatinae
- Genus: Gonioterma; Walsingham, 1897

= Gonioterma =

Genus of moths

Gonioterma is a genus of moths in the subfamily Stenomatinae.

== Species ==
- Gonioterma aesiocopia (Walsingham, 1913)
- Gonioterma algosa (Meyrick, 1916)
- Gonioterma alsiosum Walsingham, 1913
- Gonioterma anna Busck, 1911
- Gonioterma argicerauna (Meyrick, 1925)
- Gonioterma bolistis (Meyrick, 1925)
- Gonioterma bryophanes (Meyrick, 1915)
- Gonioterma burmanniana (Stoll, [1782])
- Gonioterma chlorina (Kearfott, 1911)
- Gonioterma choleroptila (Meyrick, 1915)
- Gonioterma chromolitha (Meyrick, 1925)
- Gonioterma compressa (Walsingham, 1913)
- Gonioterma conchita Busck, 1920
- Gonioterma crocoptila (Meyrick, 1915)
- Gonioterma crambitella (Walsingham, 1889)
- Gonioterma descitum Walsingham, 1913
- Gonioterma diatriba (Walsingham, 1913)
- Gonioterma dimetropis (Meyrick, 1932)
- Gonioterma expansa (Meyrick, 1915)
- Gonioterma exquisita Duckworth, 1964
- Gonioterma fastigata (Meyrick, 1915)
- Gonioterma gubernata (Meyrick, 1915)
- Gonioterma ignobilis (Zeller, 1854)
- Gonioterma indecora (Zeller, 1854)
- Gonioterma inga Busck, 1911
- Gonioterma latipennis (Zeller, 1877)
- Gonioterma linteata (Meyrick, 1916)
- Gonioterma mistrella (Busck, 1907)
- Gonioterma notifera (Meyrick, 1915)
- Gonioterma pacatum Walsingham, 1913
- Gonioterma pauperatella Walker, 1864 see junior synonym Gonioterma advocata (Meyrick, 1916)
- Gonioterma periscelta (Meyrick, 1915)
- Gonioterma phortax Meyrick, 1915
- Gonioterma pleonastes (Meyrick, 1915)
- Gonioterma projecta (Meyrick, 1915)
- Gonioterma seppiana (Stoll, [1781])
