= Gonioterma periscelta =

Scientific classification
- Kingdom: Animalia
- Phylum: Arthropoda
- Class: Insecta
- Order: Lepidoptera
- Family: Depressariidae
- Genus: Gonioterma
- Species: G. periscelta

Binomial name
- Gonioterma periscelta (Meyrick, 1915)

Synonyms
- Stenoma periscelta Meyrick, 1915

Species of moth

Gonioterma periscelta is a moth of the family Depressariidae. It is found in Peru.

The wingspan is 16–18 mm. The forewings are brownish grey with the extreme costal edge whitish and with a small faint fuscous spot on the costa before one-third, and larger cloudy fuscous spots at the middle and three-fourths. The stigmata are cloudy and dark fuscous, the plical very obliquely beyond the first discal, nearer the second. There is a very undefined thick cloudy fuscous shade passing around the posterior margin of the cell to the plical stigma, and then directly to the dorsum. A curved series of cloudy dark fuscous dots is found from the third costal spot to the tornus and there is a marginal series of dark fuscous dots around the posterior part of the costa and termen. The hindwings are blackish grey.
