= Gonioterma fastigata =

Scientific classification
- Kingdom: Animalia
- Phylum: Arthropoda
- Class: Insecta
- Order: Lepidoptera
- Family: Depressariidae
- Genus: Gonioterma
- Species: G. fastigata

Binomial name
- Gonioterma fastigata (Meyrick, 1915)

Synonyms
- Stenoma fastigata Meyrick, 1915

Species of moth

Gonioterma fastigata is a moth of the family Depressariidae. It is found in Guyana.

The wingspan is 23–24 mm. The forewings are pale ochreous with the costal edge ochreous-yellow, margined beneath on the posterior two-thirds with deeper ochreous or fuscous suffusion, stronger and darker posteriorly. There is a suffused light brownish or fuscous streak from the middle of the base parallel with the costa to one-third. A similar better marked streak runs from the dorsum near the base to a patch on the middle of the costa, where a similar streak runs toward the tornus becoming faint in the disc and merged in a general very undefined deeper ochreous or light fuscous terminal suffusion. There is a similar less marked or nearly obsolete streak along the dorsum. The hindwings are pale whitish yellowish, with the termen suffused with ochreous yellow.
