= Gonioterma choleroptila =

Scientific classification
- Kingdom: Animalia
- Phylum: Arthropoda
- Class: Insecta
- Order: Lepidoptera
- Family: Depressariidae
- Genus: Gonioterma
- Species: G. choleroptila

Binomial name
- Gonioterma choleroptila (Meyrick, 1915)

Synonyms
- Stenoma choleroptila Meyrick, 1915

Species of moth

Gonioterma choleroptila is a moth of the family Depressariidae. It is found in Guyana.

The wingspan is 16–21 mm. The forewings are white, tinged with fuscous, more or less sprinkled with dark fuscous and with a dark fuscous dot near the base in the middle, and one on the base of the costa. There is a small dark fuscous spot on the costa at one-fourth, and larger rounded ones at the middle and four-fifths. The stigmata are small and dark fuscous, the plical midway between the discal. A curved series of cloudy dark fuscous dots is found from the third costal spot to the dorsum before the tornus and there is a marginal series of dark fuscous dots around the apex and termen. The hindwings are whitish, towards the apex faintly yellowish tinged.
