= Stenoma inflata =

Scientific classification
- Domain: Eukaryota
- Kingdom: Animalia
- Phylum: Arthropoda
- Class: Insecta
- Order: Lepidoptera
- Family: Depressariidae
- Genus: Stenoma
- Species: S. inflata

Binomial name
- Stenoma inflata (Butler, 1877)

Synonyms
- Cryptolechia inflata Butler, 1877; Stenoma delenita Meyrick, 1915; Gonioterma stella Busck, 1911

Species of moth

Stenoma inflata is a moth of the family Depressariidae. It is found in the Amazon region and French Guiana.

The wingspan is about 27 mm. The forewings are whitish brownish, faintly violet tinged, with scattered dark fuscous scales and with the costal edge ochreous whitish. The second discal stigma is very small and dark fuscous and there is a rather small suffused dark fuscous spot on the middle of the costa, and a larger triangular one at four-fifths, where a curved series of cloudy dark fuscous dots runs to the tornus. There is also a marginal series of blackish dots around the apex and termen. The hindwings are pale ochreous.
