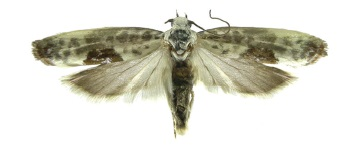

Scientific classification
- Domain: Eukaryota
- Kingdom: Animalia
- Phylum: Arthropoda
- Class: Insecta
- Order: Lepidoptera
- Family: Depressariidae
- Genus: Ethmia
- Species: E. elutella

Binomial name
- Ethmia elutella Busck, 1914

= Ethmia elutella =

Species of moth

Ethmia elutella is a moth in the family Depressariidae. It is found from Panama to Venezuela and Trinidad. There is also a record from Chile.

The length of the forewings is 6.3–8.3 mm (0.25–0.33 in). The ground color of the forewings is white, mostly obscured by grayish clouding or ill-defined blotches basally and through the costal half except along the costa on the distal one-third. The ground color of the hindwings is pale gray except under the costal hair pencil, where it is pale ocherous. Adults are on wing in February, March and May.
