= Antaeotricha tritogramma =

Scientific classification
- Domain: Eukaryota
- Kingdom: Animalia
- Phylum: Arthropoda
- Class: Insecta
- Order: Lepidoptera
- Family: Depressariidae
- Genus: Antaeotricha
- Species: A. tritogramma

Binomial name
- Antaeotricha tritogramma Meyrick, 1925

Species of moth

Antaeotricha tritogramma is a moth in the family Depressariidae. It was described by Edward Meyrick in 1925. It is found in Brazil.

The wingspan is 13–15 mm. Adults are extremely similar to Antaeotricha protosaris, except for a very oblique dark fuscous streak from the costa at one-fourth, reaching one-third across the wing, and an elongate dark fuscous spot beneath the apex of this (these two markings are absent in protosaris). The space between the second and third lines is more generally suffused fuscous except on the costa. The hindwings in males are greyer, with a whitish subcostal hairpencil reaching to somewhat beyond the middle (in protosaris hardly reaching the middle).
