= Antaeotricha protosaris =

Scientific classification
- Domain: Eukaryota
- Kingdom: Animalia
- Phylum: Arthropoda
- Class: Insecta
- Order: Lepidoptera
- Family: Depressariidae
- Genus: Antaeotricha
- Species: A. protosaris

Binomial name
- Antaeotricha protosaris Meyrick, 1915

Species of moth

Antaeotricha protosaris is a moth in the family Depressariidae. It was described by Edward Meyrick in 1915. It is found in the Guianas and Brazil.

The wingspan is 13–15 mm. The forewings are ochreous-whitish, the dorsal half suffused with grey and with a dark fuscous streak from the base of the costa to one-third of the disc and with a dark fuscous streak along the fold from the base to the middle, as well as two oblique dark fuscous streaks from the costa at the middle and three-fourths, connected by some fuscous suffusion beneath the costa and a more or less defined dark fuscous streak in the disc, beneath this merged in the grey suffusion, which becomes dark fuscous towards the tornus. There is some fuscous suffusion towards the apex and termen and there are seven black marginal dots around the posterior part of the costa and termen, the central one largest. The hindwings of the males are rather light grey, while they are dark grey in females. There is a moderately long ochreous-whitish subcostal hairpencil lying beneath the forewings.
