= Antaeotricha reductella =

Scientific classification
- Kingdom: Animalia
- Phylum: Arthropoda
- Class: Insecta
- Order: Lepidoptera
- Family: Depressariidae
- Genus: Antaeotricha
- Species: A. reductella

Binomial name
- Antaeotricha reductella (Walker, 1864)

Synonyms
- Cryptolechia reductella Walker, 1864; Stenoma phoebe Busck, 1911

Species of moth

Antaeotricha reductella is a moth in the family Depressariidae. It was described by Francis Walker in 1864. It is found in Amazonas, Brazil and in French Guiana.

The wingspan is 21–22 mm. Adults are similar to Antaeotricha addon, but the upper costal half of the forewings is nearly pure white instead of merely lighter grey as in A. addon, and only the two outer fasciae can be traced in this part of the wing. The first basal fascia is represented by the dorsal spot only, broadly washed out and somewhat nearer the base than in A. addon. The series of small black marginal dots is rather more distinct than in A. addon. The hindwings are whitish and light fuscous toward the tip.
