= Antaeotricha addon =

Scientific classification
- Kingdom: Animalia
- Phylum: Arthropoda
- Clade: Pancrustacea
- Class: Insecta
- Order: Lepidoptera
- Family: Depressariidae
- Genus: Antaeotricha
- Species: A. addon

Binomial name
- Antaeotricha addon (Busck, 1911)

Synonyms
- Stenoma addon Busck, 1911; Phalaena cicadella Sepp, [1852] (preocc. Sepp, [1832])

Species of moth in genus Antaeotricha

Antaeotricha addon is a moth in the family Depressariidae. It was described by August Busck in 1911. It is found in the Guianas and Brazil.

The wingspan is about 25 mm. The forewings are white suffused with light soft grey, somewhat darker on the dorsal than on the costal half. Two dark greyish brown zigzag lines are found across the wing, very faint on the costal side, stronger and emphasized by heavy washed, dark shades externally on the dorsal side. The one begins at the basal third of the costa and runs to the middle of the dorsum, the other begins on the middle of the costa and runs to the apical fourth of the dorsum. Yet further out on the wing is a thin evenly outwardly curved line across the wing. The hindwings are dark fuscous.
