= Antaeotricha caenochytis =

Scientific classification
- Kingdom: Animalia
- Phylum: Arthropoda
- Clade: Pancrustacea
- Class: Insecta
- Order: Lepidoptera
- Family: Depressariidae
- Genus: Antaeotricha
- Species: A. caenochytis

Binomial name
- Antaeotricha caenochytis (Meyrick, 1925)

Synonyms
- Stenoma caenochytis Meyrick, 1925

Species of moth in genus Antaeotricha

Antaeotricha caenochytis is a species of moth of the family Depressariidae. It is found in Guyana and Brazil.

The wingspan is 16–17 mm for males and 18–20 mm for females. The forewings are shining white, in males with a deep groove beneath the costa from the base to the middle, containing a fringe of white hairs finely attenuated from base to three-fifths. There is a small dark fuscous mark on the base of the costa and a fuscous spot on the base of the dorsum followed by indistinct fuscous irroration on the dorsal half to one-fourth, in females sometimes forming a fuscous blotch. There are three dark fuscous transverse lines, the first from one-fifth of the costa (in males obsolete above groove) to the dorsum at two-fifths, irregular, somewhat curved, followed by a suffused quadrate dark fuscous dorsal blotch extending to the third, the third from the costa at two-thirds to the dorsum before the tornus, curved beneath. There is more or less fuscous suffusion between these lines towards the costa, in females sometimes strongly developed. The second discal stigma is merged in the second line, sometimes emitting a dark fuscous projection anteriorly. There are seven large dark fuscous marginal dots around the apex and termen. The hindwings are grey.
