= Antaeotricha prosora =

Scientific classification
- Domain: Eukaryota
- Kingdom: Animalia
- Phylum: Arthropoda
- Class: Insecta
- Order: Lepidoptera
- Family: Depressariidae
- Genus: Antaeotricha
- Species: A. prosora

Binomial name
- Antaeotricha prosora (Walsingham, 1912)

Synonyms
- Stenoma prosora Walsingham, 1912

Species of moth

Antaeotricha prosora is a moth in the family Depressariidae. It was described by Lord Walsingham in 1912. It is found in Panama.

The wingspan is about 23 mm. The forewings are bone-whitish, much suffused and transversely barred obliquely with broken brownish fuscous lines. The brownish fuscous suffusion is much more strongly shown on the dorsal than on the costal portion of the wing, but there is no clear definition of its extent, where the first two of the three transverse broken lines cross this dark shade they greatly intensify it, adding to it a slight purplish gloss. The first of these, commencing on the costa near the base, is partially reduplicated on its outer half, a branch to the extreme base being obscurely indicated, it is angulated inward on the cell, and descends to the dorsum, before the middle, in a generally oblique direction. The second commences before the middle of the costa, and after reaching the upper angle of the cell descends straight to the dorsum, somewhat dilated outward on its lower half. The third, from beyond the middle of the costa, curves outward parallel to the line of the apex and termen, reverting to the dorsum before the tornus, a similar line following the margin itself. The costa is very narrowly pale bone throughout, this line being produced through the basal half of the cilia, their outer half being pale bone-white. The hindwings are brownish grey.
