= Antaeotricha impedita =

Scientific classification
- Domain: Eukaryota
- Kingdom: Animalia
- Phylum: Arthropoda
- Class: Insecta
- Order: Lepidoptera
- Family: Depressariidae
- Genus: Antaeotricha
- Species: A. impedita

Binomial name
- Antaeotricha impedita (Meyrick, 1915)

Synonyms
- Stenoma impedita Meyrick, 1915

Species of moth

Antaeotricha impedita is a moth of the family Depressariidae. It was described by Edward Meyrick in 1915. It is found in Peru.

== Description ==
The wingspan is about 19 millimetres (0.75 in). The forewings are white with a fuscous longitudinal line from the base of the costa to one-fifth of the disc. There is some light fuscous suffusion towards the base of the dorsum and a dark fuscous dot in the disc at one-fourth, and three dark fuscous transverse lines, the first from one-fifth of the costa to two-fifths of the dorsum, interrupted in the disc, thickened on the dorsal half and followed by a quadrate dorsal patch of pale fuscous suffusion, the second from before the middle of the costa to three-fourths of the dorsum, indistinct in the disc but marked with a small dark fuscous discal spot, the third from three-fourths of the costa to the tornus, strong, somewhat sinuate in the middle and curved outwards on the lower half, the space between the second and third fuscous on the dorsal half, darkest anteriorly, with an elongate fuscous spot above it in the disc. There are six large blackish marginal dots connected with fuscous around the apex and termen. The hindwings are pale grey, with the apical margin suffused with dark fuscous.
