= Antaeotricha lecithaula =

Scientific classification
- Domain: Eukaryota
- Kingdom: Animalia
- Phylum: Arthropoda
- Class: Insecta
- Order: Lepidoptera
- Family: Depressariidae
- Genus: Antaeotricha
- Species: A. lecithaula

Binomial name
- Antaeotricha lecithaula Meyrick, 1914

Species of moth

Antaeotricha lecithaula is a species of moth in the family Depressariidae. It was described by Edward Meyrick in 1914. It is found in Guyana.

The wingspan is about 13 mm. The forewings are shining white with a very oblique fuscous line from the base of the costa terminated by a fine blackish dash on the fold and a short very oblique dark fuscous streak in the disc about one-third. There are two rather dark fuscous blotches on the dorsum reaching nearly half across the wing, the first before the middle, irregularly rounded, the second rectangular, extending from three-fourths to the tornus. A slender dark fuscous longitudinal streak is found in the disc from before the middle to two-thirds, where it meets a very oblique line from two-fifths of the costa. There is a dark fuscous slightly curved line from two-thirds of the costa to the posterior angle of the second dorsal blotch. A short dark fuscous mark is found in the disc above the middle nearly connecting this with the preceding line. There are also three strong approximated blackish dots on the apical margin, preceded by some narrow dark fuscous suffusion. The hindwings are grey, the base whitish-tinged, the apex somewhat suffused with whitish, with two dark fuscous marginal dots. There is a long whitish subcostal hairpencil lying beneath the forewings.
