= Antaeotricha plerotis =

Scientific classification
- Domain: Eukaryota
- Kingdom: Animalia
- Phylum: Arthropoda
- Class: Insecta
- Order: Lepidoptera
- Family: Depressariidae
- Genus: Antaeotricha
- Species: A. plerotis

Binomial name
- Antaeotricha plerotis Meyrick, 1925

Species of moth

Antaeotricha plerotis is a species of moth in the family Depressariidae. It was described by Edward Meyrick in 1925. It is found in Peru.

The wingspan is about 17 mm. The forewings are shining white with the costal edge pale ochreous and with an oblique dark fuscous spot from the costa at one-fourth, and a small roundish spot in the disc beyond it. A small linear somewhat oblique dark fuscous mark is found on the upper angle of the cell, and a dot on the lower somewhat beyond it. There is an oblique wedge-shaped dark fuscous spot from the costa at two-thirds with some fuscous suffusion beneath it, and a trapezoidal dark fuscous spot suffused anteriorly on the dorsum before the tornus, these representing a fascia broadly interrupted in the middle. Some fuscous irroration is found before the termen, and six dark fuscous pre-marginal dots leave the terminal edge and interspaces clear white. The hindwings are whitish suffused light greyish-ochreous on the posterior third, greyer towards the apex, the extreme apex white and the costa dilated on the anterior half, with a broad projection of white and dark grey scales before the middle, as well as a whitish-ochreous subcostal hairpencil from the base reaching to two-thirds, lying beneath the forewings.
