= Antaeotricha praerupta =

Scientific classification
- Domain: Eukaryota
- Kingdom: Animalia
- Phylum: Arthropoda
- Class: Insecta
- Order: Lepidoptera
- Family: Depressariidae
- Genus: Antaeotricha
- Species: A. praerupta

Binomial name
- Antaeotricha praerupta Meyrick, 1915

Species of moth

Antaeotricha praerupta is a moth in the family Depressariidae. It was described by Edward Meyrick in 1915. It is found in Guyana.

The wingspan is about 20 mm. The forewings are white with a basal patch of fuscous suffusion, its edge straight, running from one-fourth of the costa to one-fourth of the dorsum, marked on the costa with three suffused dark fuscous marks, and on the posterior edge with discal and dorsal dark fuscous dots, the latter followed by a ferruginous tuft. The dorsal two-thirds between this and the postmedian fascia is mostly suffused with pale brownish and there is a small blackish dot in the disc beneath the middle. A strong oblique blackish mark is found on the upper angle of the cell and a rather oblique somewhat curved fascia composed of two irregular lines of dark fuscous irroration suffused together with brownish crosses the wing behind this. There is also a brownish terminal fascia irrorated with dark fuscous, widest at the apex, narrowed to the tornus. The hindwings are pale greyish-ochreous, the posterior half suffused with grey and the costal margin expanded to beyond the middle, with long rough projecting hairscales suffused with grey beneath, and a long ochreous-whitish subcostal hairpencil lying beneath the forewings.
