= Antaeotricha intersecta =

Scientific classification
- Domain: Eukaryota
- Kingdom: Animalia
- Phylum: Arthropoda
- Class: Insecta
- Order: Lepidoptera
- Family: Depressariidae
- Genus: Antaeotricha
- Species: A. intersecta

Binomial name
- Antaeotricha intersecta (Meyrick, 1916)

Synonyms
- Stenoma intersecta Meyrick, 1916

Species of moth

Antaeotricha intersecta is a moth of the family Depressariidae. It is found in French Guiana.

The wingspan is 24–25 mm. The forewings are ochreous-white with blackish markings and with three dorsal blotches, the first narrow, from near the base to near the middle, with a longitudinal streak from its apex to near the second, the second rhomboidal, reaching nearly half across the wing, the third transverse, narrowed downwards, reaching more than half across the wing. A fine line is found along the lower margin of the cell throughout, dilated into an elongate spot before the middle of the wing and a small spot at the extremity, nearly reaching the third dorsal blotch. There is also an irregular streak from the base of this to the disc at one-third close above it and an oblique spot from the costa at one-fifth, produced along the costal edge nearly to the base. An elongate spot is found towards the costa before the middle and a larger very oblique spot across the upper angle of the cell, as well as an irregular oblique streak from beneath the costa at three-fifths to near the upper posterior angle of the third dorsal blotch and an almost terminal fascia cut by fine lines on the veins, leaving the terminal edge white. The hindwings are grey, paler towards the base.
