= Antaeotricha neocrossa =

Scientific classification
- Domain: Eukaryota
- Kingdom: Animalia
- Phylum: Arthropoda
- Class: Insecta
- Order: Lepidoptera
- Family: Depressariidae
- Genus: Antaeotricha
- Species: A. neocrossa

Binomial name
- Antaeotricha neocrossa (Meyrick, 1925)

Synonyms
- Stenoma neocrossa Meyrick, 1925; Stenopa neocrossa

Species of moth

Antaeotricha neocrossa is a moth of the family Depressariidae. It is found in Peru.

The wingspan is about 13 mm. The forewings are white, the dorsal half tinged with brownish and with a fine dark fuscous median dash near the base. The stigmata are moderate and dark fuscous, the plical rather obliquely beyond the first discal, a short oblique streak above and before the first discal pointing to it. There is an undefined patch of fuscous suffusion extending along the anterior half of the dorsum and touching the plical stigma. There are oblique transverse dark fuscous lines from the costa at the middle and three-fourths, the first straight, irregular, interrupted in the disc, nearly preceding the second discal stigma, the second curved on the lower half, the dorsal half between these forming a fuscous blotch becoming dark fuscous anteriorly. There are three pre-marginal black dots on the apical part of the costa, the lowest largest, and two or three minute and undefined ones on the termen. The hindwings are ochreous-whitish, suffused light grey posteriorly with a fringe of long raised ochreous-whitish hairs along the lower margin of the cell and basal half of vein two.
