= Antaeotricha fascicularis =

Scientific classification
- Kingdom: Animalia
- Phylum: Arthropoda
- Clade: Pancrustacea
- Class: Insecta
- Order: Lepidoptera
- Family: Depressariidae
- Genus: Antaeotricha
- Species: A. fascicularis

Binomial name
- Antaeotricha fascicularis Zeller, 1854

Synonyms
- Cryptolechia leprosa Felder & Rogenhofer, 1875; Stenoma gunni Busck, 1911; Antaeotricha leucogramma Meyrick, 1915

Species of moth

Antaeotricha fascicularis is a moth in the family Depressariidae. It was described by Philipp Christoph Zeller in 1854. It is found in Guyana, French Guiana and Brazil (Amazonas). It is located in rainforests where they can thrive due to the abundance of vegetation and a large amount of suitable host plants for the moths larvae, where the newly hatched caterpillars then feed of their host plant

The wingspan is about 30 mm. The forewings are fuscous, towards the costa anteriorly suffused with purplish, towards the costa posteriorly and termen brownish. The costal edge is dark fuscous except towards the apex and there is a white dot towards the costa at one-third and a very fine white line along the fold from the base to near the middle. The discal stigmata are obscurely darker, connected by a white line, the second followed by a short white dash. There are several white dashes between the second discal and the tornus. A cloudy somewhat interrupted curved white line is found from beneath the costa at four-fifths to the tornus. The hindwings are fuscous, rather darker posteriorly.
