= Antaeotricha cantharitis =

Scientific classification
- Kingdom: Animalia
- Phylum: Arthropoda
- Clade: Pancrustacea
- Class: Insecta
- Order: Lepidoptera
- Family: Depressariidae
- Genus: Antaeotricha
- Species: A. cantharitis

Binomial name
- Antaeotricha cantharitis (Meyrick, 1916)

Synonyms
- Aphanoxena cantharitis Meyrick, 1916; Alphanoxena cantharitis

Species of moth in genus Antaeotricha

Antaeotricha cantharitis is a moth of the family Depressariidae. It is found in French Guiana.

The wingspan is 17–18 mm. The forewings are white with a dark fuscous basal patch suffused with purplish-leaden-metallic occupying one-fourth of the wing, with the edge irregular and vertical. There is a fine transverse-linear blackish mark in the disc near beyond this and a broad very irregular somewhat oblique postmedian fascia of grey suffusion, with a strong somewhat oblique transverse black mark on its posterior edge in the disc, and a small spot of pale ochreous suffusion near before this. The apical fourth is grey, with a thick whitish line from five-sixths of the costa to the tornus, indented beneath the costa, and a fine whitish line just before the termen, terminal edge suffused with dark fuscous. The hindwings are grey, thinly scaled at the base and with the costal margin expanded from the base to two-thirds, with long rough projecting white scales suffused with purplish-grey beneath, and a long whitish subcostal hairpencil from the base lying beneath the forewings.
