= Antaeotricha nuclearis =

Scientific classification
- Kingdom: Animalia
- Phylum: Arthropoda
- Clade: Pancrustacea
- Class: Insecta
- Order: Lepidoptera
- Family: Depressariidae
- Genus: Antaeotricha
- Species: A. nuclearis

Binomial name
- Antaeotricha nuclearis Meyrick, 1913

Species of moth

Antaeotricha nuclearis is a moth in the family Depressariidae. It was described by Edward Meyrick in 1913. It is found in Peru.

The wingspan is 25–26 mm. The forewings are white with the dorsal half suffused with pale fuscous, obscurely spotted with darker and a fuscous basal patch occupying one-fourth of the wing, irregularly spotted with blackish irroration, terminated on the dorsum by a ferruginous mark. There is a faint pale fuscous cloud towards the costa in the middle. The second discal stigma is represented by a triangular-crescentic blackish mark, surrounded posteriorly by a semicircle of five cloudy dots of blackish irroration, the fourth tinged with yellowish. The apical area beyond the second discal stigma is wholly suffused with light fuscous and sprinkled with blackish, crossed by a nearly straight whitish line from a triangular spot on the costa at four-fifths to the tornus. The hindwings are whitish-fuscous, becoming light fuscous posteriorly. The costa anteriorly is broadly dilated and tufted with grey and white projecting scales towards one-third, above with a long dark grey hairpencil from the base lying in a subcostal groove, clothed with whitish hairs.
