= Antaeotricha deltopis =

Scientific classification
- Kingdom: Animalia
- Phylum: Arthropoda
- Class: Insecta
- Order: Lepidoptera
- Family: Depressariidae
- Genus: Antaeotricha
- Species: A. deltopis

Binomial name
- Antaeotricha deltopis Meyrick, 1915

Species of moth

Antaeotricha deltopis is a moth of the family Depressariidae. It is found in Guyana, French Guiana and Brazil.

The wingspan is 17–20 mm. The forewings are white, on the dorsal half faintly grey-tinged and with a dark fuscous oblique mark on the base of the costa, and another at one-fifth. There is a subtriangular dark fuscous blotch in the disc at one-fourth and a transverse dark fuscous mark on the end of the cell, as well as a dark fuscous mark on the middle of the costa, where an irregular dentate interrupted or partially obsolete fuscous line runs to four-fifths of the dorsum, excurved in the disc. A very faint greyish fascia is found between this and the termen, becoming obsolete towards the costa. There is a series of dark fuscous marks around the posterior part of the costa and termen, on the costa connected by pre-marginal fuscous dots. The hindwings are ochreous-whitish, tinged with grey on the dorsal half, the costal margin expanded from the base to two-thirds, with very long rough projecting hairscales, whitish above and dark grey beneath, and with projecting cilia before the apex, so as to appear excavated between these, and with a long subcostal pencil of whitish-ochreous hairs lying beneath the forewings.
