= Antaeotricha epignampta =

Scientific classification
- Domain: Eukaryota
- Kingdom: Animalia
- Phylum: Arthropoda
- Class: Insecta
- Order: Lepidoptera
- Family: Depressariidae
- Genus: Antaeotricha
- Species: A. epignampta

Binomial name
- Antaeotricha epignampta Meyrick, 1915

Species of moth

Antaeotricha epignampta is a moth in the family Depressariidae. It was described by Edward Meyrick in 1915. It is found in Peru.

The wingspan is about 19 mm. The forewings are white with a narrow dark grey streak along the costa from the base to beyond one-fourth, with a short projection from its middle, and a rather oblique grey line from its apex reaching to the fold, as well as a somewhat oblique transverse dark grey mark on the end of the cell. There are small rather dark fuscous spots on the dorsum at three-fifths and four-fifths, and small fuscous spots on the costa beyond the middle and at three-fourths. A somewhat curved transverse fuscous shade is found behind the discal spot, the extremities directed towards but not reaching the first costal and second dorsal spots, and a rather curved shade from beneath the second costal spot to the dorsum before the tornus. There is a fuscous fascia around the apical part of the costa and termen, narrowed downwards, leaving the terminal edge whitish. The hindwings are whitish-ochreous-grey, with the costal margin rather expanded to beyond the middle, with long rough hairscales suffused with grey beneath, and a long whitish subcostal hairpencil lying beneath the forewings.
