= Antaeotricha encyclia =

Scientific classification
- Domain: Eukaryota
- Kingdom: Animalia
- Phylum: Arthropoda
- Class: Insecta
- Order: Lepidoptera
- Family: Depressariidae
- Genus: Antaeotricha
- Species: A. encyclia

Binomial name
- Antaeotricha encyclia Meyrick, 1915

Species of moth

Antaeotricha encyclia is a species of moth in the family Depressariidae. It was described by Edward Meyrick in 1915. It is found in Colombia.

The wingspan is about 28 mm. The forewings are ochreous-whitish with a rounded dark fuscous spot on the base of the costa, and one rather smaller at one-sixth. There is an ochreous-yellow scale-projection on the dorsal edge at one-third and an indistinct streak of brownish and dark fuscous scales running from the first costal spot to this, a spot towards the costa at one-third, one on the fold beneath this, one in the disc before the middle, one on the dorsum beyond the middle, a curved series of cloudy marks from beneath the costa before the middle to the dorsum at four-fifths, preceded by two transversely placed cloudy dark grey dots on the end of the cell. There are subterminal and terminal fasciae of fuscous suffusion, the first not reaching the costa and the terminal area is yellowish-tinged. The hindwings are whitish-grey, the costal margin expanded to the middle, with long projecting ochreous-whitish hairscales suffused with grey beneath, and a moderately long ochreous-whitish subcostal hairpencil lying beneath the forewings.
