= Antaeotricha phollicodes =

Scientific classification
- Domain: Eukaryota
- Kingdom: Animalia
- Phylum: Arthropoda
- Class: Insecta
- Order: Lepidoptera
- Family: Depressariidae
- Genus: Antaeotricha
- Species: A. phollicodes

Binomial name
- Antaeotricha phollicodes (Meyrick, 1916)

Synonyms
- Stenoma phollicodes Meyrick, 1916

Species of moth

Antaeotricha phollicodes is a moth of the family Depressariidae. It is found in French Guiana.

The wingspan is 19 mm for males and 22 mm for females. The forewings are light ochre-grey, sprinkled with dark fuscous or blackish, and with dark fuscous dots on the costa at the base and one-fifth. The stigmata are cloudy and dark fuscous, the plical obliquely beyond the first discal, the second discal transverse, edged with whitish anteriorly. There is a small spot of white irroration surrounded by dark fuscous suffusion in the middle of the dorsum and an irregular line of cloudy dark fuscous marks edged anteriorly with white irroration, from two-fifths of the costa very obliquely outwards to beyond the cell, then downwards to the dorsum. A fine dark fuscous streak is found along the costal sinuation, and there is an indistinct curved waved fuscous line from the three-fourths of the costa to the tornus. The apical space beyond this irradiated with white. A marginal series of cloudy, dark fuscous dots is found around the apical part of the costa and termen. The hindwings are grey and blue.
