= Antaeotricha astynoma =

Scientific classification
- Kingdom: Animalia
- Phylum: Arthropoda
- Clade: Pancrustacea
- Class: Insecta
- Order: Lepidoptera
- Family: Depressariidae
- Genus: Antaeotricha
- Species: A. astynoma

Binomial name
- Antaeotricha astynoma (Meyrick, 1915)

Synonyms
- Aphanoxena astynoma Meyrick, 1915

Species of moth in genus Antaeotricha

Antaeotricha astynoma is a species of moth of the family Depressariidae. It is found in Guyana.

The wingspan is about 18 mm. The forewings are pale yellow-ochreous, the costal third white from the base to four-fifths. There is a slender blackish longitudinal streak from the base of the costa to the disc beyond one-fourth, a short one in the disc from just beneath the apex of this, and one towards the costa from before the middle to near two-thirds. A dark fuscous elongate blotch extends along the dorsum from the base to beyond the middle, widest posteriorly, where it reaches half across the wing, its posterior edge rather oblique inwards from the dorsum. There is a rectangular dark fuscous tornal blotch extending from three-fourths of the dorsum to the termen and reaching two-thirds across the wing, the sides rather convex and the posterior only reaching the termen near the tornus. A short dark fuscous dash is found near the costa before the apex and there are some dark fuscous marginal dots around the apex and termen. The hindwings are grey with a long whitish subcostal hairpencil lying beneath the forewings.
