= Antaeotricha coriodes =

Scientific classification
- Domain: Eukaryota
- Kingdom: Animalia
- Phylum: Arthropoda
- Class: Insecta
- Order: Lepidoptera
- Family: Depressariidae
- Genus: Antaeotricha
- Species: A. coriodes

Binomial name
- Antaeotricha coriodes Meyrick, 1915

Species of moth

Antaeotricha coriodes is a moth in the family Depressariidae. It was described by Edward Meyrick in 1915. It is found in Guyana.

The wingspan is 16–17 mm. The forewings are white, tinged in the disc with ochreous and with a broad dark bronzy-purplish fascia near the base, leaving a slender whitish basal space obscurely marked with dark grey, the outer edge of the fascia irregular, hardly oblique, but on the dorsal half followed by irregular grey suffusion extending beneath the fold to the tornus, on the dorsum suffusedly spotted with dark fuscous before and beyond the middle. There are two dark fuscous dots transversely placed on the end of the cell and there is a straight transverse grey shade at four-fifths, more or less enlarged anteriorly into a blotch on the costa. Some undefined grey suffusion is found before the apex and termen, preceding a white dentate marginal line with interspaces filled with dark fuscous. The hindwings are grey, paler anteriorly and with the costal margin somewhat expanded to beyond the middle, with long rough projecting hairscales suffused with dark grey beneath, and a long ochreous-white subcostal hairpencil lying beneath the forewings.
