= Antaeotricha euthrinca =

Scientific classification
- Domain: Eukaryota
- Kingdom: Animalia
- Phylum: Arthropoda
- Class: Insecta
- Order: Lepidoptera
- Family: Depressariidae
- Genus: Antaeotricha
- Species: A. euthrinca

Binomial name
- Antaeotricha euthrinca Meyrick, 1915

Species of moth

Antaeotricha euthrinca is a species of moth in the family Depressariidae. It was described by Edward Meyrick in 1915. It is found in Colombia.

The wingspan is 28–29 mm. The forewings are whitish, tinged with ochreous in the disc and with a dark purple-fuscous streak along the basal fifth of the costa, with three irregular projections beneath. There are dark grey dots on the fold near the base and at one-fourth and violet-ferruginous projecting scales from the dorsum from near the base to one-third, with a dark fuscous dorsal spot at one-fourth. The dorsal two-fifths is suffused with pale greyish from beyond this to a small dark grey dorsal spot at three-fourths and there are two blackish dots transversely placed on the end of the cell. An oblique irregular light grey shade from the middle of the costa is curved round behind these dots and there are two narrow light grey fasciae between this and the termen, not reaching the costa. The hindwings are light grey, paler towards the base and with the costal margin somewhat expanded to beyond the middle, with long rough projecting hairscales suffused with grey beneath, and a moderately long whitish subcostal hairpencil lying beneath the forewings.
