= Antaeotricha vannifera =

Scientific classification
- Domain: Eukaryota
- Kingdom: Animalia
- Phylum: Arthropoda
- Class: Insecta
- Order: Lepidoptera
- Family: Depressariidae
- Genus: Antaeotricha
- Species: A. vannifera

Binomial name
- Antaeotricha vannifera (Meyrick, 1915)

Synonyms
- Stenoma vannifera Meyrick, 1915; Stenoma asphalopis Meyrick, 1925

Species of moth

Antaeotricha vannifera is a species of moth of the family Depressariidae. It is found in Peru and French Guiana.

The wingspan is 14–15 mm. The forewings are white with a short dark fuscous oblique mark on the base of the costa and a dark fuscous longitudinal median line from the base to one-third, the space beneath it infuscated. There is a dark fuscous elongate spot on the base of the dorsum and an irregular dark fuscous blotch on the dorsum at one-third, and a larger subtriangular one at two-thirds, their apices connected by an interrupted dark fuscous streak. A short dark fuscous longitudinal mark is found in the disc before the middle and a straight very oblique dark fuscous line from before the middle of the costa to above the apex of the second dorsal blotch. There is a dark fuscous line from three-fourths of the costa to the tornus, curved at the lower extremity and there are three large angular black dots on the apical margin, the central largest and bilobed. The hindwings are whitish, somewhat tinged with grey before the apex and towards the middle of the termen.
