= Antaeotricha lophosaris =

Scientific classification
- Domain: Eukaryota
- Kingdom: Animalia
- Phylum: Arthropoda
- Class: Insecta
- Order: Lepidoptera
- Family: Depressariidae
- Genus: Antaeotricha
- Species: A. lophosaris

Binomial name
- Antaeotricha lophosaris (Meyrick, 1925)

Synonyms
- Stenoma lophosaris Meyrick, 1925

Species of moth

Antaeotricha lophosaris is a species of moth of the family Depressariidae. It is found in Brazil.

The wingspan is about 14 mm. The forewings are whitish, the dorsal half irregularly suffused light fuscous with an appressed fringe of dense whitish-ochreous expansible hairscales just beneath the costa from the base to near the middle. There is a dark fuscous dash beneath and partly concealed by this towards the base. The stigmata are moderately large, elongate and dark fuscous, the plical obliquely beyond the first discal, a suffused fuscous spot on the middle of the dorsum in a line with these, the second discal with a projecting dash anteriorly, followed by a dash towards the apex, and traversed by a curved oblique fuscous line from beneath the middle of the costa to a triangular fuscous pre-tornal blotch. An indistinct interrupted curved fuscous line is found from the costa at three-fourths to the tornus, darker on the costa. There are also large dark fuscous dots at the apex and middle of the termen, and three smaller ones on the costa towards the apex. The hindwings are grey.
