= Antaeotricha brochota =

Scientific classification
- Kingdom: Animalia
- Phylum: Arthropoda
- Clade: Pancrustacea
- Class: Insecta
- Order: Lepidoptera
- Family: Depressariidae
- Genus: Antaeotricha
- Species: A. brochota

Binomial name
- Antaeotricha brochota Meyrick, 1915

Species of moth in genus Antaeotricha

Antaeotricha brochota is a moth in the family Depressariidae. It was described by Edward Meyrick in 1915. It is found in Peru.

The wingspan is about 22 mm. The forewings are white with a light grey basal patch including three darker grey shades, the outer edge running from beyond one-fourth of the costa to beyond one-third of the dorsum, obtusely angulated on the fold, followed on the dorsal half by irregular light brownish-grey suffusion extending to beyond the middle. There is an irregular curved grey line from beyond the middle of the costa to four-fifths of the dorsum, suffusedly connected with two dots transversely placed on the end of the cell, so as to form a transverse-oval loop. There is a dark grey terminal fascia, narrowed to the tornus, separated by a white line from a pale grey preceding shade not reaching the costa. The hindwings are grey, paler anteriorly and with the costal margin expanded from the base to two-thirds, with long rough projecting hairscales suffused with dark grey beneath, and a long ochreous-whitish subcostal hairpencil with pale yellow-ochreous hairpencil beneath it lying beneath the forewings.
