= Antaeotricha phaeoplintha =

Scientific classification
- Domain: Eukaryota
- Kingdom: Animalia
- Phylum: Arthropoda
- Class: Insecta
- Order: Lepidoptera
- Family: Depressariidae
- Genus: Antaeotricha
- Species: A. phaeoplintha

Binomial name
- Antaeotricha phaeoplintha (Meyrick, 1915)

Synonyms
- Stenoma phaeoplintha Meyrick, 1915

Species of moth

Antaeotricha phaeoplintha is a moth of the family Depressariidae. It is found in Guyana, French Guiana and Brazil.

The wingspan is 13–14 mm. The forewings are white, variably sprinkled with grey in the disc and with a dark fuscous mark on the base of the costa reaching half across the wing. There are three equal quadrate dark fuscous dorsal blotches extending from the base to the tornus and nearly meeting, reaching half across the wing. A blackish dash above the first blotch is found near the base and there are three oblique dark fuscous streaks from the costa, the first running to the anterior angle of the second blotch, the second irregular, not reaching a small elongate dark fuscous spot lying above the anterior angle of the third blotch, the third strong, almost straight but faintly sinuate in the middle, running to the termen below the middle and limiting the third blotch, preceded by more or less dark fuscous suffusion on the upper half except on the costa. There are seven large black marginal dots around the posterior part of the costa and termen. The hindwings are grey, in females rather darker.
