= Antaeotricha colposaris =

Scientific classification
- Domain: Eukaryota
- Kingdom: Animalia
- Phylum: Arthropoda
- Class: Insecta
- Order: Lepidoptera
- Family: Depressariidae
- Genus: Antaeotricha
- Species: A. colposaris

Binomial name
- Antaeotricha colposaris (Meyrick, 1925)

Synonyms
- Stenoma colposaris Meyrick, 1925

Species of moth

Antaeotricha colposaris is a moth of the family Depressariidae. It is found in Brazil (Amazonas).

The wingspan is 12–13 mm. The forewings are white, in females rather mixed grey except on the costa and in males with a costal fold from the base to the middle, filled with long expansible whitish-ochreous hairs. There is a dark fuscous supramedian dash from the base of the costa, in males almost concealed and in females a short oblique dark fuscous line from the costa at one-fifth. There is a dark fuscous median streak from just beyond the basal dash to near the apex, the dorsal half of the wing suffused fuscous, in males not quite reaching this streak except on the posterior third, a dark fuscous suffused blotch on the middle of the dorsum, and an inwards-oblique spot from before the tornus. There is a very oblique dark fuscous line from the middle of the costa to the median streak, and one from the costa at three-fourths slightly curved to the termen above the tornus limiting the fuscous area. Five blackish marginal dots are found around the apex and termen. The hindwings are grey, darker in females.
