= Antaeotricha desecta =

Scientific classification
- Domain: Eukaryota
- Kingdom: Animalia
- Phylum: Arthropoda
- Class: Insecta
- Order: Lepidoptera
- Family: Depressariidae
- Genus: Antaeotricha
- Species: A. desecta

Binomial name
- Antaeotricha desecta (Meyrick, 1918)

Synonyms
- Stenoma desecta Meyrick, 1918

Species of moth

Antaeotricha desecta is a moth in the family Depressariidae. It was described by Edward Meyrick in 1918. It is found in French Guiana.

The wingspan is 17–18 mm. The forewings are shining white, the dorsal half whitish-fuscous. There is a fine dark fuscous dash near the base above the middle and a subquadrate dark fuscous blotch on the middle of the dorsum reaching anteriorly half across the wing, its upper anterior angle somewhat produced and preceded in the disc by a small dark fuscous mark. A quadrate dark fuscous blotch is found on the dorsum before the tornus, not reaching half across the wing, the upper anterior angle connected with a dark fuscous transverse mark in the disc from which an indistinct fuscous line runs towards the middle of the costa, not reaching it. There is also a nearly straight slightly irregular rather dark fuscous line from three-fourths of the costa to the tornus, the lower extremity triangularly enlarged. Six or seven blackish marginal dots or marks are found around the apex and termen. The hindwings are light grey.
