= Antaeotricha hydrophora =

Scientific classification
- Domain: Eukaryota
- Kingdom: Animalia
- Phylum: Arthropoda
- Class: Insecta
- Order: Lepidoptera
- Family: Depressariidae
- Genus: Antaeotricha
- Species: A. hydrophora

Binomial name
- Antaeotricha hydrophora Meyrick, 1925

Species of moth

Antaeotricha hydrophora is a species of moth in the family Depressariidae. It was described by Edward Meyrick in 1925. It is found in Peru.

The wingspan is about 13 mm. The forewings are shining white with a minute blackish dot on the costa near the base, and three minute fuscous dashes between this and the dorsum, as well as a very irregular interrupted oblique dark fuscous streak from the costa at one-fourth towards a dark fuscous transverse blotch on the middle of the dorsum, and a similar streak from the middle of the costa, with a rather large second discal stigma adjacent posteriorly, directed towards the anterior angle of a quadrate blotch on the dorsum towards the tornus, a nearly straight dark fuscous hardly oblique line from a spot on the costa at three-fourths to the posterior angle of the same blotch, some fuscous irroration preceding this towards the costa. There are six rather large black terminal dots preceded by some fuscous irroration. The hindwings are grey, darker posteriorly. The costa is slightly dilated anteriorly, with a whitish-ochreous expansible costal hairpencil from the base to the middle.
