= Antaeotricha trisecta =

Scientific classification
- Kingdom: Animalia
- Phylum: Arthropoda
- Class: Insecta
- Order: Lepidoptera
- Family: Depressariidae
- Genus: Antaeotricha
- Species: A. trisecta

Binomial name
- Antaeotricha trisecta (Walsingham, 1912)

Synonyms
- Athleta trisecta Walsingham, 1912

Species of moth

Antaeotricha trisecta is a moth in the family Depressariidae. It was described by Lord Walsingham in 1912. It is found in Mexico (Tabasco) and Guatemala.

The wingspan is about 18 mm. The forewings are shining, silvery white, with a broad dark mouse-grey patch along the dorsum, somewhat dilated from the base below the fold, crossing the middle of the fold and abruptly ending with a convex margin two-thirds of the distance between the cell and the termen, where it extends fully as high as the upper edge of the cell. A slender line continues the curve of its outer margin to the costa. This patch is twice interrupted by the white ground colour, first at about one-third, secondly beyond the middle, after each interruption a curved line of the dark mouse-grey scales is produced backward from the inner edge of the patch beyond, the first of these lines sometimes forming a semi-detached streak, nearly reaching to the base of the wing. Around the termen and apex is a slight clouding of dark mouse-grey scales forming a series of connected spots between the veins. The hindwings are pale brownish grey.
