= Antaeotricha tribomias =

Scientific classification
- Kingdom: Animalia
- Phylum: Arthropoda
- Clade: Pancrustacea
- Class: Insecta
- Order: Lepidoptera
- Family: Depressariidae
- Genus: Antaeotricha
- Species: A. tribomias

Binomial name
- Antaeotricha tribomias (Meyrick, 1915)

Synonyms
- Stenoma tribomias Meyrick, 1915

Species of moth

Antaeotricha tribomias is a species of moth of the family Depressariidae. It is found in Guyana.

The wingspan is about 19 mm. The forewings are ochreous-white with a transverse dark fuscous mark from the base of the costa, almost connected with a slender dark fuscous longitudinal median streak from near the base to one-third and three dark fuscous rectangular dorsal blotches, the interspaces pale brownish, the first extending from the base to one-fourth, narrowed basally, the second from one-third to beyond the middle, reaching half across the wing, the third from two-thirds to the tornus, reaching somewhat more than half across the wing. There is a small dark fuscous spot above the middle of the wing, and a larger elongate one beyond and somewhat below it. A dark fuscous line is found from three-fourths of the costa to the posterior angle of the third dorsal blotch and there are six dark fuscous marginal dots around the apex and termen. The hindwings are whitish, with some faint greyish suffusion before the apex and towards the middle of the termen.
