= Antaeotricha ogmosaris =

Scientific classification
- Domain: Eukaryota
- Kingdom: Animalia
- Phylum: Arthropoda
- Class: Insecta
- Order: Lepidoptera
- Family: Depressariidae
- Genus: Antaeotricha
- Species: A. ogmosaris

Binomial name
- Antaeotricha ogmosaris (Meyrick, 1915)

Synonyms
- Stenoma ogmosaris Meyrick, 1915

Species of moth

Antaeotricha ogmosaris is a moth in the family Depressariidae. It was described by Edward Meyrick in 1915. It is found in Guyana.

The wingspan is about 15 mm. The forewings are shining white with a small fuscous mark on the base of the costa and a subcostal groove on the basal third, containing a fine whitish expansible hairpencil. An elongate fuscous spot extends along the dorsum from the base to one-fourth and there is a cloudy dark fuscous dot in the disc at one-fourth, with some scattered fuscous scales before and beyond it. Two quadrate fuscous dorsal blotches reach half across the wing, the first about the middle, the second pre-tornal. The second discal stigma is dark fuscous, emitting a fine dash anteriorly and there is a somewhat curved dark fuscous line from two-thirds of the costa to the posterior angle of the pre-tornal blotch and there are five blackish marginal dots around the apex, the apical largest. The hindwings are grey-whitish.
