= Antaeotricha nimbata =

Scientific classification
- Domain: Eukaryota
- Kingdom: Animalia
- Phylum: Arthropoda
- Class: Insecta
- Order: Lepidoptera
- Family: Depressariidae
- Genus: Antaeotricha
- Species: A. nimbata

Binomial name
- Antaeotricha nimbata Meyrick, 1925

Species of moth

Antaeotricha nimbata is a moth in the family Depressariidae. It was described by Edward Meyrick in 1925. It is found in Peru.

The wingspan is about 14 mm. The forewings are grey, the costal area from the base ochreous-whitish attenuated to two-thirds. From just beneath the basal half of the costa is a dense fringe of downwards-directed expansible pale ochreous hairs and there is a cloudy streak of dark grey suffusion extending along the dorsum from near the base to beyond the middle, and a triangular blotch about three-fourths. The stigmata are cloudy and dark fuscous, the plical obliquely beyond the first discal, these rather large, the second discal smaller, a slightly curved dark fuscous line from the middle of the costa to this. Beyond a somewhat sinuate dark fuscous line from costa at three-fourths to the tornus, the posterior area is grey-whitish and there is a large blackish apical dot, and three smaller marginal on each side of it. The hindwings are dark fuscous with a whitish-ochreous expansible subcostal hairpencil from the base to two-thirds.
