= Antaeotricha episimbla =

Scientific classification
- Domain: Eukaryota
- Kingdom: Animalia
- Phylum: Arthropoda
- Class: Insecta
- Order: Lepidoptera
- Family: Depressariidae
- Genus: Antaeotricha
- Species: A. episimbla

Binomial name
- Antaeotricha episimbla (Meyrick, 1915)

Synonyms
- Aphanoxena episimbla Meyrick, 1915

Species of moth

Antaeotricha episimbla is a moth of the family Depressariidae. It is found in Guyana.

The wingspan is 15–17 mm. The forewings are white, faintly ochreous-tinged in the disc and with three or four small grey spots in the disc towards the base and a rounded-triangular grey or fuscous blotch suffused with black on the dorsum before the middle, not reaching half across the wing, preceded by a blackish strigula. There is an oblique grey or fuscous streak from the middle of the costa reaching half across the wing, with an irregular mark beneath its apex, an oblique mark beyond its apex, and a small spot on the dorsum opposite to it. A fine fuscous line is found from five-sixths of the costa to the tornus, indented above the middle and there is an irregular transverse deep brown blotch sprinkled anteriorly with blackish and whitish occupying the area between this and the apex except the margins, with a black dot at the apex of the wing. The hindwings are ochreous-whitish, on the posterior half greyish tinged.
