= Antaeotricha deridens =

Scientific classification
- Domain: Eukaryota
- Kingdom: Animalia
- Phylum: Arthropoda
- Class: Insecta
- Order: Lepidoptera
- Family: Depressariidae
- Genus: Antaeotricha
- Species: A. deridens

Binomial name
- Antaeotricha deridens Meyrick, 1925

Species of moth

Antaeotricha deridens is a moth in the family Depressariidae. It was described by Edward Meyrick in 1925. It is found in Bolivia.

The wingspan is about 20 mm. The forewings are light grey with the basal fourth irregularly mixed blackish, followed by a transverse strigula of blackish irroration in the disc above the middle, above this the costa is shortly suffused white and there is an undefined band of irregular blackish irroration with some ferruginous scales crossing the wing from the middle of the costa to two-thirds of the dorsum, the second discal stigma forming an oblique wedge-shaped blackish spot on the posterior edge of this, surrounded with some ferruginous suffusion, beyond this some white suffusion along the costa. A slightly curved cloudy white dotted line is found from four-fifths of the costa to the tornus, indented near the costa. Beyond this is some blackish sprinkling, and towards the costa some ferruginous irroration, a cloudy whitish line before the margin. The hindwings are dark grey with a long expansible whitish hairpencil from the base lying along the costa beneath the forewings.
