= Antaeotricha diplarcha =

Scientific classification
- Domain: Eukaryota
- Kingdom: Animalia
- Phylum: Arthropoda
- Class: Insecta
- Order: Lepidoptera
- Family: Depressariidae
- Genus: Antaeotricha
- Species: A. diplarcha

Binomial name
- Antaeotricha diplarcha Meyrick, 1915

Synonyms
- Antaeotricha arachniotis Meyrick, 1930

Species of moth

Antaeotricha diplarcha is a moth in the family Depressariidae. It was described by Edward Meyrick in 1915. It is found in Guyana and Brazil (Para).

The wingspan is about 23 mm. The forewings are pale fuscous with two very irregular curved oblique thick subconfluent dark fuscous shades from the costa about one-fifth reaching half across the wing and the dorsum with projecting whitish-ochreous scales on the basal third. There are two short inwardly oblique dark fuscous streaks from the dorsum about three-fourths and some indefinite cloudy whitish dots in the disc, and two strongly curved cloudy whitish waved shades or series of spots from about the middle of the costa to the dorsum before the tornus. The costa posteriorly and the termen are suffused with pale ochreous. The hindwings are grey with the costal margin expanded to the middle, with long projecting dark grey hairscales, and a long whitish subcostal hairpencil lying beneath the forewings.
