= Antaeotricha hemiscia =

Scientific classification
- Domain: Eukaryota
- Kingdom: Animalia
- Phylum: Arthropoda
- Class: Insecta
- Order: Lepidoptera
- Family: Depressariidae
- Genus: Antaeotricha
- Species: A. hemiscia

Binomial name
- Antaeotricha hemiscia (Walsingham, 1912)

Synonyms
- Stenoma hemiscia Walsingham, 1912

Species of moth

Antaeotricha hemiscia is a moth in the family Depressariidae. It was described by Lord Walsingham in 1912. It is found in Guatemala.

The wingspan is about 26 mm. The forewings are rather shining, white, with a smoky greyish fuscous suffusion along the dorsal half, dilated upward to the apex and mottled throughout with a darker shade of the same colour. This darker mottling is reproduced on the whiter costal half in a costal spot at one-third, almost connected obliquely by a paler shade to the upper edge of the cell, in a paler, outwardly oblique, shade from the middle of the costa to the upper angle of the cell, and in another costal spot a little beyond it, on the outer side of which some white scaling is continued in an outwardly curved line through the fuscous suffusion to the tornus. There is no clear definition of the suffused portion of the wing, the white ground colour blending with it and to some extent contributing to its mottled appearance. The hindwings are pale brownish fuscous.
