= Antaeotricha lucrosa =

Scientific classification
- Domain: Eukaryota
- Kingdom: Animalia
- Phylum: Arthropoda
- Class: Insecta
- Order: Lepidoptera
- Family: Depressariidae
- Genus: Antaeotricha
- Species: A. lucrosa

Binomial name
- Antaeotricha lucrosa (Meyrick, 1925)

Synonyms
- Stenoma lucrosa Meyrick, 1925

Species of moth

Antaeotricha lucrosa is a moth of the family Depressariidae. It is found in Brazil (Para).

The wingspan is 14–15 mm for males and 16 mm for females. The forewings are whitish-ochreous, more or less tinged or mixed light fuscous except towards the costa anteriorly, the dorsal half suffused light fuscous. There is a short dark fuscous transverse mark at the base of the costa, and a supramedian dash near the base almost touching this. There are three irregular oblique transverse fuscous lines from dark fuscous marks on the costa at one-fourth, the middle, and three-fourths, the first traversing but more or less interrupted above and below the first discal stigma, which is large, dark fuscous, irregular-oval, the second discal stigma on the second line is smaller, dark fuscous and elongate, the third line slightly sinuate, running to the termen above the tornus. There is a marginal series of blackish dots around the apex and termen. The hindwings are light grey.
