= Antaeotricha cathagnista =

Scientific classification
- Domain: Eukaryota
- Kingdom: Animalia
- Phylum: Arthropoda
- Class: Insecta
- Order: Lepidoptera
- Family: Depressariidae
- Genus: Antaeotricha
- Species: A. cathagnista

Binomial name
- Antaeotricha cathagnista Meyrick, 1925

Species of moth

Antaeotricha cathagnista is a species of moth in the family Depressariidae. It was described by Edward Meyrick in 1925. It is found in Brazil.

The wingspan is 15–17 mm. The forewings are shining white with a grey oblique spot from the costa at one-fourth, and a roundish spot in the disc beyond it. There are two dark fuscous dots transversely placed on the end of the cell, the upper slightly anterior. A fuscous fascia is found from two-thirds of the costa to the dorsum before the tornus, darkest on the costa, suffused anteriorly and somewhat interrupted in the middle. A toothed white marginal line is found around the apex and termen edged by dark fuscous suffusion preceded by fuscous irroration, strongest towards the apex. The hindwings are whitish tinged grey towards the apex, with the costa expanded on the anterior half, with a strong broad projection of dark grey and white scales before the middle and a whitish-ochreous hairpencil in the subcostal groove from the base to three-fourths lying beneath the forewings.
