= Antaeotricha constricta =

Scientific classification
- Domain: Eukaryota
- Kingdom: Animalia
- Phylum: Arthropoda
- Class: Insecta
- Order: Lepidoptera
- Family: Depressariidae
- Genus: Antaeotricha
- Species: A. constricta

Binomial name
- Antaeotricha constricta (Meyrick, 1925)

Synonyms
- Stenoma constricta Meyrick, 1925

Species of moth

Antaeotricha constricta is a species of moth of the family Depressariidae. It is found in Colombia.

The wingspan is about 24 mm. The forewings are whitish, irregularly sprinkled pale brownish, the dorsal half mostly suffused light brownish, between second and third shades extending three-fourths across the wing, the costal edge white. There is an elongate brownish spot below the costa at the base and there are three irregular waved brownish shades partially sprinkled dark fuscous, the first from the costa at one-fourth to before the middle of the dorsum, the second from before the middle of the costa obliquely excurved to the dorsum at three-fourths, the third from before two-thirds of the costa obliquely excurved to before the tornus. The stigmata are indicated by dark fuscous irroration, the plical and first discal elongate, on the first shade, the second discal dot-like on the second. A marginal series of dark fuscous dots is found around the posterior part of the costa and termen. The hindwings are ochreous-whitish.
