= Antaeotricha phaula =

Scientific classification
- Domain: Eukaryota
- Kingdom: Animalia
- Phylum: Arthropoda
- Class: Insecta
- Order: Lepidoptera
- Family: Depressariidae
- Genus: Antaeotricha
- Species: A. phaula

Binomial name
- Antaeotricha phaula (Walsingham, 1912)

Synonyms
- Stenoma phaula Walsingham, 1912

Species of moth

Antaeotricha phaula is a moth in the family Depressariidae. It was described by Lord Walsingham in 1912. It is found in Guatemala.

The wingspan is about 23 mm. The forewings are very pale brownish ochreous, smeared on the dorsal half with brownish grey, with three oblique transverse broken lines of darker greyish brown, slightly waved in their course, but not angulated or bowed outward (as in several species of different genera extremely similar in colouring and appearance). The first line, starting from the costa at one-fifth reaches the dorsum scarcely before the middle, absorbing the first plical and discal spots if any existed. The second line, from the middle of the costa to the dorsum before the tornus, leaving in its course the outer discal spot somewhat distinct. The third line, halfway between the secondhand the apex, slightly reverting toward the tornus on its lower half and followed by a series of seven dark marginal spots before the pale brownish ochreous cilia. The hindwings are brownish grey.
