= Antaeotricha isoplintha =

Scientific classification
- Domain: Eukaryota
- Kingdom: Animalia
- Phylum: Arthropoda
- Class: Insecta
- Order: Lepidoptera
- Family: Depressariidae
- Genus: Antaeotricha
- Species: A. isoplintha

Binomial name
- Antaeotricha isoplintha (Meyrick, 1925)

Synonyms
- Stenoma isoplintha Meyrick, 1925; Stenopa isoplintha

Species of moth

Antaeotricha isoplintha is a moth of the family Depressariidae. It is found in Brazil (Para).

The wingspan is 22–23 mm. The forewings are white, in females tinged ochreous except on the costa. The dorsal half is ochreous-whitish, mainly occupied by three subquadrate dark grey blotches. In females, undefined longitudinal streaks of greyish suffusion are found anteriorly beneath the costa and above the middle. There is a better-marked longitudinal grey streak above the anterior part of the second dorsal blotch, shorter in males. A very oblique dark grey dash is found above the end of the cell, with a slight mark preceding it. There is a nearly straight dark grey line from beneath the costa at three-fifths to the posterior angle of the third dorsal blotch. In males there are three and in females six dark grey pre-marginal dots around the apex and termen, the largest about the apex. The hindwings are light grey.
