= Antaeotricha arystis =

Scientific classification
- Kingdom: Animalia
- Phylum: Arthropoda
- Clade: Pancrustacea
- Class: Insecta
- Order: Lepidoptera
- Family: Depressariidae
- Genus: Antaeotricha
- Species: A. arystis

Binomial name
- Antaeotricha arystis Meyrick, 1915

Species of moth in genus Antaeotricha

Antaeotricha arystis is a moth in the family Depressariidae. It was described by Edward Meyrick in 1915. It is found in Guyana.

The wingspan is 17–18 mm. The forewings are white with a short oblique dark fuscous mark on the base of the costa and a suffused dark fuscous elongate blotch extending along the basal fourth of the dorsum, as well as an irregular sinuate-dentate dark fuscous line from one-fifth of the costa to the anterior edge of a quadrate fuscous blotch on the middle of the dorsum not reaching half across the wing. There is an irregular slightly curved dark fuscous line from the middle of the costa to four-fifths of the dorsum, and another from three-fourths of the costa to the tornus, these connected on the dorsum by a quadrate dark fuscous blotch. Seven large blackish marginal dots are found around the posterior part of the costa and termen. The hindwings are whitish-grey with a long ochreous-whitish subcostal hairpencil lying beneath the forewings.
