= Antaeotricha serangodes =

Scientific classification
- Domain: Eukaryota
- Kingdom: Animalia
- Phylum: Arthropoda
- Class: Insecta
- Order: Lepidoptera
- Family: Depressariidae
- Genus: Antaeotricha
- Species: A. serangodes

Binomial name
- Antaeotricha serangodes Meyrick, 1915

Species of moth

Antaeotricha serangodes is a moth in the family Depressariidae. It was described by Edward Meyrick in 1915. It is found in Panama.

The wingspan is about 26 mm. The forewings are white with two or three light grey dots near the base and a curved light grey line from one-fifth of the costa to one-third of the dorsum. The first discal stigma is blackish, resting on the apex of a subtriangular light grey blotch on the middle of the dorsum. There is a transverse blackish mark on the end of the cell and an oblique grey line from costa before the middle, irregularly curved around behind this to a small dark grey spot on the dorsum at three-fourths. There are also two curved parallel transverse grey streaks between this and the termen, the first not reaching the costa. Three or four very small black marginal dots are found around the apex. The hindwings are whitish-grey, with the costal margin expanded to beyond the middle with very long rough projecting hairscales suffused with dark grey beneath, and a moderately long whitish subcostal hairpencil lying beneath the forewings.
