= Antaeotricha homologa =

Scientific classification
- Domain: Eukaryota
- Kingdom: Animalia
- Phylum: Arthropoda
- Class: Insecta
- Order: Lepidoptera
- Family: Depressariidae
- Genus: Antaeotricha
- Species: A. homologa

Binomial name
- Antaeotricha homologa (Meyrick, 1915)

Synonyms
- Aphanoxena homologa Meyrick, 1915

Species of moth

Antaeotricha homologa is a moth of the family Depressariidae. It is found in Guyana.

The wingspan is about 19 mm. The forewings are shining white, the dorsal area beneath the fold tinged with grey and with an oblique triangular suffused grey spot on the dorsum at one-fourth, and a transverse spot beyond the middle, both reaching one-third across the wing. There is a cloudy grey spot in the disc at one-third and two dark fuscous dots on the end of the cell, the lower slightly anterior, and a fuscous linear dot before and above the upper. A dark fuscous blotch extends on the dorsum from before three-fourths to the tornus, the upper edge with two irregular projections not reaching half across the wing. There is also a curved or bent fuscous line running from three-fifths of the costa to the posterior projection of this blotch. Seven cloudy dark fuscous marginal dots are found around the apex and termen. The hindwings are light grey.
