= Antaeotricha ocellifer =

Scientific classification
- Kingdom: Animalia
- Phylum: Arthropoda
- Class: Insecta
- Order: Lepidoptera
- Family: Depressariidae
- Genus: Antaeotricha
- Species: A. ocellifer

Binomial name
- Antaeotricha ocellifer (Walsingham, 1912)

Synonyms
- Stenoma ocellifer Walsingham, 1912

Species of moth

Antaeotricha ocellifer is a moth in the family Depressariidae. It was described by Lord Walsingham in 1912. It is found in Mexico (Durango), Costa Rica and Guatemala.

The wingspan is 20-21. The forewings are white, with a dark olive-brown spot in the fold at about one-fourth. A strong bronzy olive ocelloid dorsal spot with white centre at one-third and a sagittate dorsal spot of the same colour at two-thirds, there is also a faint indication of an olivaceous spot a little beyond the end of the cell, preceded by another near its upper angle, and two or three within the margin near the apex of the wing, these are all very faint. The hindwings are broad, with the costa much arched with a long fringe of upstanding scales on the basal half, appearing fawn-brownish beneath. The costa and flexus are broadly whitish, a short upwardly curved fringe of brownish ochreous scales on the cell at about one-third from the base.
