= Antaeotricha smileuta =

Scientific classification
- Domain: Eukaryota
- Kingdom: Animalia
- Phylum: Arthropoda
- Class: Insecta
- Order: Lepidoptera
- Family: Depressariidae
- Genus: Antaeotricha
- Species: A. smileuta

Binomial name
- Antaeotricha smileuta Meyrick, 1915

Species of moth

Antaeotricha smileuta is a moth in the family Depressariidae. It was described by Edward Meyrick in 1915. It is found in Guyana and French Guiana.

The wingspan is 21–22 mm. The forewings are white with an elongate-oval greyish blotch resting on the dorsum about one-third, and a round grey blotch resting on the dorsum at two-thirds. There are three irregular somewhat interrupted transverse grey lines, the first at one-third, angulated and interrupted on the fold, connected with second by a streak in the disc, the second from the middle of the costa to five-sixths of the dorsum, the third from two-thirds of the costa to the tornus. There is a grey spot before the apex, sometimes nearly obsolete. The hindwings are whitish, posteriorly tinged with pale greyish and with the costal margin rather expanded to beyond the middle, with long rough projecting hairscales partially suffused with grey beneath, and a long whitish-yellowish subcostal hairpencil lying beneath the forewings.
