= Antaeotricha mustela =

Scientific classification
- Domain: Eukaryota
- Kingdom: Animalia
- Phylum: Arthropoda
- Class: Insecta
- Order: Lepidoptera
- Family: Depressariidae
- Genus: Antaeotricha
- Species: A. mustela

Binomial name
- Antaeotricha mustela (Walsingham, 1912)

Synonyms
- Stenoma mustela Walsingham, 1912

Species of moth

Antaeotricha mustela is a moth in the family Depressariidae. It was described by Lord Walsingham in 1912. It is found in Panama.

The wingspan is 19-21 mm. The forewings are whitish grey, suffused and sprinkled with brownish mouse-colour, and with three, oblique, transverse, darker brownish fuscous streaks—the first, from the costa at about one-sixth, slightly dilated on the fold and on the dorsum before the middle; the second, from before the middle of the costa, slightly wavy, passing the outer end of the cell, where it forms a short outward streak, descending to the dorsum with some outward suffusion at one-third from the termen. The third streak approaches the middle of the termen in its long outwardly oblique curve and reverts to the tornus, a series of somewhat connected spots of the same colour following the margin beyond it. The costa is very narrowly clean whitish grey. The hindwings are brownish grey.
