= Antaeotricha cirrhoxantha =

Scientific classification
- Domain: Eukaryota
- Kingdom: Animalia
- Phylum: Arthropoda
- Class: Insecta
- Order: Lepidoptera
- Family: Depressariidae
- Genus: Antaeotricha
- Species: A. cirrhoxantha

Binomial name
- Antaeotricha cirrhoxantha (Meyrick, 1915)

Synonyms
- Stenoma cirrhoxantha Meyrick, 1915

Species of moth

Antaeotricha cirrhoxantha is a moth of the family Depressariidae. It was described by Edward Meyrick in 1915. It is endemic to French Guiana.

The wingspan is 20–22 millimetres (0.79–0.87 in). The forewings are orange ochreous with the costal edge orange yellow and a round yellow blotch resting on the dorsum about one-fourth, and reaching more than half across the wing. There is a large bright yellow posterior area occupying the apical portion of the wing except a narrow suffused streak of ground colour around the apex and termen, its anterior edge running from one-fourth of the costa to three-fourths of the dorsum, rather irregular, with a triangular prominence of ground colour below the middle in which is a white dot partially edged with dark fuscous. The hindwings are pale yellowish, the dorsal half suffused with very pale grey.
