= Antaeotricha gravescens =

Scientific classification
- Kingdom: Animalia
- Phylum: Arthropoda
- Class: Insecta
- Order: Lepidoptera
- Family: Depressariidae
- Genus: Antaeotricha
- Species: A. gravescens

Binomial name
- Antaeotricha gravescens Meyrick, 1926

Species of moth

Antaeotricha gravescens is a moth of the family Depressariidae. It is found in Colombia.

== Description ==
The wingspan is about 20 mm. The forewings are white, faintly yellowish-tinged in the disc and with the basal fourth of the wing and dorsal area beneath the fold light violet-grey, crossed by two irregular suffused dark grey fasciate streaks on the basal area and two beyond this, some ferruginous suffusion towards the dorsal scale-projection. There are two dark grey dots transversely placed on the end of the cell and there is an irregular suffused dark grey fasciate streak from the costa beyond the middle behind these to the dorsum before the tornus, the area beyond this grey except towards the costa, cut by a suffused white line from the costa at four-fifths to the termen above the tornus. The hindwings are dark grey with the costa expanded to beyond the middle, with a projecting fringe of long grey hairscales white at the tips and a whitish subcostal hairpencil from the base to beyond the middle.
