= Antaeotricha congelata =

Scientific classification
- Domain: Eukaryota
- Kingdom: Animalia
- Phylum: Arthropoda
- Class: Insecta
- Order: Lepidoptera
- Family: Depressariidae
- Genus: Antaeotricha
- Species: A. congelata

Binomial name
- Antaeotricha congelata Meyrick, 1926

Species of moth

Antaeotricha congelata is a moth of the family Depressariidae. It is found in Peru.

The wingspan is about 24 mm. The forewings are white with the dorsal third irregularly fuscous, attenuated towards the tornus. There is a fuscous mark above this at the base. The stigma is fuscous, the first discal elongate, the plical also elongate, near and obliquely beyond this. There are also fuscous marks beneath the costal edge about one-fourth and beyond the middle, from the second an oblique series of three cloudy dots. From beneath the costa at four-fifths, a slightly curved series of cloudy fuscous dots runs to the tornus, indented and enlarged above the middle. There is a marginal series of black dots around the apex and termen. The hindwings are light grey, with the apex white and the costa expanded on the basal half, with a fringe of long projecting grey hairscales becoming white at the tips, a whitish-ochreous subcostal hairpencil from the base to beyond the middle.
