= Antaeotricha diacta =

Scientific classification
- Domain: Eukaryota
- Kingdom: Animalia
- Phylum: Arthropoda
- Class: Insecta
- Order: Lepidoptera
- Family: Depressariidae
- Genus: Antaeotricha
- Species: A. diacta

Binomial name
- Antaeotricha diacta (Meyrick, 1916)

Synonyms
- Stenoma diacta Meyrick, 1916

Species of moth

Antaeotricha diacta is a moth of the family Depressariidae. It is found in French Guiana.

The wingspan is about 17 mm. The forewings are white, faintly fuscous-tinged on the dorsal area and with dark fuscous markings. There is a streak from the extreme base of the costa to one-fifth of the dorsum. The first discal and plical stigmata are moderate, the plical posterior, connected with the dorsum before the middle by some fuscous suffusion. There is a cloudy line from the costa before the middle to three-fourths of the dorsum, widely interrupted beneath the costa, marked with a stronger dot in the disc, expanded into a suffused spot towards the dorsum. A curved line is found from three-fourths of the costa to the tornus, somewhat sinuate inwards toward the costa and there are eight marginal dots around the apex and termen. The hindwings are whitish.
