= Antaeotricha lysimeris =

Scientific classification
- Domain: Eukaryota
- Kingdom: Animalia
- Phylum: Arthropoda
- Class: Insecta
- Order: Lepidoptera
- Family: Depressariidae
- Genus: Antaeotricha
- Species: A. lysimeris

Binomial name
- Antaeotricha lysimeris Meyrick, 1915

Species of moth

Antaeotricha lysimeris is a moth of the family Depressariidae. It is found in Peru.

The wingspan is about 26 mm. The forewings are ochreous-whitish, whiter towards the costa and termen and with a spot composed of two short blackish-grey streaks from the costa at one-fifth, and another on the dorsum at one-fourth, with some scattered brown and blackish scales and small marks between them. There is a transverse blackish mark on the end of the cell and two faint fuscous-tinged curved shades beyond this, and another along the termen. A small suffused fuscous spot is found on the costa at three-fourths, and two or three dots above the apex. The hindwings are ochreous-whitish, tinged with pale yellowish-grey posteriorly. The costal margin is expanded on the basal half, with very long rough projecting hairscales suffused with greyish beneath, and a long subcostal pencil of whitish hairs lying beneath the forewings.
