= Antaeotricha microtypa =

Scientific classification
- Domain: Eukaryota
- Kingdom: Animalia
- Phylum: Arthropoda
- Class: Insecta
- Order: Lepidoptera
- Family: Depressariidae
- Genus: Antaeotricha
- Species: A. microtypa

Binomial name
- Antaeotricha microtypa (Meyrick, 1915)

Synonyms
- Stenoma microtypa Meyrick, 1915

Species of moth

Antaeotricha microtypa is a moth of the family Depressariidae. It is found in Guyana.

The wingspan is 14–15 mm. The forewings are white, the dorsal three-fifths dark fuscous and with a dark fuscous streak from the base of the costa to join an elongate thick dark fuscous mark resting on the upper edge of the dark area before the middle. There is an indistinct undefined streak of light fuscous suffusion from beneath the costa at three-fourths to the dorsal area beyond the middle and two oblique dark fuscous streaks from the costa at the middle and three-fourths to the dorsal area, the second running to the middle of the termen and limiting it posteriorly. Some fuscous suffusion is found towards the apex and there is a small sharply defined blackish rectangular spot on the apical margin, two black dots above and two below it. The hindwings are grey.
