= Antaeotricha tephrodesma =

Scientific classification
- Domain: Eukaryota
- Kingdom: Animalia
- Phylum: Arthropoda
- Class: Insecta
- Order: Lepidoptera
- Family: Depressariidae
- Genus: Antaeotricha
- Species: A. tephrodesma

Binomial name
- Antaeotricha tephrodesma (Meyrick, 1916)

Synonyms
- Stenoma tephrodesma Meyrick, 1916

Species of moth

Antaeotricha tephrodesma is a moth of the family Depressariidae. It is found in Brazil and the Guianas.

The wingspan is 14–15 mm. The forewings are whitish, partially faintly tinged with fuscous and with a suffused dark fuscous streak from the base of the costa along the basal one-fourth or one-third of the dorsum, followed by some undefined lighter ashy-fuscous suffusion. The first discal stigma is rather large and blackish, the plical smaller, obliquely beyond it. There are two somewhat irregular rather curved suffused dark fuscous lines from the costa at the middle and three-fourths to the dorsum at two-thirds and the tornus, the included space wholly ashy-fuscous except the costal edge. There are seven blackish marginal dots around the apex and termen. The hindwings are grey.
