= Antaeotricha obtusa =

Scientific classification
- Domain: Eukaryota
- Kingdom: Animalia
- Phylum: Arthropoda
- Class: Insecta
- Order: Lepidoptera
- Family: Depressariidae
- Genus: Antaeotricha
- Species: A. obtusa

Binomial name
- Antaeotricha obtusa (Meyrick, 1916)

Synonyms
- Stenoma obtusa Meyrick, 1916

Species of moth

Antaeotricha obtusa is a moth of the family Depressariidae. It is found in French Guiana.

The wingspan is about 19 mm. The forewings are white tinged with violet fuscous and dark fuscous markings. There is a suffused streak from the base just beneath the costa to one-fifth of the dorsum and an irregular line from towards costa at one-fifth to the middle of the dorsum. There is a somewhat irregular line from beyond the middle of the costa to three-fourths of the dorsum and a rather curved line from four-fifths of the costa to the tornus, the space between this and the preceding greyer on the dorsal half. Six marginal dots are found around the apex and termen. The hindwings are light grey, suffused with whitish towards the base and with the costa slightly expanded and fringed with rough projecting whitish hairscales from the base to two-thirds.
