= Antaeotricha falsidica =

Scientific classification
- Domain: Eukaryota
- Kingdom: Animalia
- Phylum: Arthropoda
- Class: Insecta
- Order: Lepidoptera
- Family: Depressariidae
- Genus: Antaeotricha
- Species: A. falsidica

Binomial name
- Antaeotricha falsidica (Meyrick, 1915)

Synonyms
- Stenoma falsidica Meyrick, 1915

Species of moth

Antaeotricha falsidica is a moth of the family Depressariidae. It is found in Suriname.

== Description ==
The wingspan is about 19 mm. The forewings are pale greyish-ochreous with suffused, fuscous markings. There is an elongate mark towards the base in the middle, and a streak along the basal fourth of the dorsum, as well as a spot in the disc at one-third. An irregular transverse blotch is found from the middle of the dorsum, not reaching half across the wing and there is a cloudy shade passing round the outside of the cell from vein 11 to 2, and then to three-fourths of the dorsum. There is some indistinct pre-marginal suffusion on the termen, obscurely interrupted on the veins. The hindwings light grey with the costal margin abruptly expanded from the base to near the middle, with long rough projecting hairscales.
