= Antaeotricha tempestiva =

Scientific classification
- Domain: Eukaryota
- Kingdom: Animalia
- Phylum: Arthropoda
- Class: Insecta
- Order: Lepidoptera
- Family: Depressariidae
- Genus: Antaeotricha
- Species: A. tempestiva

Binomial name
- Antaeotricha tempestiva (Meyrick, 1916)

Synonyms
- Stenoma tempestiva Meyrick, 1916

Species of moth

Antaeotricha tempestiva is a species of moth of the family Depressariidae. It is found in French Guiana.

The wingspan is about 22 mm. The forewings are yellow-ochreous suffused with light brownish, becoming browner towards the base. The costal edge is whitish-ochreous, edged beneath with fuscous. The stigmata are dark fuscous, the plical obliquely beyond the first discal and there are two indistinct lilac-brownish lines sprinkled with dark fuscous, the first rather irregular, from the middle of the costa behind the cell to three-fourths of the dorsum, the second from a cloudy spot on the costa at four-fifths to the dorsum before the tornus, curved. There is also a marginal series of blackish dots around the apex and termen. The hindwings are whitish-ochreous.
