= Antaeotricha lebetias =

Scientific classification
- Domain: Eukaryota
- Kingdom: Animalia
- Phylum: Arthropoda
- Class: Insecta
- Order: Lepidoptera
- Family: Depressariidae
- Genus: Antaeotricha
- Species: A. lebetias

Binomial name
- Antaeotricha lebetias (Meyrick, 1915)

Synonyms
- Stenoma lebetias Meyrick, 1915

Species of moth

Antaeotricha lebetias is a moth of the family Depressariidae. It is found in Brazil, French Guiana and Guyana.

The wingspan is about 23 mm. The forewings are white with the markings dark fuscous. There is an elongate spot beneath the costa at the base and a line on each side of the fold from near the base to one-third and a suffused irregular streak from near the basal two-thirds of the dorsum, and some slight suffusion beyond this. There are three very oblique series of suffused spots or marks, the first of three spots, the median largest, the second and third each of three partially connected marks and both directed to a large rounded tornal blotch. A premarginal streak runs around the termen and the apical sixth of the costa, attenuated below and broadly dilated above. The hindwings are rather dark grey, lighter anteriorly.
