= Antaeotricha exusta =

Scientific classification
- Domain: Eukaryota
- Kingdom: Animalia
- Phylum: Arthropoda
- Class: Insecta
- Order: Lepidoptera
- Family: Depressariidae
- Genus: Antaeotricha
- Species: A. exusta

Binomial name
- Antaeotricha exusta Meyrick, 1916

Species of moth

Antaeotricha exusta is a moth of the family Depressariidae. It is found in French Guiana and Brazil.

The wingspan is about 27 mm. The forewings are dark grey sprinkled with blackish and with an undefined patch of dark fuscous suffusion extending over the anterior half of the dorsum, with the projecting scales of the dorsal edge brown. There is a suffused blackish dot on the end of the cell and an undefined fascia of dark fuscous suffusion from the middle of the costa to the tornus, narrower towards the costa, obtusely angulated in the middle. A suffused dark fuscous streak is found along the posterior third of the costa. The hindwings are dark grey with the costa rather expanded from the base to two-thirds, with long dense roughly projecting dark grey scales, and a long whitish subcostal hairpencil from the base lying in a yellow groove concealed by the forewings.
