= Antaeotricha hapsicora =

Scientific classification
- Domain: Eukaryota
- Kingdom: Animalia
- Phylum: Arthropoda
- Class: Insecta
- Order: Lepidoptera
- Family: Depressariidae
- Genus: Antaeotricha
- Species: A. hapsicora

Binomial name
- Antaeotricha hapsicora Meyrick, 1915

Species of moth

Antaeotricha hapsicora is a moth in the family Depressariidae. It was described by Edward Meyrick in 1915. It is found in Brazil (São Paulo).

The wingspan is 26–28 mm. The forewings are white, tinged with ochreous except on the margins and with a light grey basal patch not reaching the costa, towards the dorsum with a spot of dark grey mixture, and on the dorsal half extended by light grey suffusion to a dark grey dorsal patch at two-thirds. The first discal stigma is light grey and there are two blackish-grey dots transversely placed on the end of the cell. There is an oblique light grey transverse shade from near the costa in the middle, curved outwards around these dots and there are two light narrow transverse slightly curved or nearly straight fasciae between this and the termen, not reaching the costa. The hindwings are grey, lighter anteriorly.
