= Antaeotricha erotica =

Scientific classification
- Domain: Eukaryota
- Kingdom: Animalia
- Phylum: Arthropoda
- Class: Insecta
- Order: Lepidoptera
- Family: Depressariidae
- Genus: Antaeotricha
- Species: A. erotica

Binomial name
- Antaeotricha erotica (Meyrick, 1916)

Synonyms
- Stenoma erotica Meyrick, 1916

Species of moth

Antaeotricha erotica is a moth of the family Depressariidae. It is found in French Guiana.

The wingspan is about 18 mm. The forewings are light greyish-ochreous, the costal third light rose-pink with a white subcostal spot at the base. There is a violet fuscous patch occupying the anterior half of the wing except the costal third, its dorsal edge white towards the base, the posterior edge irregular. The stigmata are black, the plical obliquely beyond the first discal, the second discal small and indistinct. A blackish spot is found on the costa at three-fifths, where a curved dentate dark grey line runs to the dorsum before the tornus. There is also a marginal series of black dots around the posterior part of the costa and termen. The hindwings are pale whitish-ochreous, the apical half pale rosy-pink.
