= Antaeotricha brachysaris =

Scientific classification
- Kingdom: Animalia
- Phylum: Arthropoda
- Clade: Pancrustacea
- Class: Insecta
- Order: Lepidoptera
- Family: Depressariidae
- Genus: Antaeotricha
- Species: A. brachysaris

Binomial name
- Antaeotricha brachysaris Meyrick, 1916

Species of moth in genus Antaeotricha

Antaeotricha brachysaris is a moth of the family Depressariidae. It is found in French Guiana.

The wingspan is about 18 mm. The forewings are white, the dorsal third suffused with pale fuscous and with a fuscous dot near the base below the middle, as well as cloudy dark fuscous lines from the costa at one-fifth and the middle running to subtriangular dark fuscous spots on the dorsum at the middle and four-fifths. There is a fine dark fuscous line from three-fourths of the costa to the tornus, sharply indented towards the costa, rather curved below this. Six dark fuscous marginal dots are found around the termen. The hindwings are rather dark grey, the base whitish-tinged and with a short whitish supramedian hairpencil from the base lying beneath the forewings, only reaching one-third of the wing.
