= Antaeotricha habilis =

Scientific classification
- Domain: Eukaryota
- Kingdom: Animalia
- Phylum: Arthropoda
- Class: Insecta
- Order: Lepidoptera
- Family: Depressariidae
- Genus: Antaeotricha
- Species: A. habilis

Binomial name
- Antaeotricha habilis (Meyrick, 1915)

Synonyms
- Stenoma habilis Meyrick, 1915

Species of moth

Antaeotricha habilis is a moth of the family Depressariidae. It is found in Guyana.

The wingspan is 17–20 mm. The forewings are pale greyish-ochreous with a blackish dash near the base above the middle and a spot of dark grey suffusion on the dorsum at one-third, as well as a series of three or four irregular dark grey marks from near the costa before the middle to near the dark fuscous second discal stigma. There is an irregular-edged suffused transverse dark fuscous patch from the dorsum beneath the second discal stigma, nearly reaching it and a cloudy curved interrupted grey subterminal shade from opposite the apex to the tornus. A series of small dark fuscous marginal dots is found around the apex and termen, sometimes little marked. The hindwings are pale greyish.
