= Antaeotricha fractinubes =

Scientific classification
- Domain: Eukaryota
- Kingdom: Animalia
- Phylum: Arthropoda
- Class: Insecta
- Order: Lepidoptera
- Family: Depressariidae
- Genus: Antaeotricha
- Species: A. fractinubes

Binomial name
- Antaeotricha fractinubes (Walsingham, 1912)

Synonyms
- Stenoma fractinubes Walsingham, 1912

Species of moth

Antaeotricha fractinubes is a moth in the family Depressariidae. It was described by Lord Walsingham in 1912. It is found in Panama.

The wingspan is about 21 mm. The forewings are white, with an irregular greyish-brown cloud commencing on the dorsum near the base, thence diffused outward and upward to the costa beyond the middle, where it is connected with an apical and terminal shade of the same colour and with a shorter parallel shade preceding it. This cloudy suffusion is much broken up by longitudinal lines and streaks of the white ground colour, a central one interrupted by a spot at the end of the cell being especially noticeable; the terminal shade lines are also somewhat jagged and interrupted. The hindwings are pale brownish-grey.
