= Antaeotricha glaucescens =

Scientific classification
- Domain: Eukaryota
- Kingdom: Animalia
- Phylum: Arthropoda
- Class: Insecta
- Order: Lepidoptera
- Family: Depressariidae
- Genus: Antaeotricha
- Species: A. glaucescens

Binomial name
- Antaeotricha glaucescens (Meyrick, 1916)

Synonyms
- Stenoma glaucescens Meyrick, 1916

Species of moth

Antaeotricha glaucescens is a moth of the family Depressariidae. It is found in French Guiana.

The wingspan is 16–19 mm for males and about 23 mm for females. The forewings are greenish-grey, obscurely streaked with grey-whitish suffusion along the veins and with the costal and terminal edge whitish. The stigmata are dark fuscous, the first discal represented by an elongate mark edged with whitish, the second moderate, the plical minute. The hindwings are grey with the costa in both sexes expanded from the base to three-fourths, with a strong projection of rough hairscales beyond the middle suffused with dark grey beneath, in males with a hyaline area in the anterior part of the cell, of which the upper margin appears glandular.
