= Antaeotricha platydesma =

Scientific classification
- Domain: Eukaryota
- Kingdom: Animalia
- Phylum: Arthropoda
- Class: Insecta
- Order: Lepidoptera
- Family: Depressariidae
- Genus: Antaeotricha
- Species: A. platydesma

Binomial name
- Antaeotricha platydesma Meyrick, 1915

Species of moth

Antaeotricha platydesma is a moth in the family Depressariidae. It was described by Edward Meyrick in 1915. It is found in Guyana.

The wingspan is 20–23 mm. The forewings are greyish-ochreous with the costal edge whitish-ochreous throughout, edged below by a fine dark grey line. The markings are dark ashy-grey. There is an irregular spot on the base of the dorsum and a cloudy irregular line from one-fourth of the costa to the middle of the dorsum and a broad oblique subterminal fascia, extending on the costa from the middle to five-sixths and running to the tornus. Some cloudy dots are found around the apical margin. The hindwings are rather dark grey, with the costa in males hardly expanded, and with a moderately long whitish subcostal hairpencil lying beneath the forewings.
