= Antaeotricha basilaris =

Scientific classification
- Kingdom: Animalia
- Phylum: Arthropoda
- Clade: Pancrustacea
- Class: Insecta
- Order: Lepidoptera
- Family: Depressariidae
- Genus: Antaeotricha
- Species: A. basilaris

Binomial name
- Antaeotricha basilaris (Busck, 1914)

Synonyms
- Stenoma basilaris Busck, 1914

Species of moth in genus Antaeotricha

Antaeotricha basilaris is a moth in the family Depressariidae. It was described by August Busck in 1914. It is found in Panama.

The wingspan is 16–18 mm. The forewings are white, overlaid with dark and light grey on the dorsal half, the costal half mostly white and the base of the costal edge and a short streak at the costal fourth black. There is a small black streak on the costa at the apical third and a prominent, oval black spot at the end of the cell, followed by a very irregular and inconspicuous blackish zigzag line across the wing. At the apical fourth is a narrow white transverse fascia and around the apical and terminal edges a marginal series of blackish brown dots. The hindwings are light fuscous.
