= Antaeotricha campylodes =

Scientific classification
- Kingdom: Animalia
- Phylum: Arthropoda
- Clade: Pancrustacea
- Class: Insecta
- Order: Lepidoptera
- Family: Depressariidae
- Genus: Antaeotricha
- Species: A. campylodes

Binomial name
- Antaeotricha campylodes Meyrick, 1916

Species of moth in genus Antaeotricha

Antaeotricha campylodes is a moth of the family Depressariidae. It is found in French Guiana.

The wingspan is about 18 mm. The forewings are shining white with a fuscous dot on the base of the costa and a strongly curved band of irregular fuscous mottling, proceeding from a blotch of dark fuscous markings on the dorsum at one-fourth, through the disc above the middle, and returning to the dorsum at three-fourths. There is an oblique fuscous shade terminating in the tornus not reaching the costa, and another along the upper part of the termen. The hindwings are white with the costa expanded from the base to three-fourths, with a broad projection of long rough scales suffused with grey beneath, and a long white subcostal hairpencil from the base lying beneath the forewings.
