= Antaeotricha imminens =

Scientific classification
- Domain: Eukaryota
- Kingdom: Animalia
- Phylum: Arthropoda
- Class: Insecta
- Order: Lepidoptera
- Family: Depressariidae
- Genus: Antaeotricha
- Species: A. imminens

Binomial name
- Antaeotricha imminens (Meyrick, 1915)

Synonyms
- Stenoma imminens Meyrick, 1915

Species of moth

Antaeotricha imminens is a moth of the family Depressariidae. It was described by Edward Meyrick in 1915. It is endemic to Suriname.

The wingspan is about 28 millimetres (1.1 in). The forewings are ochreous brown, becoming light brownish ochreous towards the costa on the anterior half. There is a broad undefined transverse band of dark brown suffusion, darkest towards the dorsum, extending on the dorsum from the base to two-thirds and on the costa from the middle to five-sixths, where an undefined somewhat curved shade of fuscous suffusion runs to the tornus. A roundish spot of fuscous suffusion is found towards the base of veins 2–5. The hindwings are rather dark grey.
