= Antaeotricha helicias =

Scientific classification
- Domain: Eukaryota
- Kingdom: Animalia
- Phylum: Arthropoda
- Class: Insecta
- Order: Lepidoptera
- Family: Depressariidae
- Genus: Antaeotricha
- Species: A. helicias

Binomial name
- Antaeotricha helicias Meyrick, 1916

Species of moth

Antaeotricha helicias is a moth of the family Depressariidae. It is found in French Guiana.

The wingspan is about 25 mm. The forewings are grey-whitish, with a faint lilac tinge and a fuscous basal dot below the middle. There are three irregular oblique cloudy light fuscous lines, the first from one-fourth of the costa to the middle of the dorsum, the second from the middle of the costa to four-fifths of the dorsum, the third from three-fourths of the costa to just before the tornus, rather strongly curved outwards on the lower half. There are eight dark fuscous marginal dots around the apex and termen. The hindwings are grey-whitish with the costa slightly expanded from the base to two-thirds, with a long whitish subcostal hairpencil from the base lying beneath the forewings.
