= Antaeotricha ioptila =

Scientific classification
- Domain: Eukaryota
- Kingdom: Animalia
- Phylum: Arthropoda
- Class: Insecta
- Order: Lepidoptera
- Family: Depressariidae
- Genus: Antaeotricha
- Species: A. ioptila

Binomial name
- Antaeotricha ioptila (Meyrick, 1915)

Synonyms
- Stenoma ioptila Meyrick, 1915

Species of moth

Antaeotricha ioptila is a moth of the family Depressariidae. It is found in Guyana.

The wingspan is 23–24 mm. The forewings are fuscous, the posterior third of the wing suffused with pale ochreous and with a broad suffused white streak running from two-fifths of the costa to the apex, leaving the costa narrowly ochreous posteriorly. There is a yellow-ochreous median streak from the base to the middle, towards the base suffusedly widened nearly to the costa. Immediately beneath this is a whitish streak along the fold, basally widened to the dorsum, thus appearing to enclose a semi-oval dorsal blotch of ground colour. The hindwings are rather dark grey.
