= Antaeotricha mitratella =

Scientific classification
- Domain: Eukaryota
- Kingdom: Animalia
- Phylum: Arthropoda
- Class: Insecta
- Order: Lepidoptera
- Family: Depressariidae
- Genus: Antaeotricha
- Species: A. mitratella

Binomial name
- Antaeotricha mitratella (Busck, 1914)

Synonyms
- Stenoma mitratella Busck, 1914

Species of moth

Antaeotricha mitratella is a moth in the family Depressariidae. It was described by August Busck in 1914. It is found in Panama.

The wingspan is about 23 mm. The forewings are white, heavily overlaid with light ochreous fuscous except on the costal part, which is pure white, and an ill-defined streak from the base along the lower edge of the cell, where the white scales predominate. At the end of the cell is a short, transverse, blackish-brown streak and from the apical third of the costa runs an outwardly curved, dark fuscous, ill-defined line across the wing. At the basal third of the dorsal edge is a conspicuous tuft of light ochreous brown, raised scales. The hindwings are light fuscous.
