= Antaeotricha mundella =

Scientific classification
- Kingdom: Animalia
- Phylum: Arthropoda
- Class: Insecta
- Order: Lepidoptera
- Family: Depressariidae
- Genus: Antaeotricha
- Species: A. mundella

Binomial name
- Antaeotricha mundella (Walker, 1864)

Synonyms
- Cryptolechia mundella Walker, 1864; Paepia contortella Walker, 1864

Species of moth

Antaeotricha mundella is a moth in the family Depressariidae. It was described by Francis Walker in 1864. It is found in Amazonas, Brazil.

Adults are brownish-fawn coloured, the forewings with a blackish streak which extends from the middle of the base to nearly one-third of the length, and is there bent to the interior border. Another blackish streak proceeds from near the flexure of the first one to beyond the middle of the wing, where it is bent abruptly to the interior border. There is a slight transverse blackish submarginal line, which approaches very near the exterior border hindward, but retreats from it in front. The marginal points are black. The hindwings are aeneous (bronze) brown.
