= Antaeotricha thysanodes =

Scientific classification
- Domain: Eukaryota
- Kingdom: Animalia
- Phylum: Arthropoda
- Class: Insecta
- Order: Lepidoptera
- Family: Depressariidae
- Genus: Antaeotricha
- Species: A. thysanodes

Binomial name
- Antaeotricha thysanodes (Meyrick, 1915)

Synonyms
- Stenoma thysanodes Meyrick, 1915; Stenoma cynopis Meyrick, 1915

Species of moth

Antaeotricha thysanodes is a moth of the family Depressariidae. It is found in Guyana, French Guiana and Brazil.

The wingspan is 28–31 mm. The forewings are purplish-brown, darker towards the base and along the costa, the posterior two-fifths suffused with light brownish-ochreous except towards the costa. The second discal stigma is small and dark fuscous. The hindwings are dark grey with the costal margin expanded to beyond the middle, on the undersurface with a subcostal fringe of long projecting grey-whitish hairs from above vein 8 towards its apex.
