= Antaeotricha similis =

Scientific classification
- Domain: Eukaryota
- Kingdom: Animalia
- Phylum: Arthropoda
- Class: Insecta
- Order: Lepidoptera
- Family: Depressariidae
- Genus: Antaeotricha
- Species: A. similis

Binomial name
- Antaeotricha similis (Busck, 1911)

Synonyms
- Stenoma similis Busck, 1911

Species of moth

Antaeotricha similis is a moth in the family Depressariidae. It was described by August Busck in 1911. It is found in the Guianas and Brazil.

The wingspan is 17–19 mm. The costal half of the forewings is light, nearly white and the dorsal half is dark fuscous. There are three nearly equidistant transverse oblique streaks, the basal one stopping at a small black dot on the middle of the cell, the second one continued somewhat farther up and including a small black dot at the end of the cell and the third reaching across to the costal edge. The bases of the two first streaks are strongly washed into large blackish dorsal shades, reaching nearly to the following streak. The hindwings are whitish fuscous.
