= Antaeotricha ballista =

Scientific classification
- Kingdom: Animalia
- Phylum: Arthropoda
- Clade: Pancrustacea
- Class: Insecta
- Order: Lepidoptera
- Family: Depressariidae
- Genus: Antaeotricha
- Species: A. ballista

Binomial name
- Antaeotricha ballista (Meyrick, 1916)

Synonyms
- Stenoma ballista Meyrick, 1916

Species of moth in genus Antaeotricha

Antaeotricha ballista is a moth of the family Depressariidae. It is found in French Guiana.

The average wingspan is 19–20 mm for males and about 24 mm for females. The forewings are whitish, on the dorsal half faintly brownish tinged. There are two very large dark fuscous blotches, the first extending on the dorsum from near the base to the middle, rounded above, reaching three-fourths across the wing, the second rounded, near the termen, not reaching the costa or the dorsum. There are seven or eight dark fuscous marginal dots around the apex and termen. The hindwings are light grey, darker towards the apex.
