= Antaeotricha sana =

Scientific classification
- Kingdom: Animalia
- Phylum: Arthropoda
- Clade: Pancrustacea
- Class: Insecta
- Order: Lepidoptera
- Family: Depressariidae
- Genus: Antaeotricha
- Species: A. sana

Binomial name
- Antaeotricha sana Meyrick, 1926

Species of moth

Antaeotricha sana is a moth of the family Depressariidae. It is found in Colombia.

The wingspan is about 25 mm. The forewings are white with a rather large fuscous spot on the dorsum towards the base, and oval spots above and beyond its apex. There is a very oblique fuscous streak from the costa at one-fifth passing just beyond these to a semi-oval blotch occupying the median third of the dorsum and containing three transverse markings of whitish suffusion, on the posterior margin of this streak and the blotch is some yellowish suffusion in three places in the disc. There are also two small cloudy greyish spots obliquely placed in the disc beyond the middle, and a larger spot above the tornus. The hindwings are white.
