= Antaeotricha chalastis =

Scientific classification
- Domain: Eukaryota
- Kingdom: Animalia
- Phylum: Arthropoda
- Class: Insecta
- Order: Lepidoptera
- Family: Depressariidae
- Genus: Antaeotricha
- Species: A. chalastis

Binomial name
- Antaeotricha chalastis (Meyrick, 1915)

Synonyms
- Stenoma chalastis Meyrick, 1915

Species of moth

Antaeotricha chalastis is a moth in the family Depressariidae. It was described by Edward Meyrick in 1915. It is found in Guyana.

The wingspan is about 14 mm. The forewings are dark bronzy-grey with a somewhat irregular slightly curved white line from the middle of the costa to two-thirds of the dorsum, dilated on the costa. The costal edge beyond this is white, connected with a white streak around the apical portion of the costa and termen, widest at the apex and attenuated to the extremities, including three or four dark fuscous marginal dots around the apex. The hindwings are dark grey.
