= Antaeotricha glaphyrodes =

Scientific classification
- Domain: Eukaryota
- Kingdom: Animalia
- Phylum: Arthropoda
- Class: Insecta
- Order: Lepidoptera
- Family: Depressariidae
- Genus: Antaeotricha
- Species: A. glaphyrodes

Binomial name
- Antaeotricha glaphyrodes (Meyrick, 1913)

Synonyms
- Stenoma glaphyrodes Meyrick, 1913

Species of moth

Antaeotricha glaphyrodes is a moth in the family Depressariidae. It was described by Edward Meyrick in 1913. It is found in French Guiana and Peru.

The wingspan is 26–27 mm. The forewings are glossy light greyish-ochreous with the costal edge whitish and with a transverse blotch of blackish suffusion on the dorsum before the middle, reaching to the submedian fold. There is sometimes a faint spot of fuscous suffusion towards the dorsum before the tornus. The hindwings are rather light grey.
