= Antaeotricha pumilis =

Scientific classification
- Domain: Eukaryota
- Kingdom: Animalia
- Phylum: Arthropoda
- Class: Insecta
- Order: Lepidoptera
- Family: Depressariidae
- Genus: Antaeotricha
- Species: A. pumilis

Binomial name
- Antaeotricha pumilis (Busck, 1914)

Synonyms
- Catarata pumilis Busck, 1914

Species of moth

Antaeotricha pumilis is a moth in the family Depressariidae. It was described by August Busck in 1914. It is found in Panama.

The wingspan is about 12 mm. The forewings are dark brown with the costal edge from the basal third pure white. A white, thin, zigzag line runs from the middle of the costal edge obliquely across the wing to the apical third of the dorsum and there is a broad white streak parallel with and just before the apical and terminal edge, an indistinct darker brown spot on the middle of the cell and another similar one on the middle of the fold. The hindwings are dark fuscous.
