= Antaeotricha horizontias =

Scientific classification
- Domain: Eukaryota
- Kingdom: Animalia
- Phylum: Arthropoda
- Class: Insecta
- Order: Lepidoptera
- Family: Depressariidae
- Genus: Antaeotricha
- Species: A. horizontias

Binomial name
- Antaeotricha horizontias (Meyrick, 1925)

Synonyms
- Stenoma horizontias Meyrick, 1925

Species of moth

Antaeotricha horizontias is a moth of the family Depressariidae. It is found in Amazonas, Brazil.

The wingspan is about 13 mm. The forewings are white with the dorsal third fuscous, increasing to half posteriorly, and becoming rather darker. The first discal stigma is oval and fuscous, the second similar but darker and merged in the edge of the dorsal area. There is a small dark fuscous spot on the costa towards the apex, and seven black marginal dots around the apex and termen. The hindwings are pale grey, tinged whitish at the apex.
