= Antaeotricha incisurella =

Scientific classification
- Kingdom: Animalia
- Phylum: Arthropoda
- Class: Insecta
- Order: Lepidoptera
- Family: Depressariidae
- Genus: Antaeotricha
- Species: A. incisurella

Binomial name
- Antaeotricha incisurella (Walker, 1864)

Synonyms
- Cryptolechia incisurella Walker, 1864

Species of moth

Antaeotricha incisurella is a moth in the family Depressariidae. It was described by Francis Walker in 1864. It is found in Amazonas, Brazil.

Adults are silvery white, the forewings with a blackish point on the base of the costa, and with two blackish streaks extending obliquely outward from the costa. The first streak is connected with the inner end of a brown short interrupted stripe, which occupies the interior border. The second is connected with the outer end of the same stripe, which has a blackish point in front of its interrupted part. The marginal points are black and minute. The hindwings are cinereous (ash gray) brown.
