= Antaeotricha indicatella =

Scientific classification
- Kingdom: Animalia
- Phylum: Arthropoda
- Class: Insecta
- Order: Lepidoptera
- Family: Depressariidae
- Genus: Antaeotricha
- Species: A. indicatella

Binomial name
- Antaeotricha indicatella (Walker, 1864)

Synonyms
- Cryptolechia indicatella Walker, 1864

Species of moth

Antaeotricha indicatella is a moth in the family Depressariidae. It was described by Francis Walker in 1864. It is found in Amazonas, Brazil.

Adults are ochraceous white, the forewings with an elongated brown patch, which rests on the basal part of the interior border and occupies more than half the breadth and less than half the length of the wing. There is a large brown spot on the apical part of the interior border, which is diffuse outwardly and is bounded by two oblique black lines, of which the inner one is prolonged towards the patch. The marginal points are black. The hindwings are cinereous (ash gray) brown.
