= Antaeotricha reciprocella =

Scientific classification
- Kingdom: Animalia
- Phylum: Arthropoda
- Class: Insecta
- Order: Lepidoptera
- Family: Depressariidae
- Genus: Antaeotricha
- Species: A. reciprocella

Binomial name
- Antaeotricha reciprocella (Walker, 1864)

Synonyms
- Cryptolechia reciprocella Walker, 1864

Species of moth

Antaeotricha reciprocella is a moth in the family Depressariidae. It was described by Francis Walker in 1864. It is found in Pará, Brazil and in the Guianas.

Adults are shining white, the forewings for nearly one-fourth of the surface from the base blackish, this hue more extended along the interior border than along the costa. There are some indications of two transverse cinereous (ash gray) lines and there is a black point in the exterior disk, nearly contiguous to a cinereous patch which rests on the interior angle. The hindwings are aeneous (bronze) cinereous.
