= Antaeotricha isomeris =

Scientific classification
- Domain: Eukaryota
- Kingdom: Animalia
- Phylum: Arthropoda
- Class: Insecta
- Order: Lepidoptera
- Family: Depressariidae
- Genus: Antaeotricha
- Species: A. isomeris

Binomial name
- Antaeotricha isomeris (Meyrick, 1912)

Synonyms
- Stenoma isomeris Meyrick, 1912

Species of moth

Antaeotricha isomeris is a moth of the family Depressariidae. It is found in Brazil (Minas Gerais).

The wingspan is about 19 mm. The forewings are shining white with the dorsal half brownish irregularly sprinkled with dark fuscous, with a median dorsal spot of dark fuscous suffusion, the discal stigmata forming dark fuscous dots on the upper edge of the dividing line. There are some dark fuscous dots around the apex and termen. The hindwings are pale whitish-ochreous.
