= Antaeotricha impactella =

Scientific classification
- Kingdom: Animalia
- Phylum: Arthropoda
- Clade: Pancrustacea
- Class: Insecta
- Order: Lepidoptera
- Family: Depressariidae
- Genus: Antaeotricha
- Species: A. impactella

Binomial name
- Antaeotricha impactella (Walker, 1864)

Synonyms
- Cryptolechia impactella Walker, 1864

Species of moth

Antaeotricha impactella is a moth in the family Depressariidae. It was described by Francis Walker in 1864. It is found in Amazonas, Brazil.

Adults are cinereous (ash gray), the forewings with a few blackish streaks, which form an irregular line extending from the base to nearly three-fourths of the length. There are three oblique blackish costal streaks, of which the first and the second are much more slender than the third. There are several diffuse indistinct pale brownish longitudinal streaks and the marginal points are black. The hindwings are brownish.
