= Antaeotricha aequabilis =

Scientific classification
- Kingdom: Animalia
- Phylum: Arthropoda
- Clade: Pancrustacea
- Class: Insecta
- Order: Lepidoptera
- Family: Depressariidae
- Genus: Antaeotricha
- Species: A. aequabilis

Binomial name
- Antaeotricha aequabilis (Meyrick, 1916)

Synonyms
- Stenoma aequabilis Meyrick, 1916

Species of moth in genus Antaeotricha

Antaeotricha aequabilis is a moth of the family Depressariidae. It is found in French Guiana.

The wingspan is 23–24 mm. The forewings are white with the dorsal half more or less suffused with light fuscous-grey, and with three ill-defined darker fuscous dorsal blotches not reaching half across the wing, two posterior with oblique cloudy shades extending from them obliquely inwards to above the middle. The hindwings are grey, paler anteriorly.
