= Antaeotricha scapularis =

Scientific classification
- Kingdom: Animalia
- Phylum: Arthropoda
- Class: Insecta
- Order: Lepidoptera
- Family: Depressariidae
- Genus: Antaeotricha
- Species: A. scapularis

Binomial name
- Antaeotricha scapularis (Meyrick, 1918)

Synonyms
- Stenoma scapularis Meyrick, 1918

Species of moth

Antaeotricha scapularis is a moth in the family Depressariidae. It was described by Edward Meyrick in 1918. It is found in French Guiana.

The wingspan is about 32 mm. The forewings are glossy light leaden-grey with the costa towards the base narrowly yellow-ochreous, then the costal edge finely white to near the apex. There is a spot of blackish-grey suffusion above the middle of the dorsum, another above and slightly anterior to this, and a third more obscure beneath the lower angle of the cell. The hindwings are grey.
