= Antaeotricha chalinophanes =

Scientific classification
- Kingdom: Animalia
- Phylum: Arthropoda
- Clade: Pancrustacea
- Class: Insecta
- Order: Lepidoptera
- Family: Depressariidae
- Genus: Antaeotricha
- Species: A. chalinophanes

Binomial name
- Antaeotricha chalinophanes (Meyrick, 1931)

Synonyms
- Stenoma chalinophanes Meyrick, 1931

Species of moth

Antaeotricha chalinophanes is a moth in the family Depressariidae. It was described by Edward Meyrick in 1931. It is found in Bolivia.

== Overview ==
Antaeotricha represents an expansive group of moths within the Stenomatinae subfamily, notable for its substantial presence in the Americas. This genus primarily inhabits North and South America, with a noteworthy concentration of species found in the diverse ecosystems of South America.
