= Antaeotricha actista =

Scientific classification
- Kingdom: Animalia
- Phylum: Arthropoda
- Clade: Pancrustacea
- Class: Insecta
- Order: Lepidoptera
- Family: Depressariidae
- Genus: Antaeotricha
- Species: A. actista

Binomial name
- Antaeotricha actista (Meyrick, 1913)

Synonyms
- Stenoma actista Meyrick, 1913

Species of moth in genus Antaeotricha

Antaeotricha actista is a moth in the family Depressariidae. It was described by Edward Meyrick in 1913. It is found in Venezuela and Guyana.

The wingspan is 33–34 mm. The forewings are light fuscous, somewhat sprinkled with darker. The dorsum is indistinctly suffused with darker fuscous from near the base to near the tornus. The second discal stigma is minute and dark fuscous. The hindwings are fuscous.
