= Antaeotricha demas =

Scientific classification
- Domain: Eukaryota
- Kingdom: Animalia
- Phylum: Arthropoda
- Class: Insecta
- Order: Lepidoptera
- Family: Depressariidae
- Genus: Antaeotricha
- Species: A. demas

Binomial name
- Antaeotricha demas (Busck, 1911)

Synonyms
- Stenoma demas Busck, 1911

Species of moth

Antaeotricha demas is a moth in the family Depressariidae. It was described by August Busck in 1911. It is found in French Guiana.

The wingspan is about 14 mm. The forewings are white, with a large black basal spot on the dorsum and a bold oblique black fascia across the wing beyond the cell. This fascia is evenly concave on the inner side, irregularly bent on the outer side, and broader at the dorsal end than at the costa. The extreme apical edge is black. The hindwings are white.
