= Antaeotricha quiescens =

Scientific classification
- Domain: Eukaryota
- Kingdom: Animalia
- Phylum: Arthropoda
- Class: Insecta
- Order: Lepidoptera
- Family: Depressariidae
- Genus: Antaeotricha
- Species: A. quiescens

Binomial name
- Antaeotricha quiescens (Meyrick, 1916)

Synonyms
- Stenoma quiescens Meyrick, 1916

Species of moth

Antaeotricha quiescens is a moth of the family Depressariidae. It is found in French Guiana.

The wingspan is 23–24 mm. The forewings are white, tinged with grey anteriorly and with the dorsal half rather dark greyish-fuscous throughout, this colour in the median area occupying rather more than half, the wider portion terminated by two cloudy darker dots on the end of the cell. The hindwings are grey, paler or whitish towards base.
