= Antaeotricha venatum =

Scientific classification
- Domain: Eukaryota
- Kingdom: Animalia
- Phylum: Arthropoda
- Class: Insecta
- Order: Lepidoptera
- Family: Depressariidae
- Genus: Antaeotricha
- Species: A. venatum

Binomial name
- Antaeotricha venatum (Busck, 1911)

Synonyms
- Stenoma venatum Busck, 1911

Species of moth

Antaeotricha venatum is a moth in the family Depressariidae. It was described by August Busck in 1911. It is found in the Guianas, Bolivia and Brazil.

The wingspan is about 26 mm. The forewings are light greyish ochreous, whitish above the cell, with all veins sharply marked by black lines and with the terminal edge black. There are two black dots near the base within the dorsal edge. The hindwings are dark fuscous.
