= Antaeotricha vacata =

Scientific classification
- Domain: Eukaryota
- Kingdom: Animalia
- Phylum: Arthropoda
- Class: Insecta
- Order: Lepidoptera
- Family: Depressariidae
- Genus: Antaeotricha
- Species: A. vacata

Binomial name
- Antaeotricha vacata Meyrick, 1925

Species of moth

Antaeotricha vacata is a moth of the family Depressariidae. It is endemic to Grenada and Trinidad in the Caribbean.

The wingspan is 20–22 mm. The forewings are light greyish-ochreous with the costal edge whitish-ochreous. The hindwings are light grey with the costa dilated on the anterior half and with a broad median projection of long ochreous-whitish hair-scales partially suffused light grey.
