= Antaeotricha arachnia =

Scientific classification
- Kingdom: Animalia
- Phylum: Arthropoda
- Clade: Pancrustacea
- Class: Insecta
- Order: Lepidoptera
- Family: Depressariidae
- Genus: Antaeotricha
- Species: A. arachnia

Binomial name
- Antaeotricha arachnia (Meyrick, 1915)

Synonyms
- Stenoma arachnia Meyrick, 1915

Species of moth in genus Antaeotricha

Antaeotricha arachnia is a moth of the family Depressariidae. It is found in Guyana.

The wingspan is about 24 mm. The forewings are white, all veins marked with streaks of fuscous suffusion and with dark fuscous dots on the termen between the veins. The hindwings are whitish.
