= Antaeotricha murinella =

Scientific classification
- Kingdom: Animalia
- Phylum: Arthropoda
- Class: Insecta
- Order: Lepidoptera
- Family: Depressariidae
- Genus: Antaeotricha
- Species: A. murinella

Binomial name
- Antaeotricha murinella (Walker, 1864)

Synonyms
- Cryptolechia murinella Walker, 1864

Species of moth

Antaeotricha murinella is a moth in the family Depressariidae. It was described by Francis Walker in 1864. It is found in Amazonas, Brazil.

Adults are mouse coloured, the forewings with a whitish oblique apical space extending from four-fifths of the length of the costa nearly to the hind end of the exterior border, and containing some cinereous points. The marginal points are black.
