= Antaeotricha spurca =

Scientific classification
- Kingdom: Animalia
- Phylum: Arthropoda
- Clade: Pancrustacea
- Class: Insecta
- Order: Lepidoptera
- Family: Depressariidae
- Genus: Antaeotricha
- Species: A. spurca

Binomial name
- Antaeotricha spurca (Zeller, 1855)

Synonyms
- Cryptolechia spurca Zeller, 1855; Cryptolechia humeriferella Walker, 1864; Cryptolechia erschoffii Zeller, 1877

Species of moth

Antaeotricha spurca is a moth in the family Depressariidae. It was described by Philipp Christoph Zeller in 1855. It is found in Amazonas, Brazil.
