= Antaeotricha disjecta =

Scientific classification
- Kingdom: Animalia
- Phylum: Arthropoda
- Clade: Pancrustacea
- Class: Insecta
- Order: Lepidoptera
- Family: Depressariidae
- Genus: Antaeotricha
- Species: A. disjecta

Binomial name
- Antaeotricha disjecta (Zeller, 1854)

Synonyms
- Cryptolechia disjecta Zeller, 1854

Species of moth

Antaeotricha disjecta is a moth in the family Depressariidae. It was described by Philipp Christoph Zeller in 1854. It is found in Costa Rica, the Guianas, Bolivia and Brazil (Para).
