= Antaeotricha juvenalis =

Scientific classification
- Domain: Eukaryota
- Kingdom: Animalia
- Phylum: Arthropoda
- Class: Insecta
- Order: Lepidoptera
- Family: Depressariidae
- Genus: Antaeotricha
- Species: A. juvenalis

Binomial name
- Antaeotricha juvenalis (Meyrick, 1930)

Synonyms
- Stenoma juvenalis Meyrick, 1930

Species of moth

Antaeotricha juvenalis is a moth in the family Depressariidae. It was described by Edward Meyrick in 1930. It is found in Brazil.
