= Antaeotricha destillata =

Scientific classification
- Kingdom: Animalia
- Phylum: Arthropoda
- Clade: Pancrustacea
- Class: Insecta
- Order: Lepidoptera
- Family: Depressariidae
- Genus: Antaeotricha
- Species: A. destillata

Binomial name
- Antaeotricha destillata (Zeller, 1877)

Synonyms
- Cryptolechia destillata Zeller, 1877

Species of moth

Antaeotricha destillata is a moth in the family Depressariidae. It was described by Philipp Christoph Zeller in 1877. It is found in Panama and Colombia.
