= Antaeotricha copromima =

Scientific classification
- Domain: Eukaryota
- Kingdom: Animalia
- Phylum: Arthropoda
- Class: Insecta
- Order: Lepidoptera
- Family: Depressariidae
- Genus: Antaeotricha
- Species: A. copromima

Binomial name
- Antaeotricha copromima Meyrick, 1930

Synonyms
- Stenoma citrophaea Meyrick, 1931

Species of moth

Antaeotricha copromima is a moth in the family Depressariidae. It was described by Edward Meyrick in 1930. It is found in French Guiana and Brazil.
