= Antaeotricha cicadella =

Scientific classification
- Kingdom: Animalia
- Phylum: Arthropoda
- Class: Insecta
- Order: Lepidoptera
- Family: Depressariidae
- Genus: Antaeotricha
- Species: A. cicadella

Binomial name
- Antaeotricha cicadella (Sepp, [1830])

Synonyms
- Phalaena (Tinea) cicadella Sepp, [1830]

Species of moth

Antaeotricha cicadella is a moth in the family Depressariidae. It was described by Sepp in 1830. It is found in the Guianas.
