= Antaeotricha sortifera =

Scientific classification
- Domain: Eukaryota
- Kingdom: Animalia
- Phylum: Arthropoda
- Class: Insecta
- Order: Lepidoptera
- Family: Depressariidae
- Genus: Antaeotricha
- Species: A. sortifera

Binomial name
- Antaeotricha sortifera Meyrick, 1930

Species of moth

Antaeotricha sortifera is a moth in the family Depressariidae. It was described by Edward Meyrick in 1930. It is found in Bolivia.

The wingspan is about 22 mm.
