= Antaeotricha venezuelensis =

Scientific classification
- Domain: Eukaryota
- Kingdom: Animalia
- Phylum: Arthropoda
- Class: Insecta
- Order: Lepidoptera
- Family: Depressariidae
- Genus: Antaeotricha
- Species: A. venezuelensis

Binomial name
- Antaeotricha venezuelensis Amsel, 1956

Species of moth

Antaeotricha venezuelensis is a moth in the family Depressariidae. It was described by Hans Georg Amsel in 1956. It is found in Venezuela.
