= Antaeotricha monocolona =

Scientific classification
- Kingdom: Animalia
- Phylum: Arthropoda
- Class: Insecta
- Order: Lepidoptera
- Family: Depressariidae
- Genus: Antaeotricha
- Species: A. monocolona

Binomial name
- Antaeotricha monocolona Meyrick, 1932

Species of moth

Antaeotricha monocolona is a moth in the family Depressariidae. It was described by Edward Meyrick in 1932. It is found in Bolivia.
