= Antaeotricha parastis =

Scientific classification
- Kingdom: Animalia
- Phylum: Arthropoda
- Class: Insecta
- Order: Lepidoptera
- Family: Depressariidae
- Genus: Antaeotricha
- Species: A. parastis

Binomial name
- Antaeotricha parastis van Gijen, 1913

Species of moth

Antaeotricha parastis is a moth in the family Depressariidae. It was described by van Gijen in 1913. It is found in Chile.
