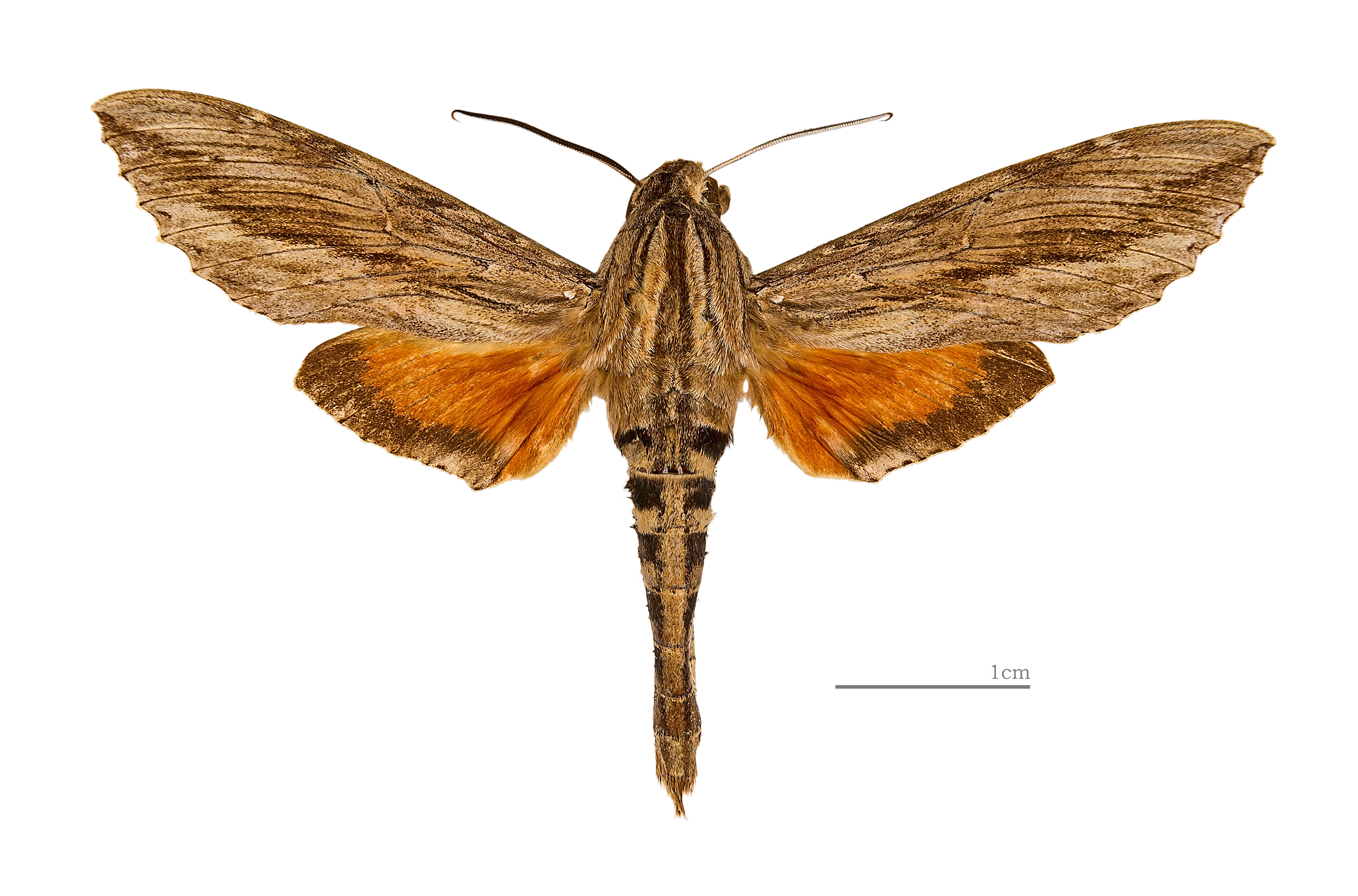
- Erinnyis ello - MHNT

Scientific classification
- Domain: Eukaryota
- Kingdom: Animalia
- Phylum: Arthropoda
- Class: Insecta
- Order: Lepidoptera
- Family: Sphingidae
- Subfamily: Macroglossinae
- Tribe: Dilophonotini; Burmeister, 1878

Genera
- See text

= Dilophonotini =

Tribe of moths

Dilophonotini is a tribe of moths of the family Sphingidae described by Hermann Burmeister in 1878.

== Taxonomy ==
- Subtribe Dilophonotina Burmeister, 1878
  - Genus Aellopos Hübner, 1819
  - Genus Aleuron Boisduval, 1870
  - Genus Baniwa Lichy, 1981
  - Genus Callionima Lucas, 1857
  - Genus Cautethia Grote, 1865
  - Genus Enyo Hübner, 1819
  - Genus Erinnyis Hübner, 1819
  - Genus Eupyrrhoglossum Grote, 1865
  - Genus Hemeroplanes Hübner, 1819
  - Genus Himantoides Butler, 1876
  - Genus Isognathus C. & R. Felder, 1862
  - Genus Kloneus Skinner, 1923
  - Genus Madoryx Boisduval, 1875
  - Genus Nyceryx Boisduval, 1875
  - Genus Oryba Walker, 1856
  - Genus Pachygonidia D. S. Fletcher, 1982
  - Genus Pachylia Walker, 1856
  - Genus Pachylioides Hodges, 1971
  - Genus Perigonia Herrich-Schäffer, 1854
  - Genus Phryxus Hübner, 1819
  - Genus Protaleuron Rothschild & Jordan, 1903
  - Genus Pseudosphinx Burmeister, 1856
  - Genus Stolidoptera Rothschild & Jordan, 1903
  - Genus Unzela Walker, 1856
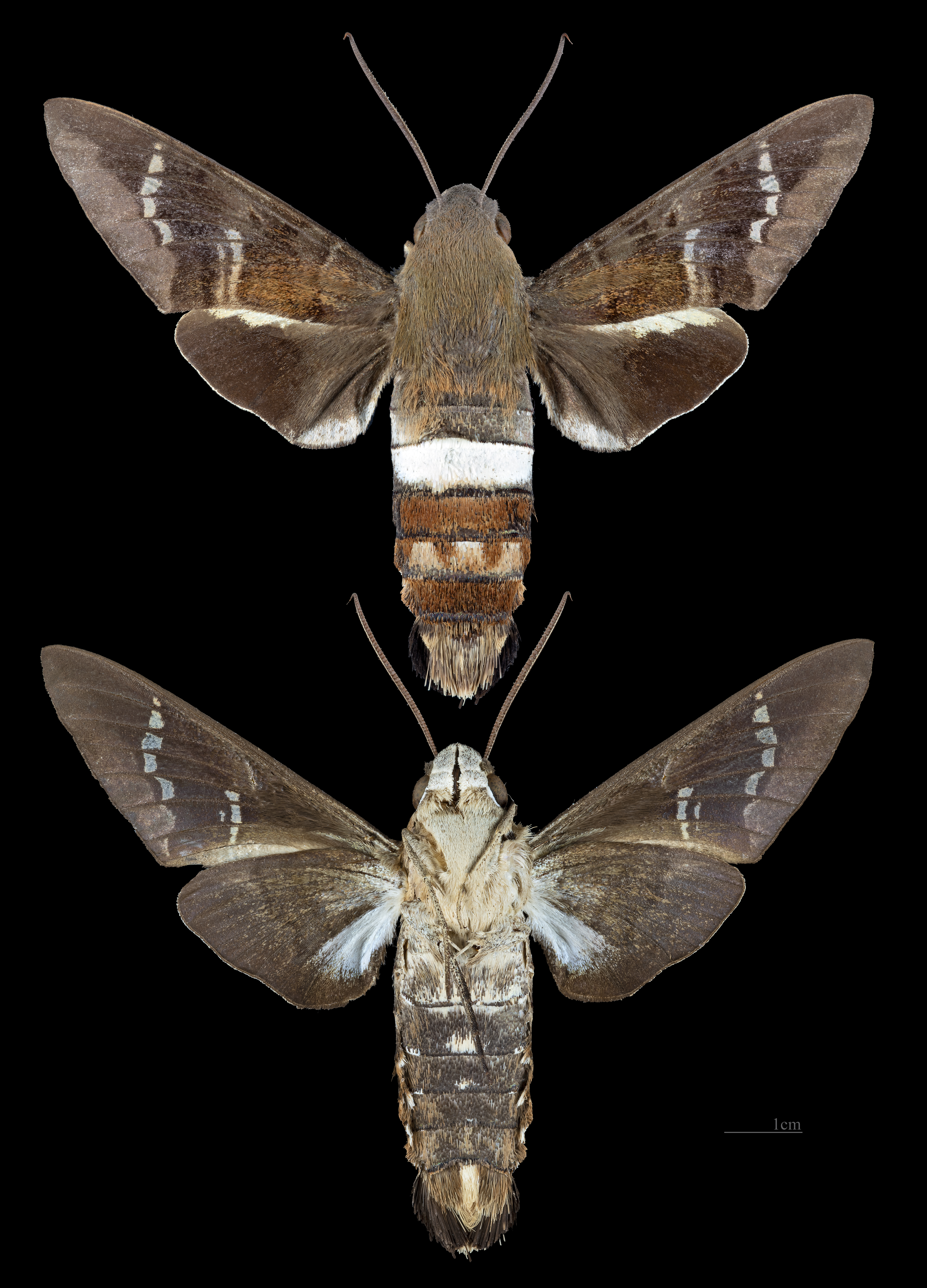
Aellopos

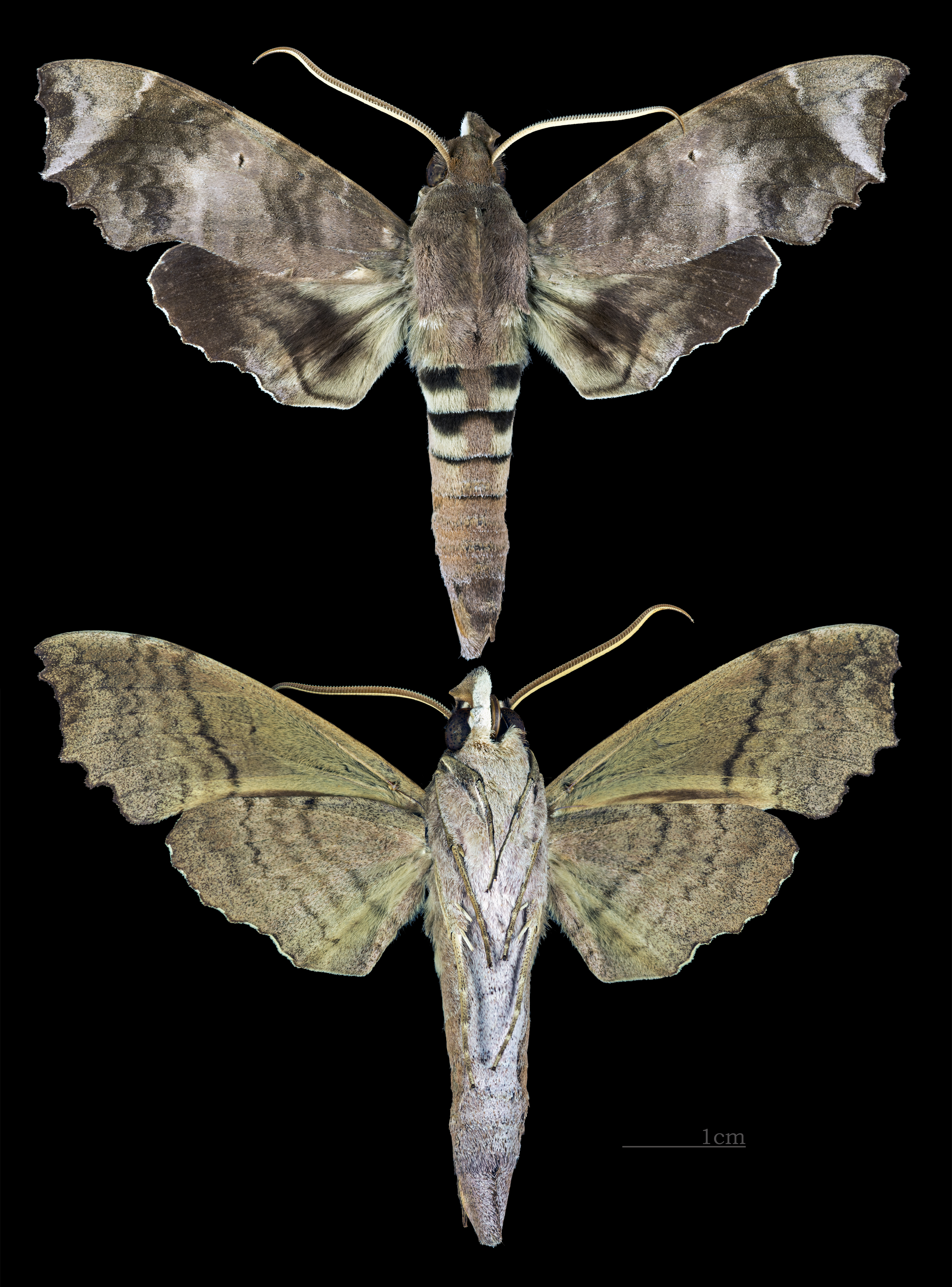
Aleuron

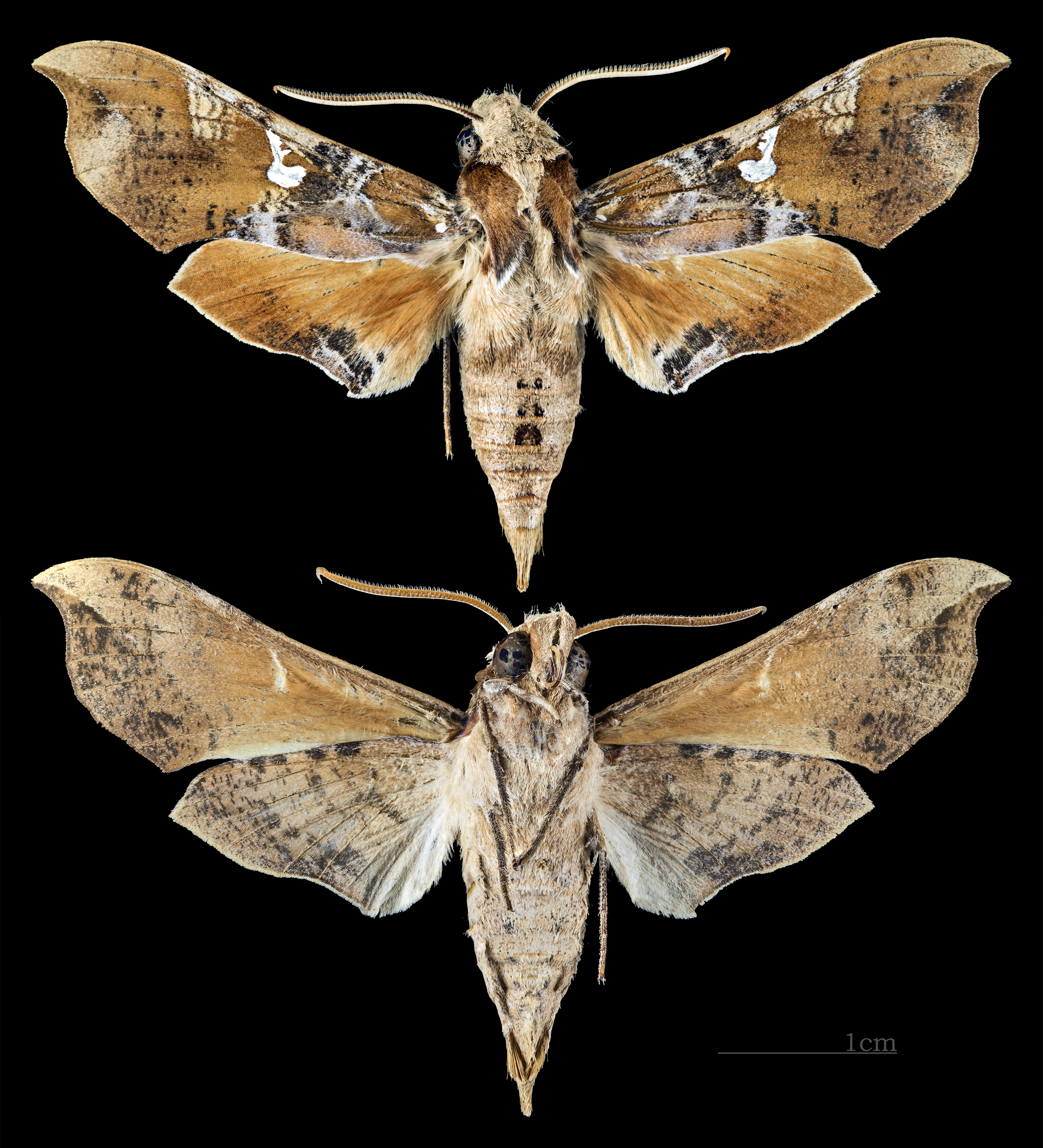
Callionima

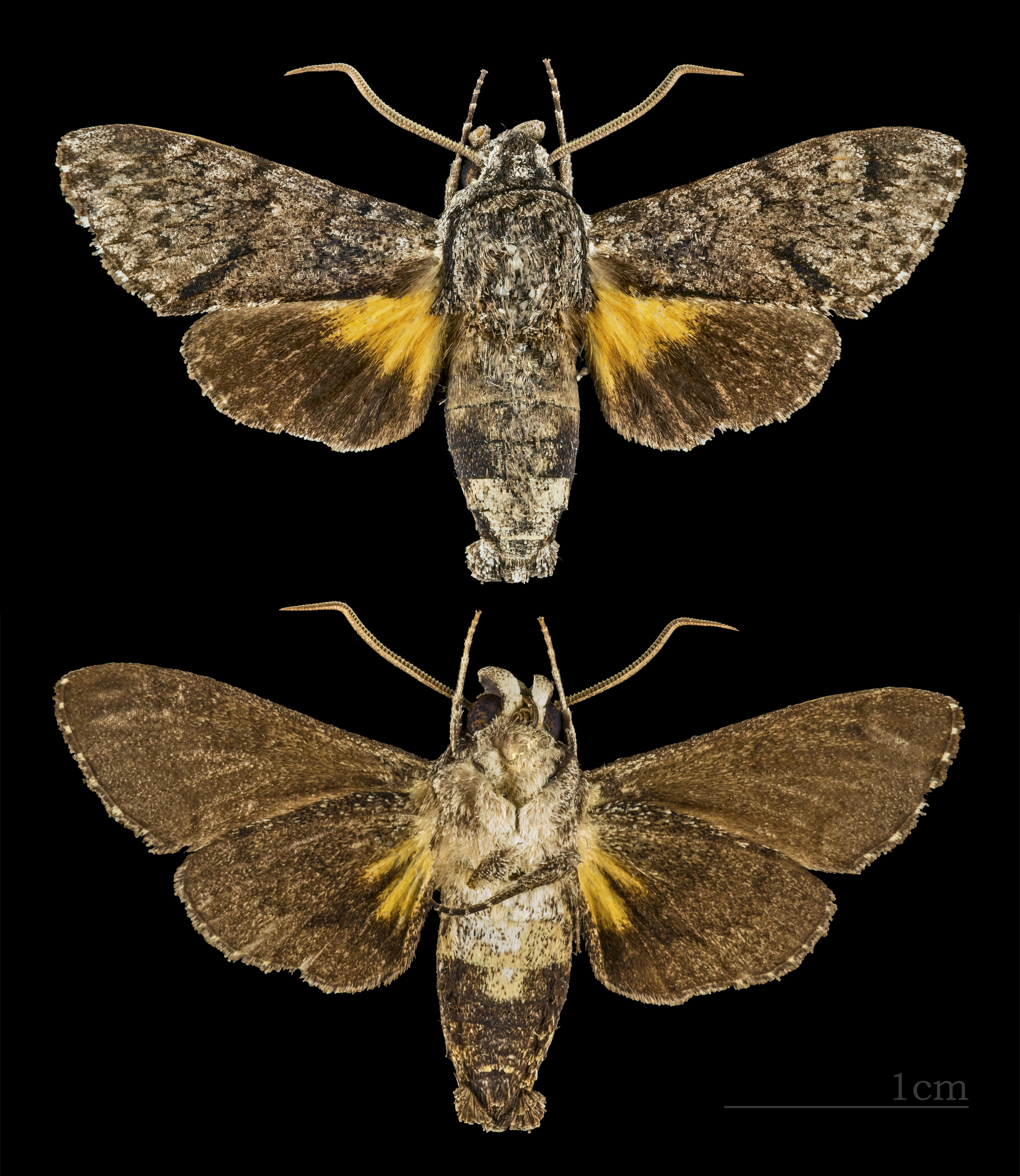
Cautethia

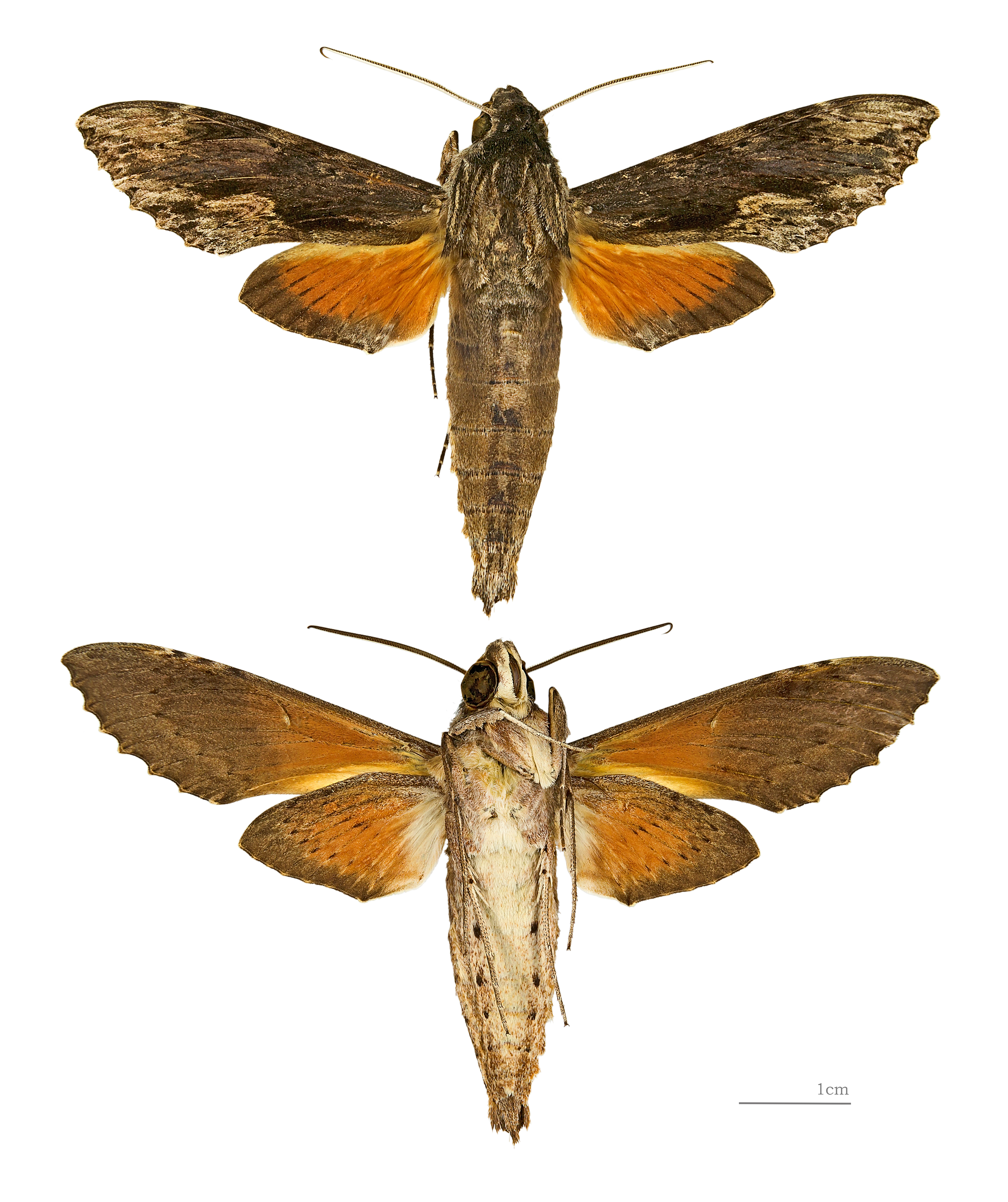
Erinnyis

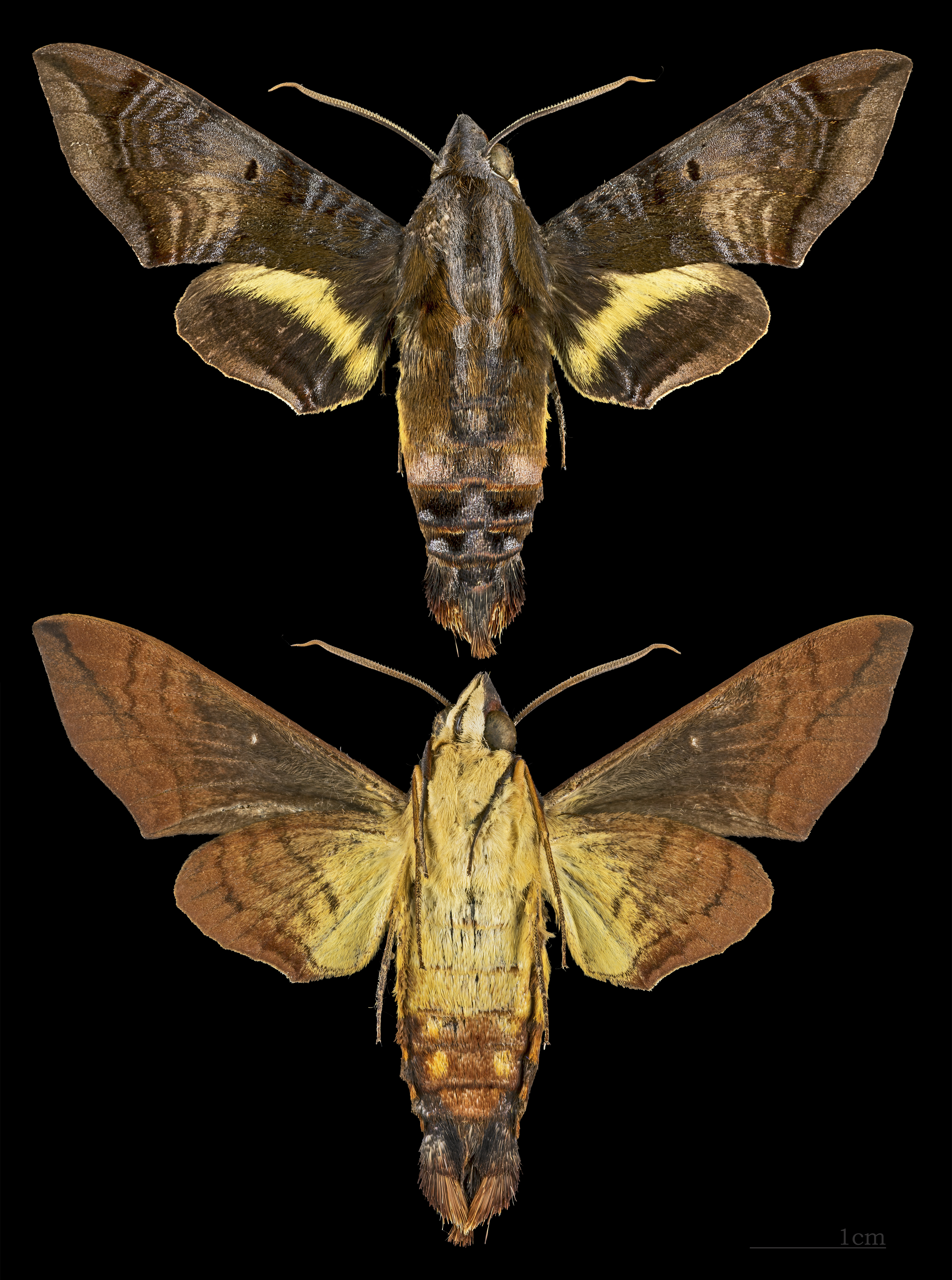
Eupyrrhoglossum

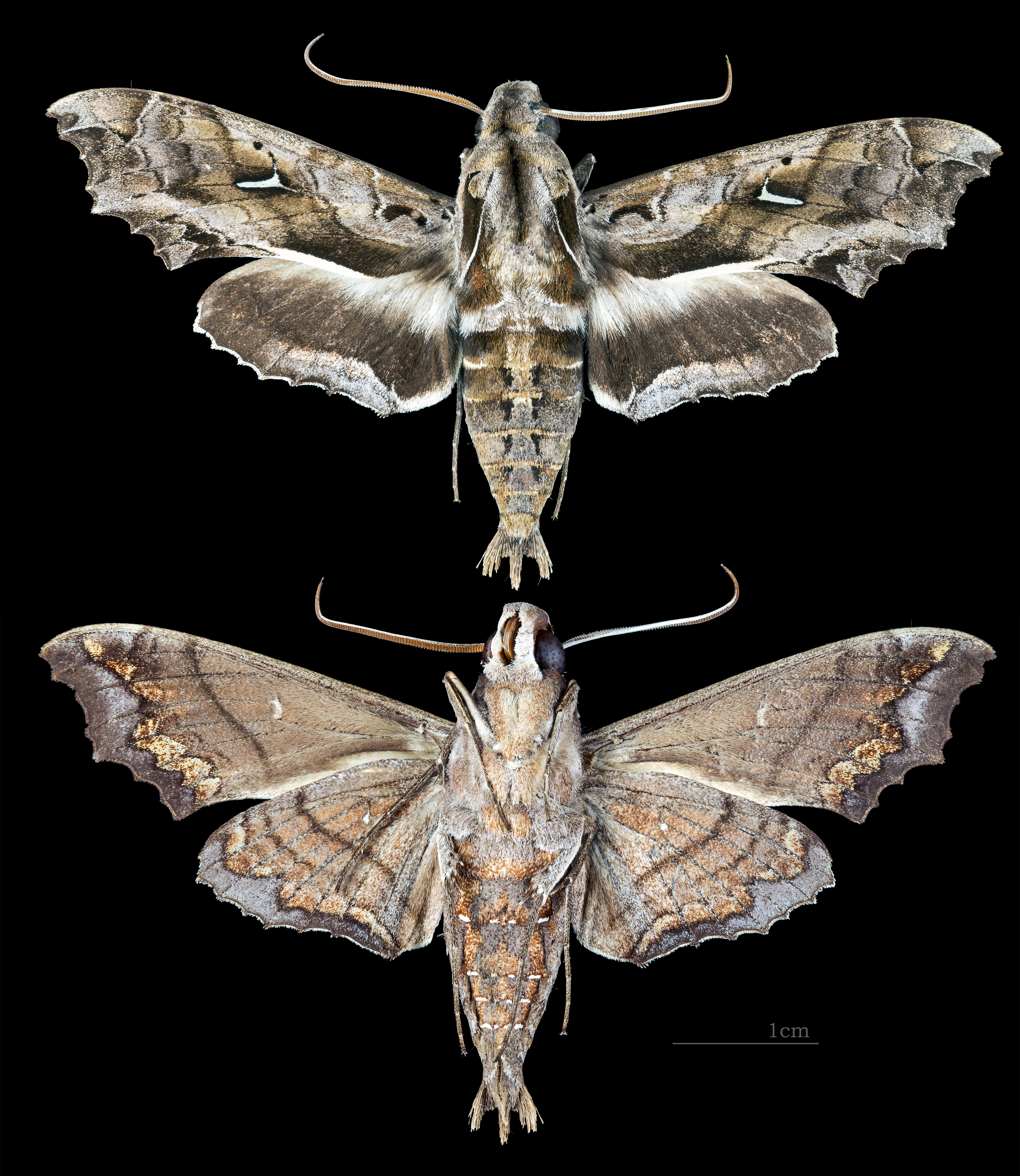
Hemeroplanes

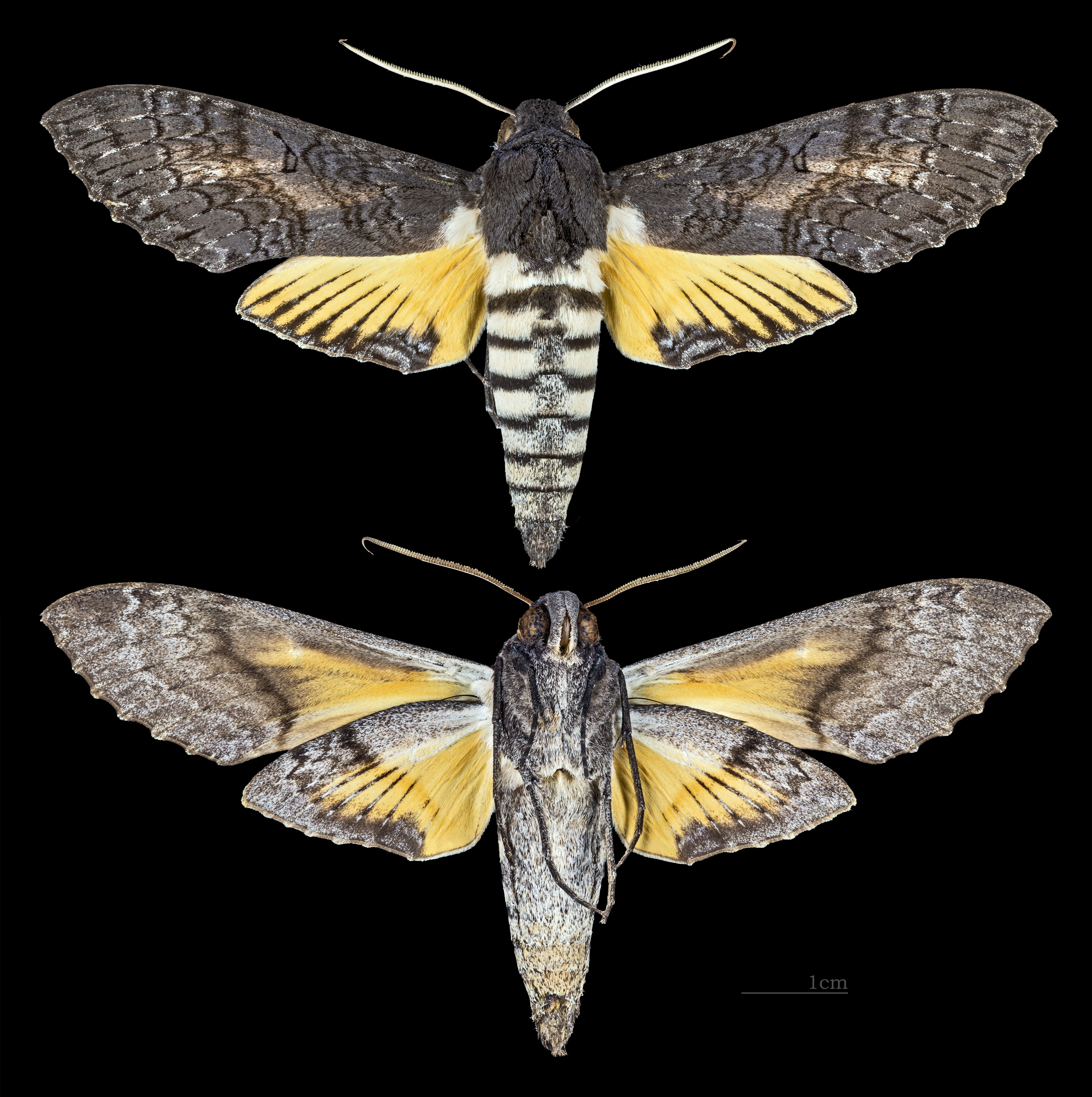
Isognathus

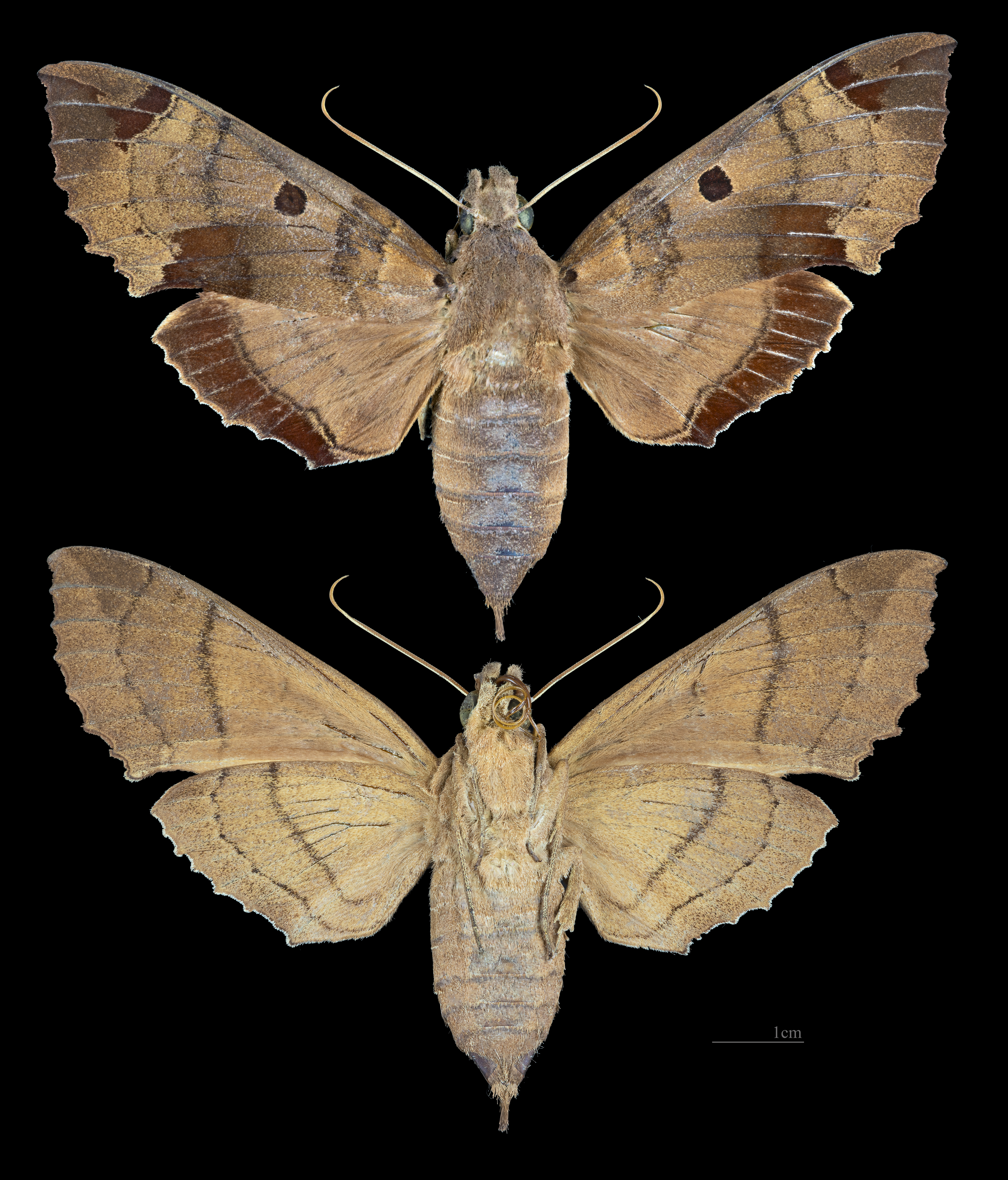
Kloneus

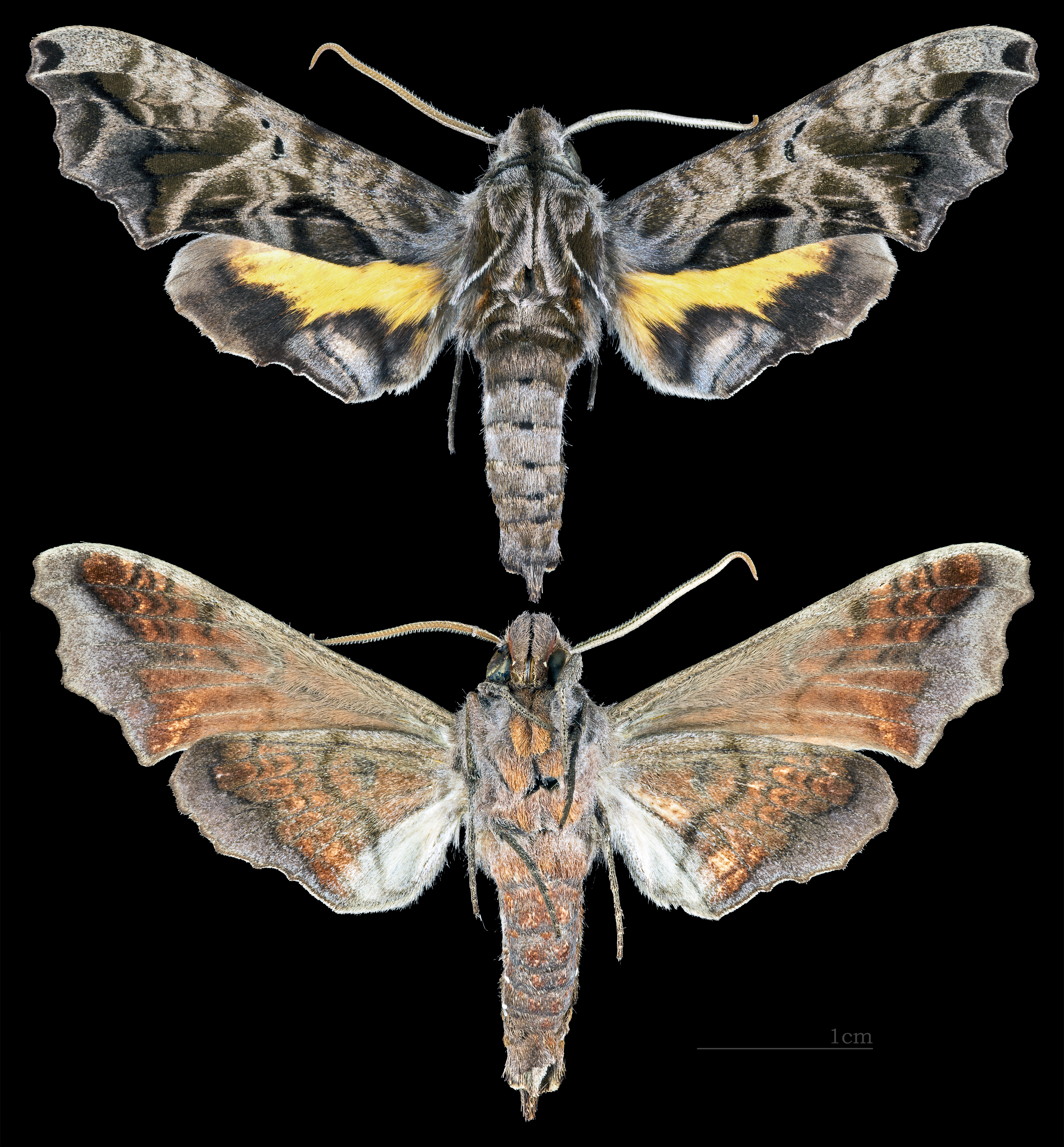
Nyceryx

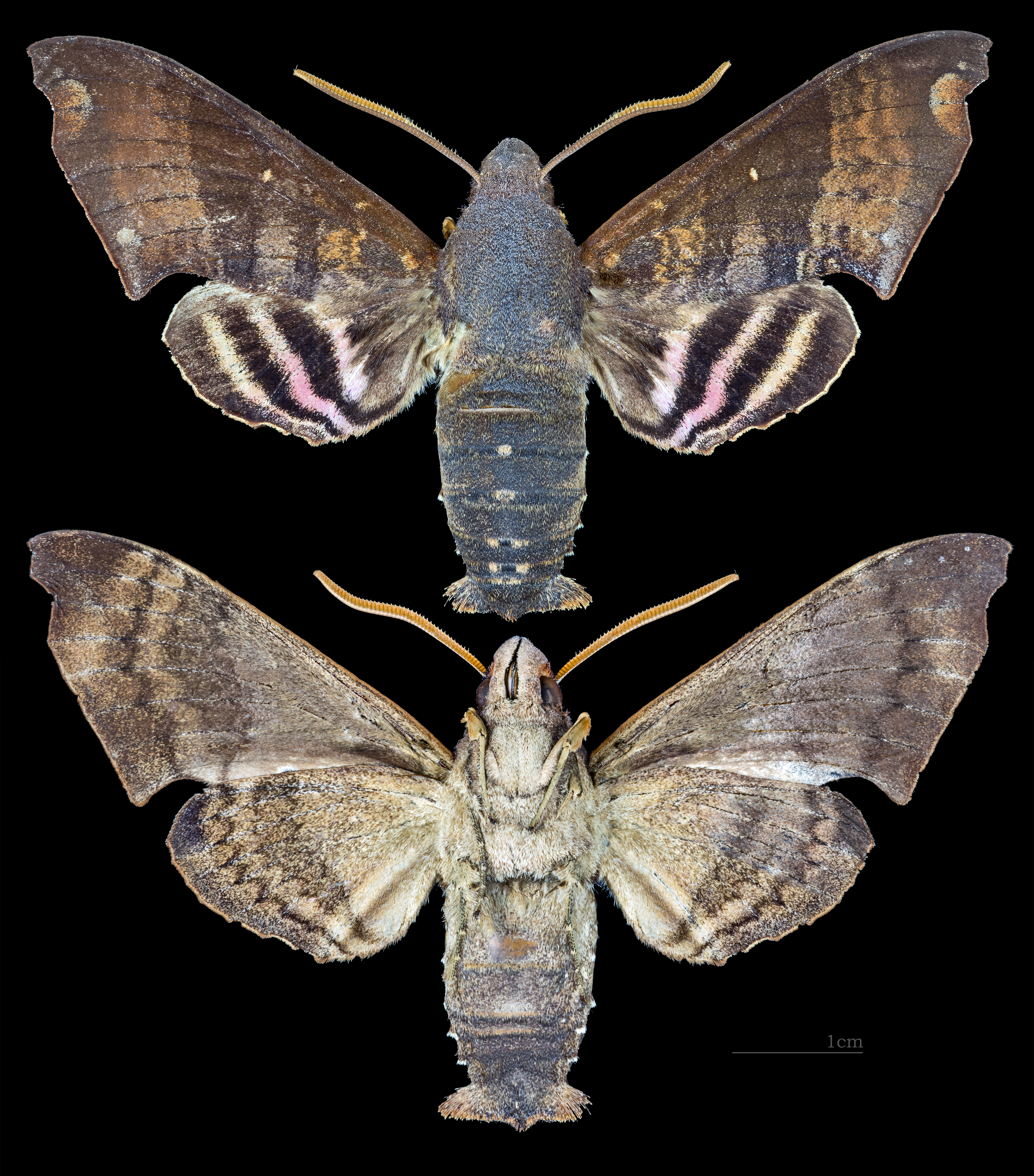
Pachygonidia

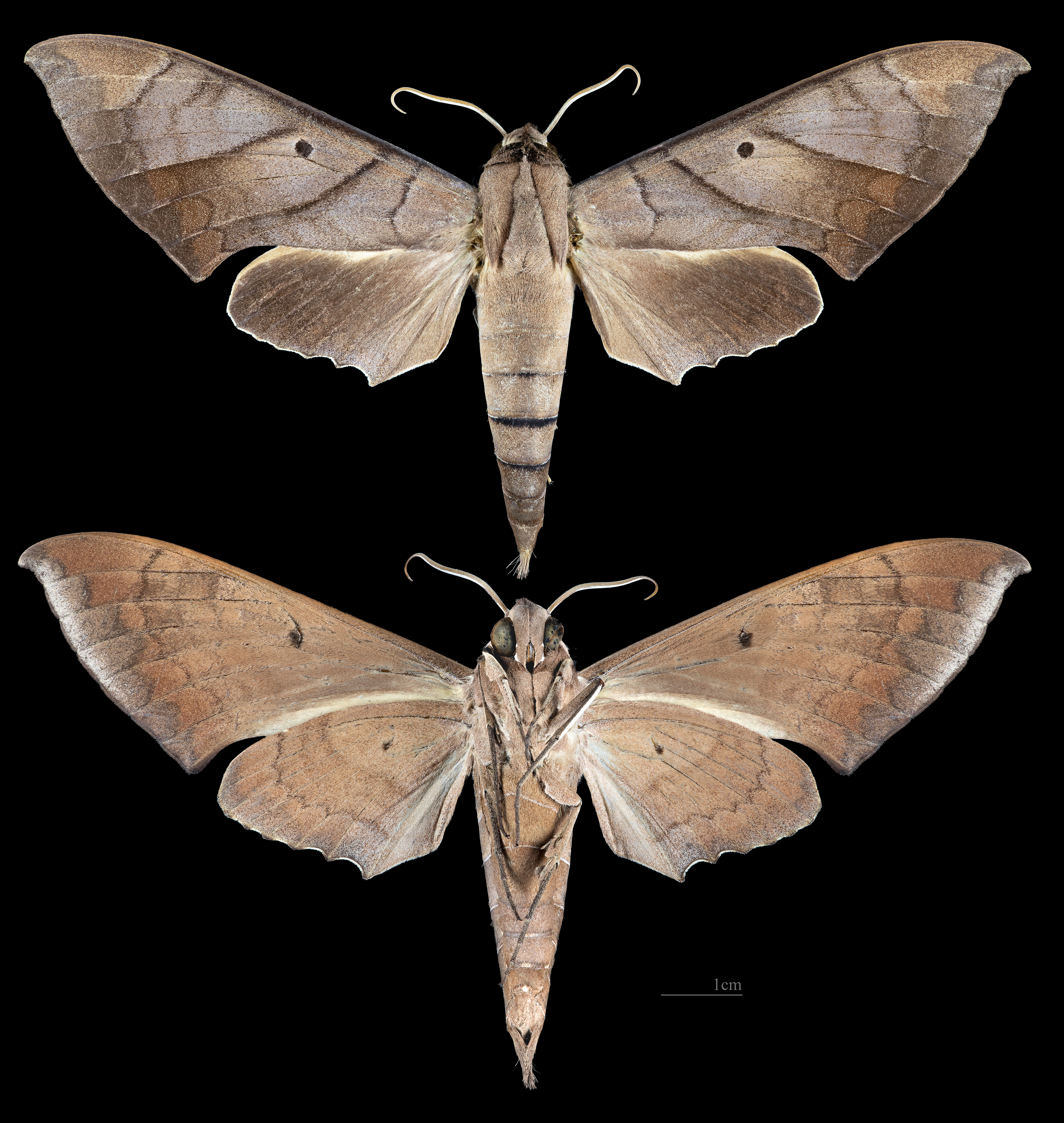
Pachylia

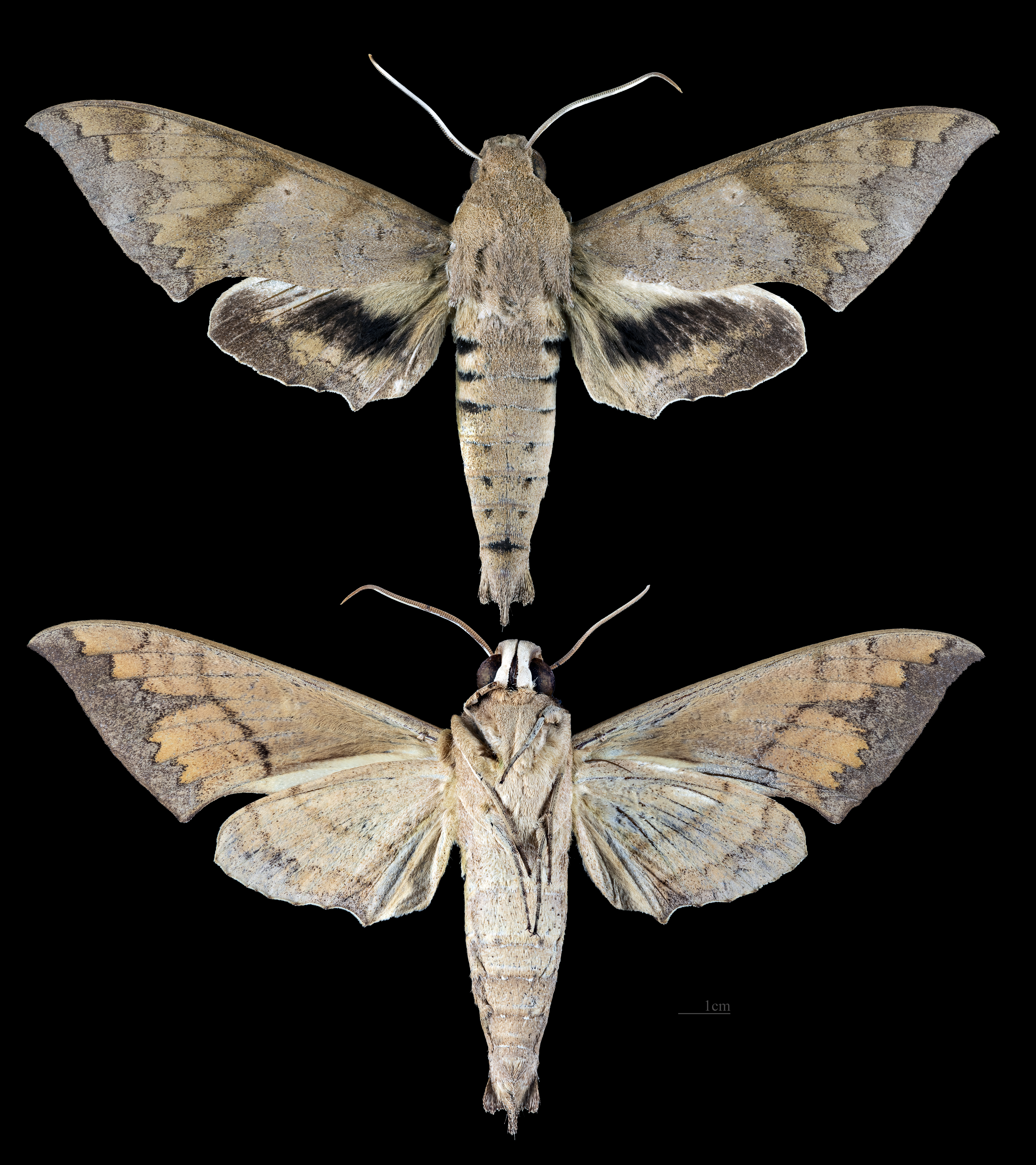
Pachylioides

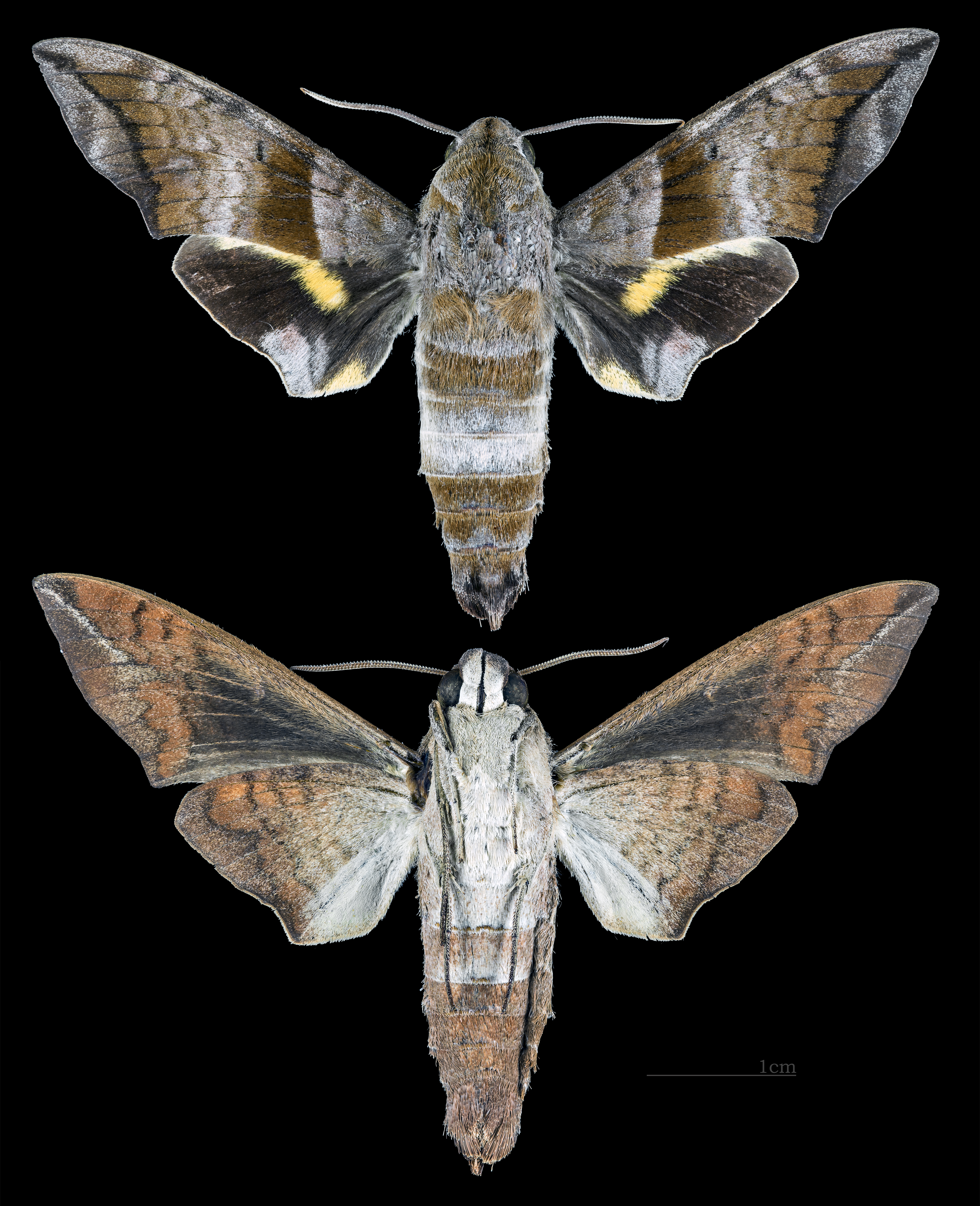
Perigonia

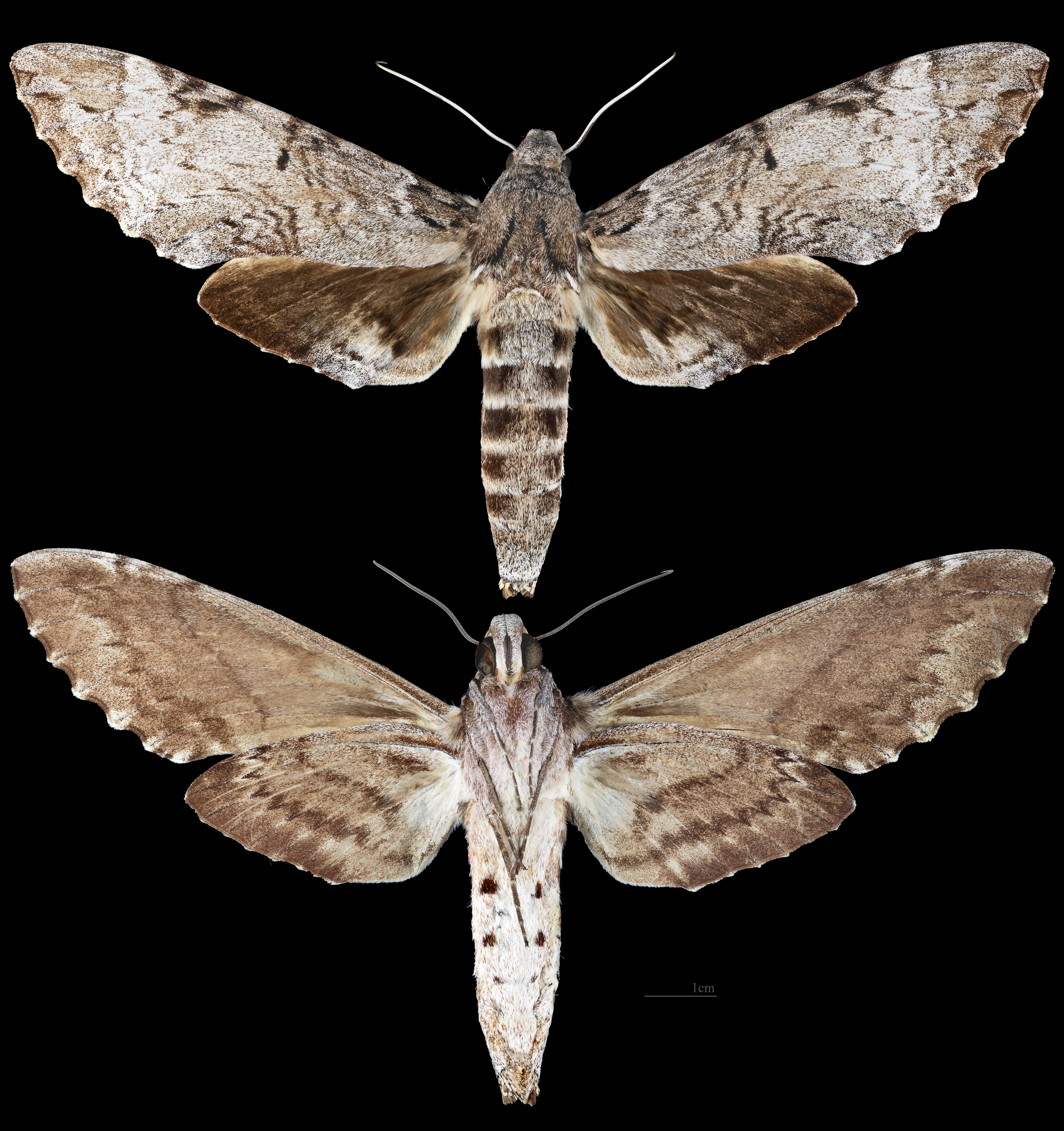
Pseudosphinx

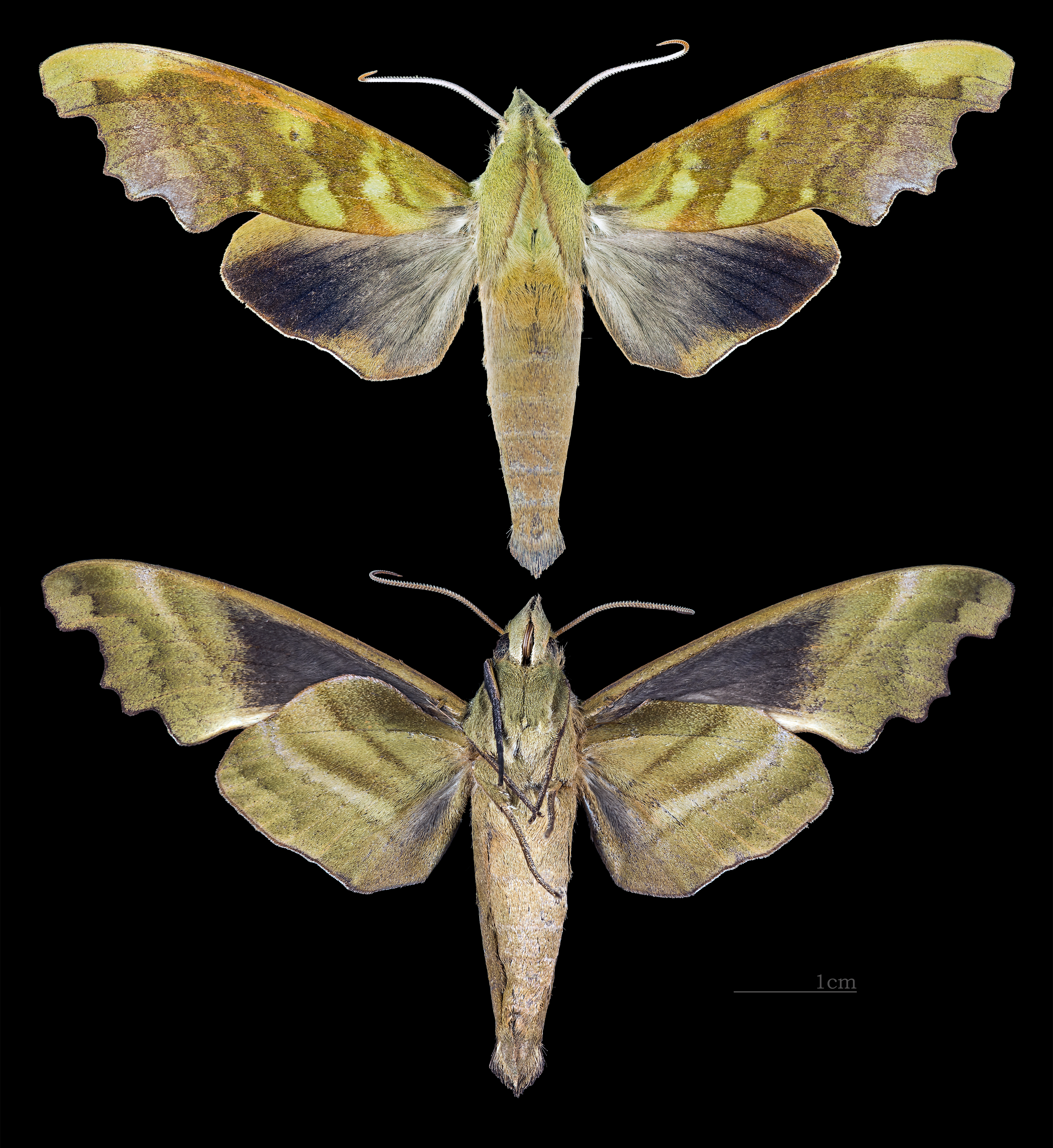
Stolidoptera

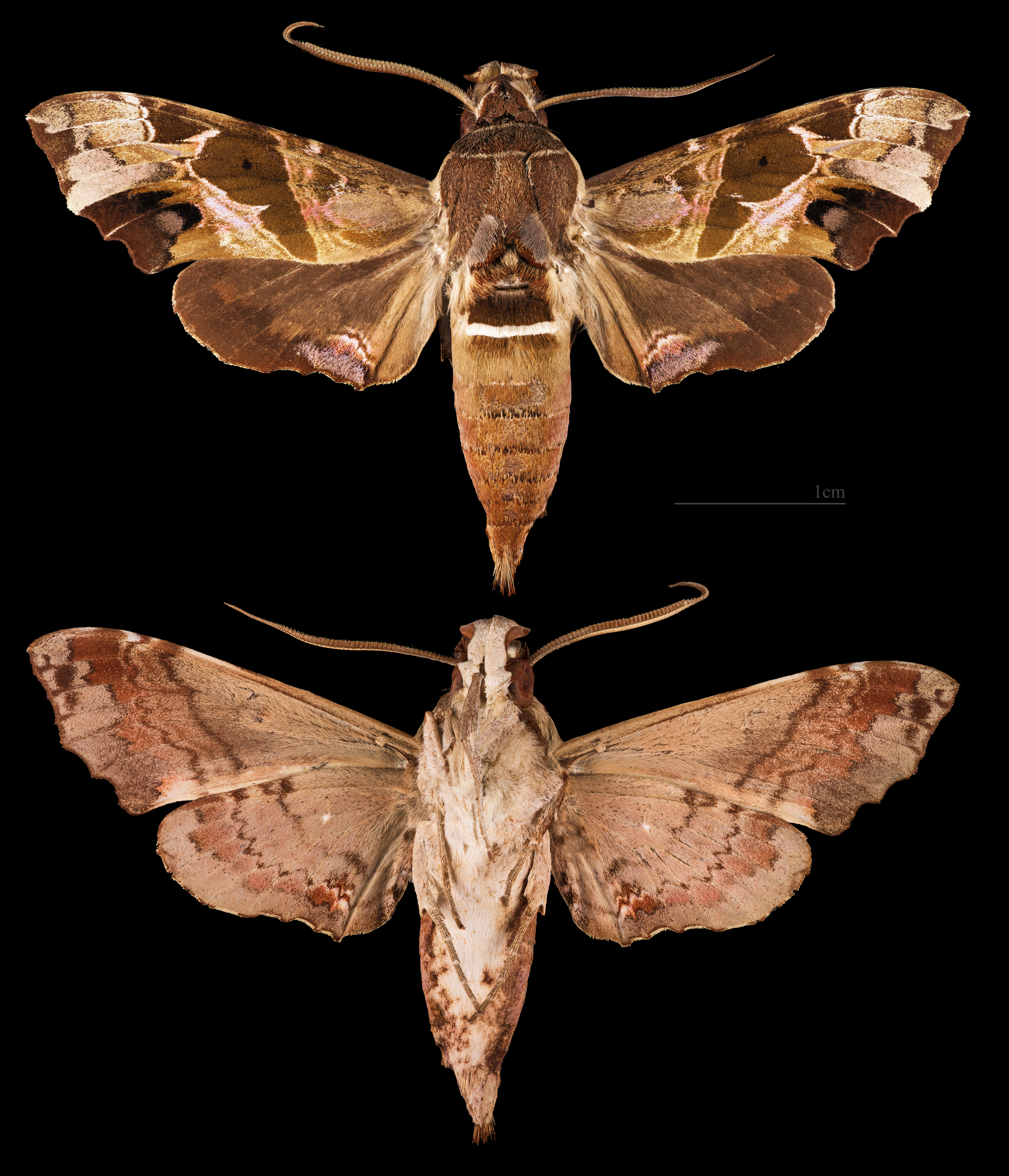
Unzela
- Subtribe Hemarina Tutt, 1902
  - Genus Cephonodes Hubner, 1819
  - Genus Hemaris Dalman, 1816
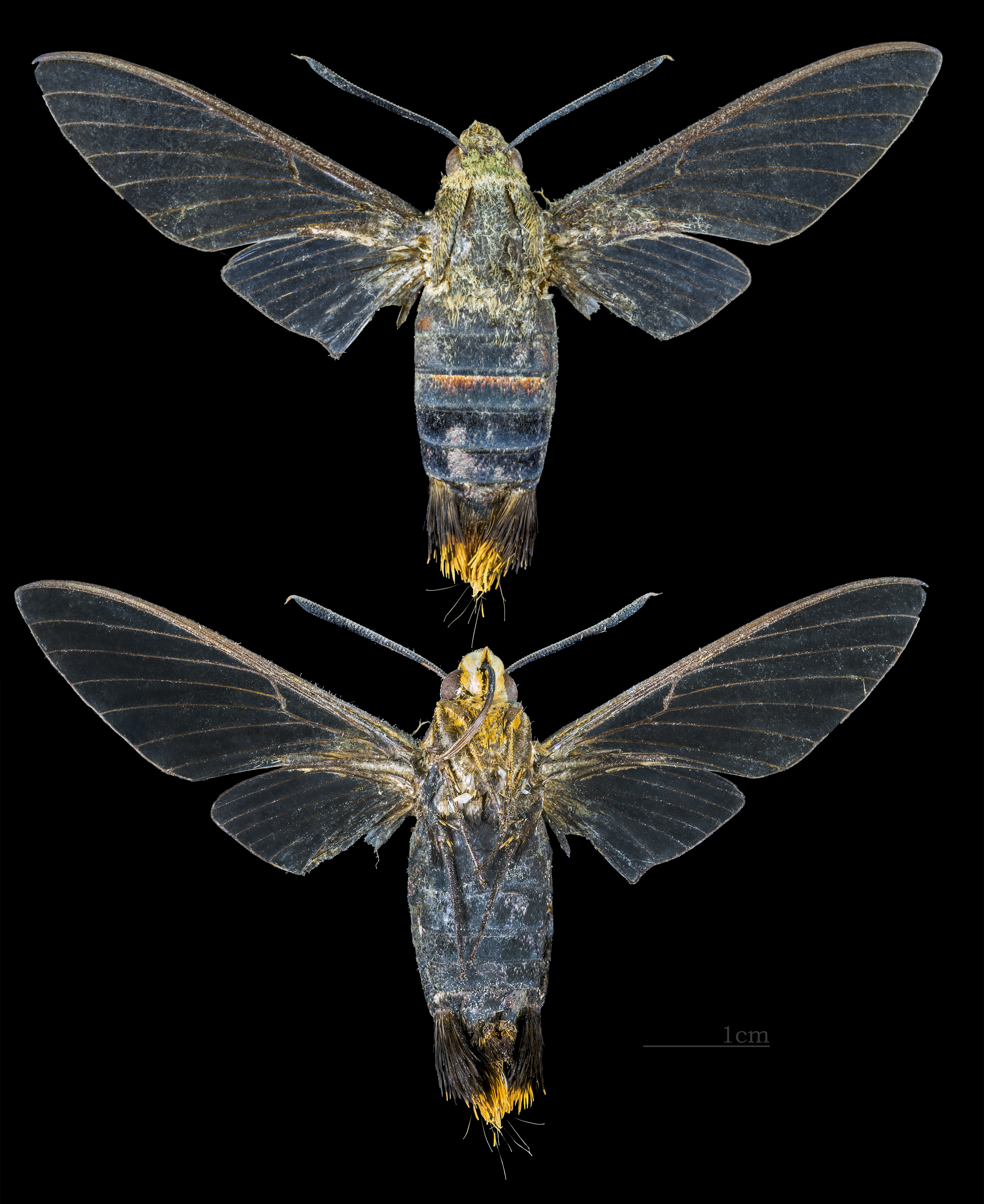
Cephonodes

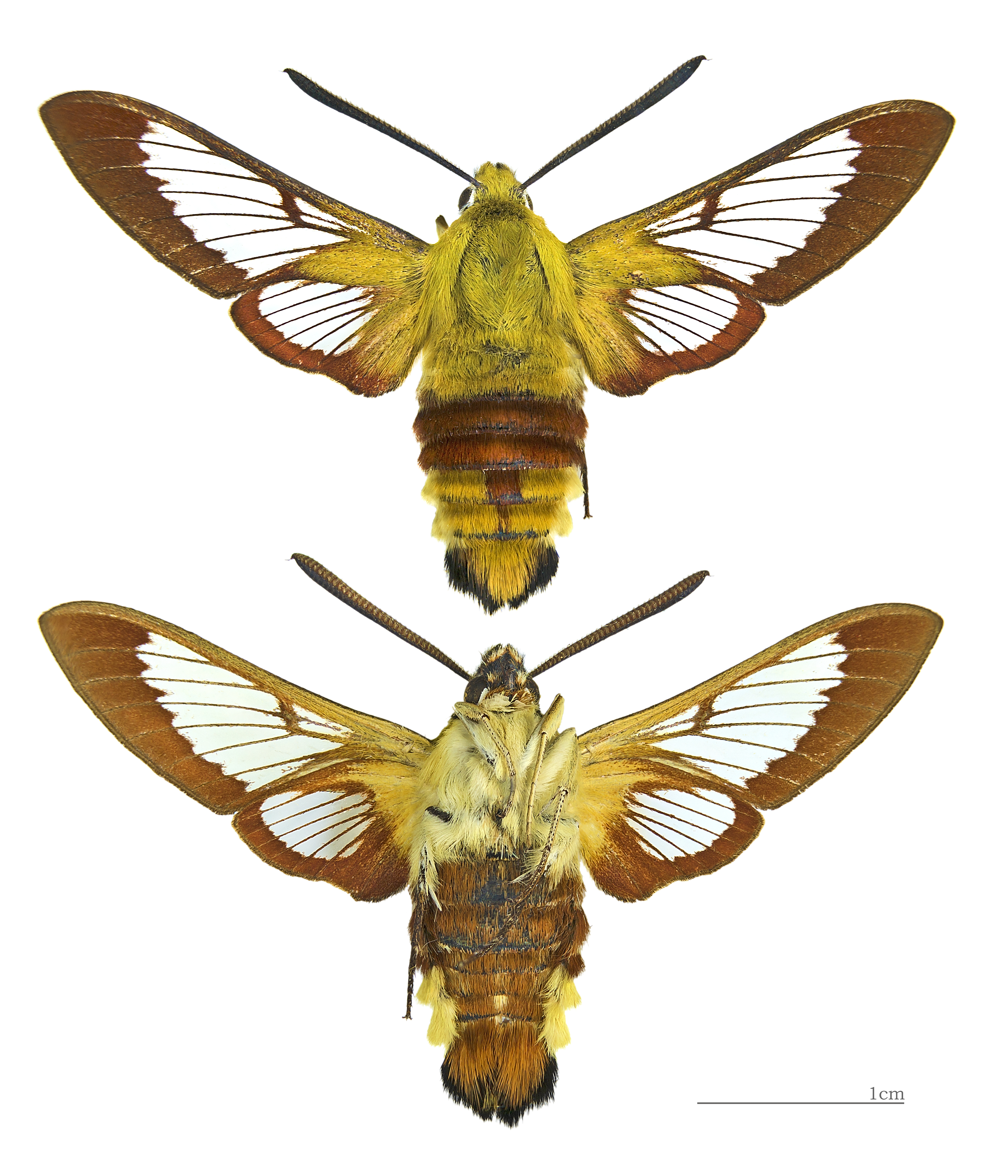
Hemaris
