= Phryxus =

Phryxus may refer to:

- an alternative spelling for Phrixus, the son of Athamas, king of Boiotia, and Nephele in Greek mythology
- Phryxus (isopod), an isopod genus in the family Bopyridae
- Phryxus (moth), a moths genus in the family Sphingidae
