= Macroglossinae =

Macroglossinae can refer to two unrelated subfamilies of animals:

- Macroglossinae (Chiroptera), a type of megabat
- Macroglossinae (moth), a type of sphinx moth
