= Phryxus caicus =

- Phryxus caicus male

Scientific classification
- Kingdom: Animalia
- Phylum: Arthropoda
- Clade: Pancrustacea
- Class: Insecta
- Order: Lepidoptera
- Family: Sphingidae
- Subfamily: Macroglossinae
- Tribe: Dilophonotini
- Subtribe: Dilophonotina
- Genus: Phryxus; Hübner, 1819
- Species: P. caicus

Binomial name
- Phryxus caicus (Cramer, 1777)

Synonyms
- Grammodia Rothschild & Jordan, 1903 (synonym of genus); Sphinx caicus Cramer, 1777 (synonym of species)

Species of moth

Phryxus is a monotypic genus of moths in the family Sphingidae first described by Jacob Hübner in 1819. Its only species, Phryxus caicus, was described by Pieter Cramer in 1777.

== Distribution ==
It is found in the Neotropics, although it has been recorded from southern Florida and South Carolina.

== Description ==
The length of the forewings is 33–37 mm. South from Florida, adults are mainly found from August to November but may be found year round.

Phryxus caicus ♀

Phryxus caicus ♀ △

== Biology ==
In the tropics, larvae have been recorded on Apocynaceae species. In Florida, it has been recorded on Rhabdadenia bilfora.
