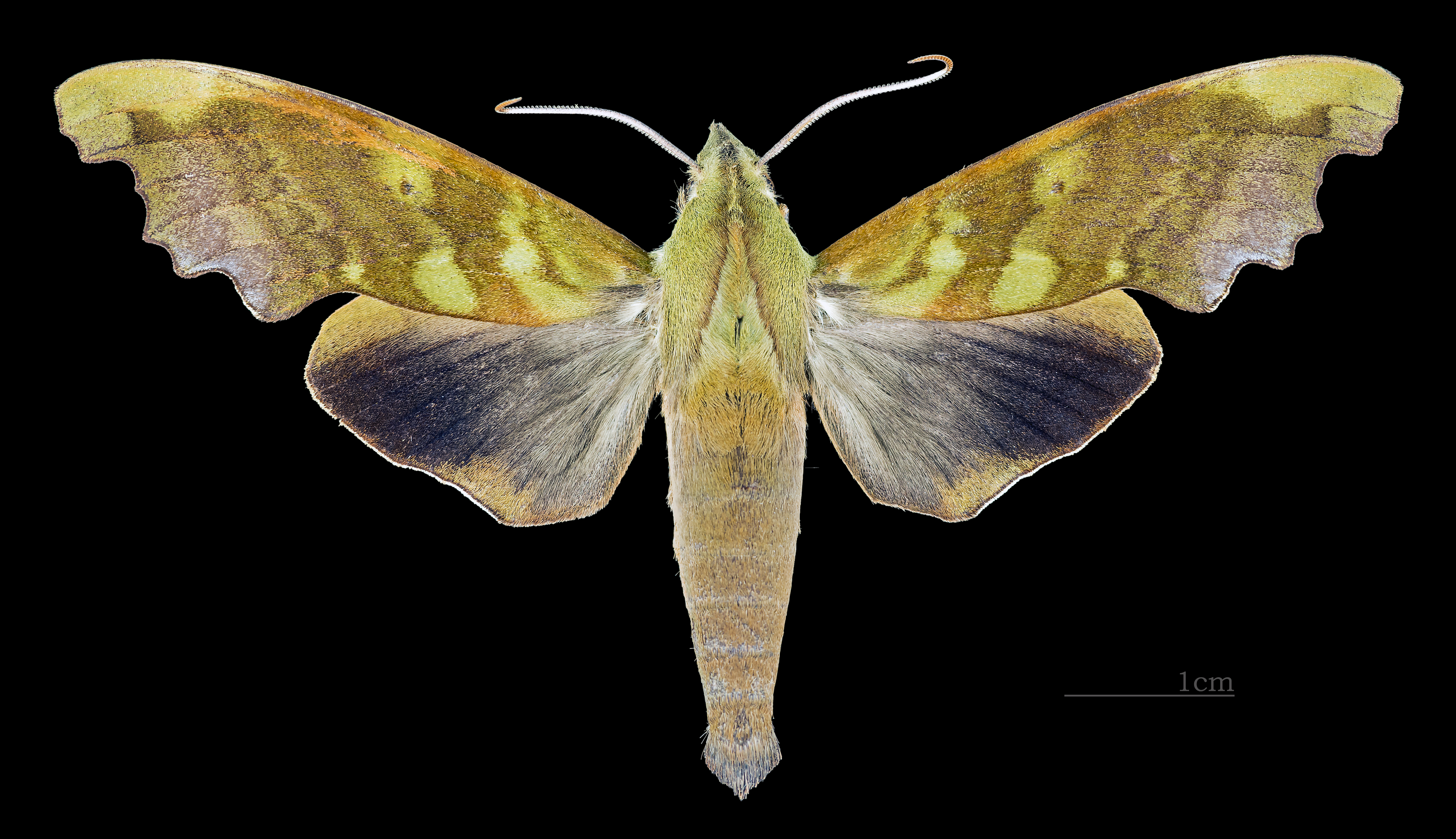
- Male
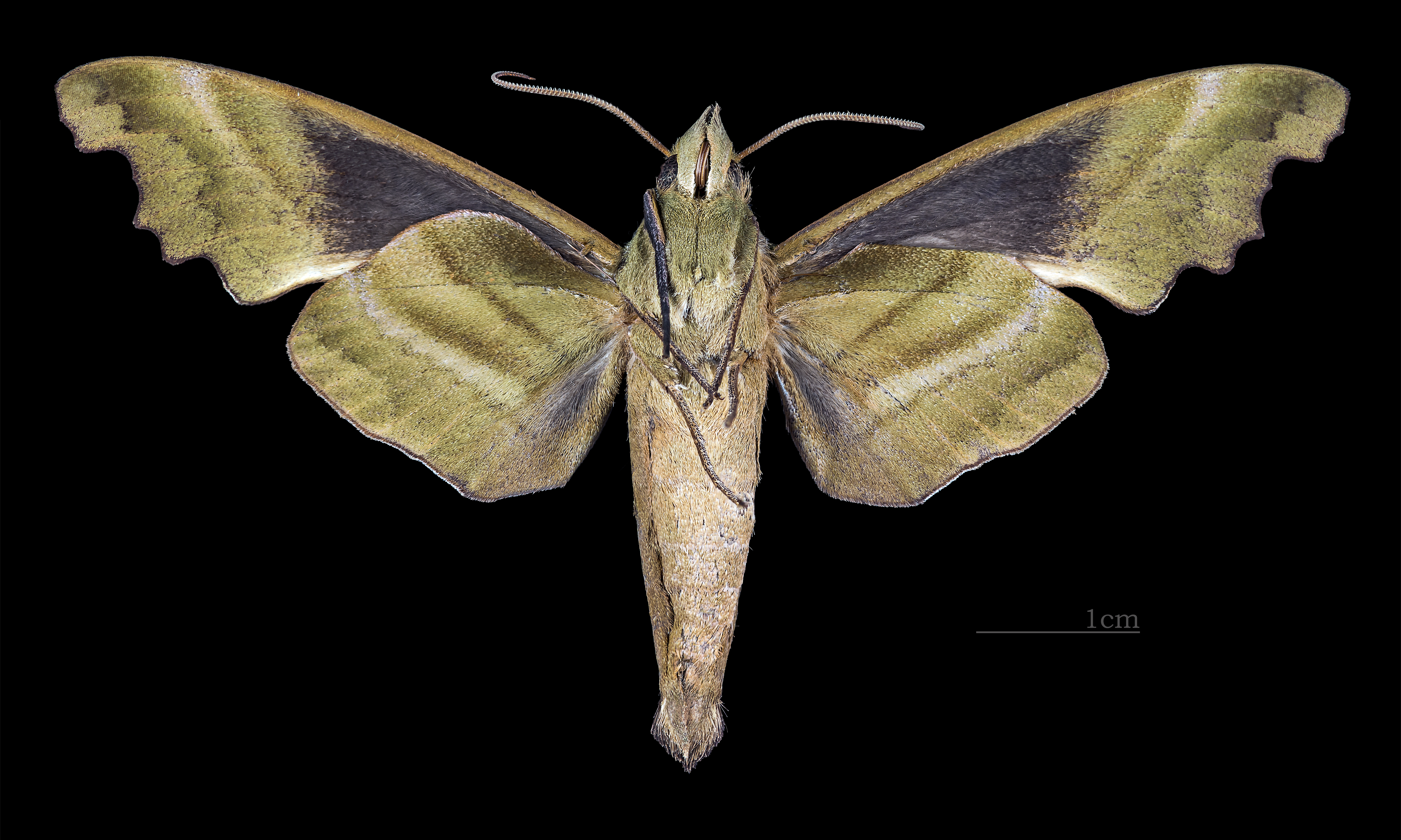
- Male underside

Scientific classification
- Domain: Eukaryota
- Kingdom: Animalia
- Phylum: Arthropoda
- Class: Insecta
- Order: Lepidoptera
- Family: Sphingidae
- Genus: Stolidoptera
- Species: S. tachasara

Binomial name
- Stolidoptera tachasara (H. Druce, 1888)

Synonyms
- Aleuron tachasara H. Druce, 1888

= Stolidoptera tachasara =

Species of moth

Stolidoptera tachasara is a moth of the family Sphingidae first described by Herbert Druce in 1888.

== Distribution ==
It is found in Mexico and Central America, as well as Venezuela in northern South America. It has also been spotted in Bolivia.

== Description ==
The wingspan is 79–92 mm.

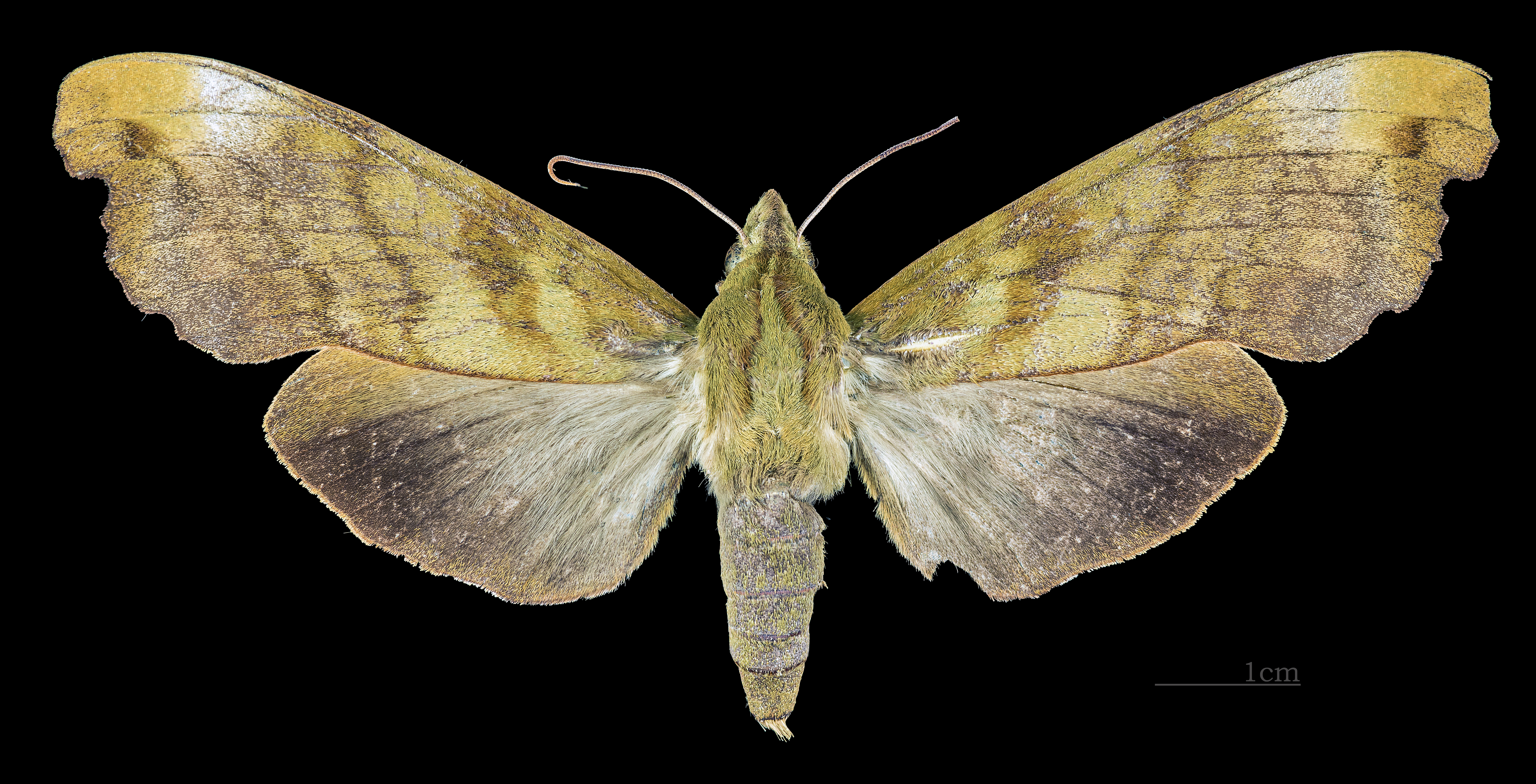
Female dorsal view

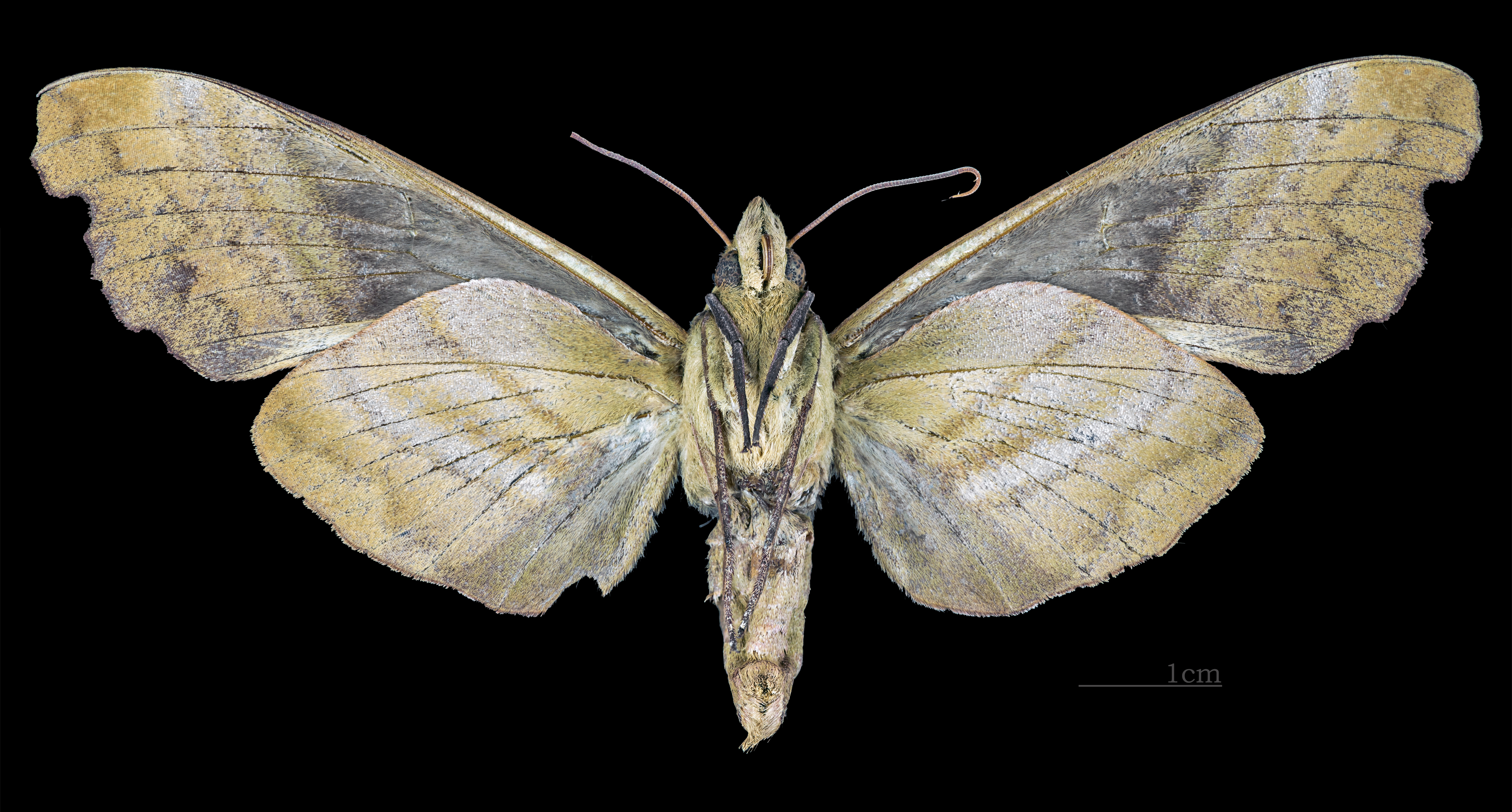
Female ventral view

== Biology ==
Adults are on wing nearly year round (except March and December) in Costa Rica.

The larvae have been recorded feeding on Thalia geniculata and Prunus annularis.
