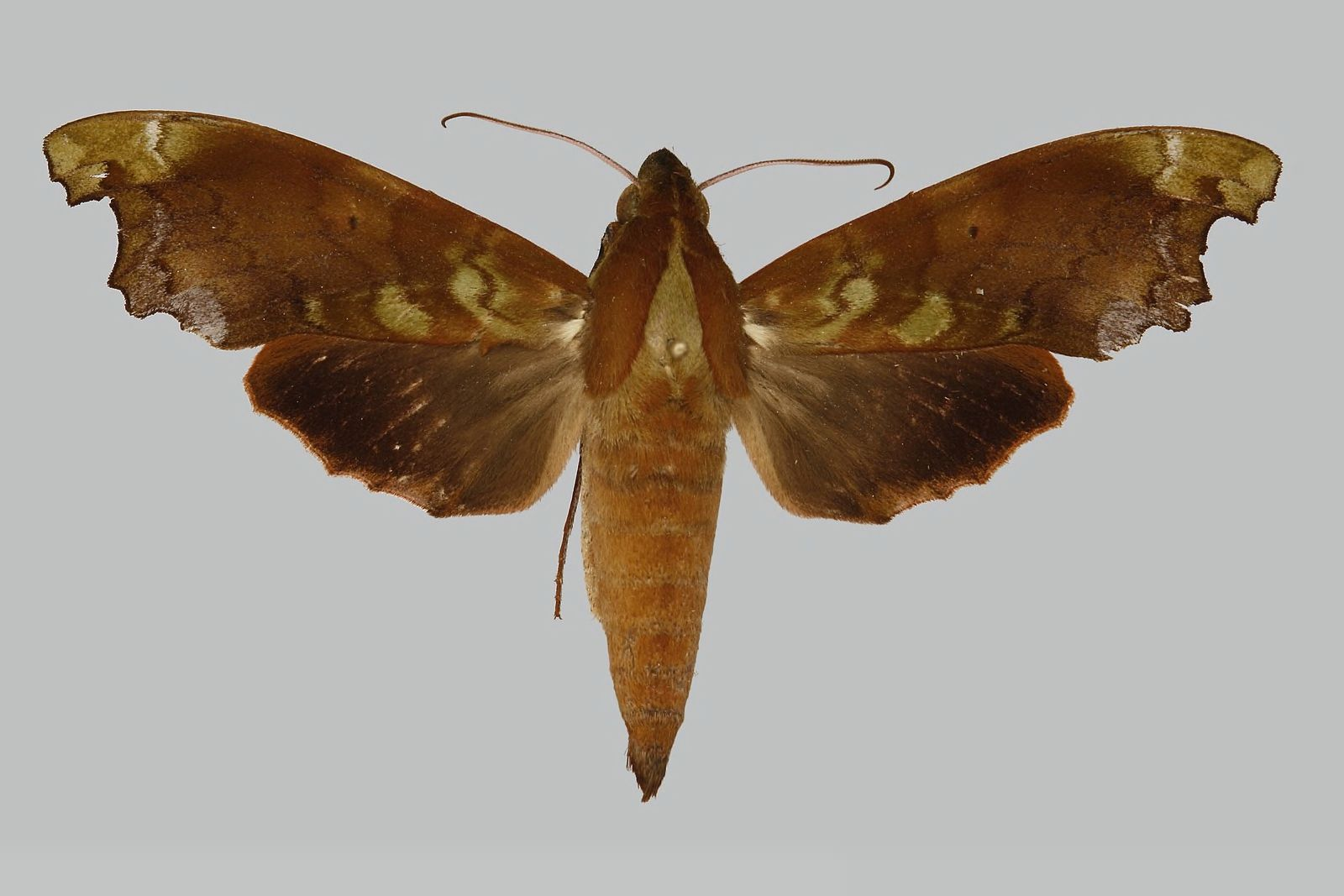
- Upper side view of a male Stolidoptera cadioui

Scientific classification
- Domain: Eukaryota
- Kingdom: Animalia
- Phylum: Arthropoda
- Class: Insecta
- Order: Lepidoptera
- Family: Sphingidae
- Genus: Stolidoptera
- Species: S. cadioui

Binomial name
- Stolidoptera cadioui Haxaire, 1997

= Stolidoptera cadioui =

Species of moth

Stolidoptera cadioui is a moth of the family Sphingidae. It is known from occidental Ecuador.

It has a wingspan of about 86 mm.
