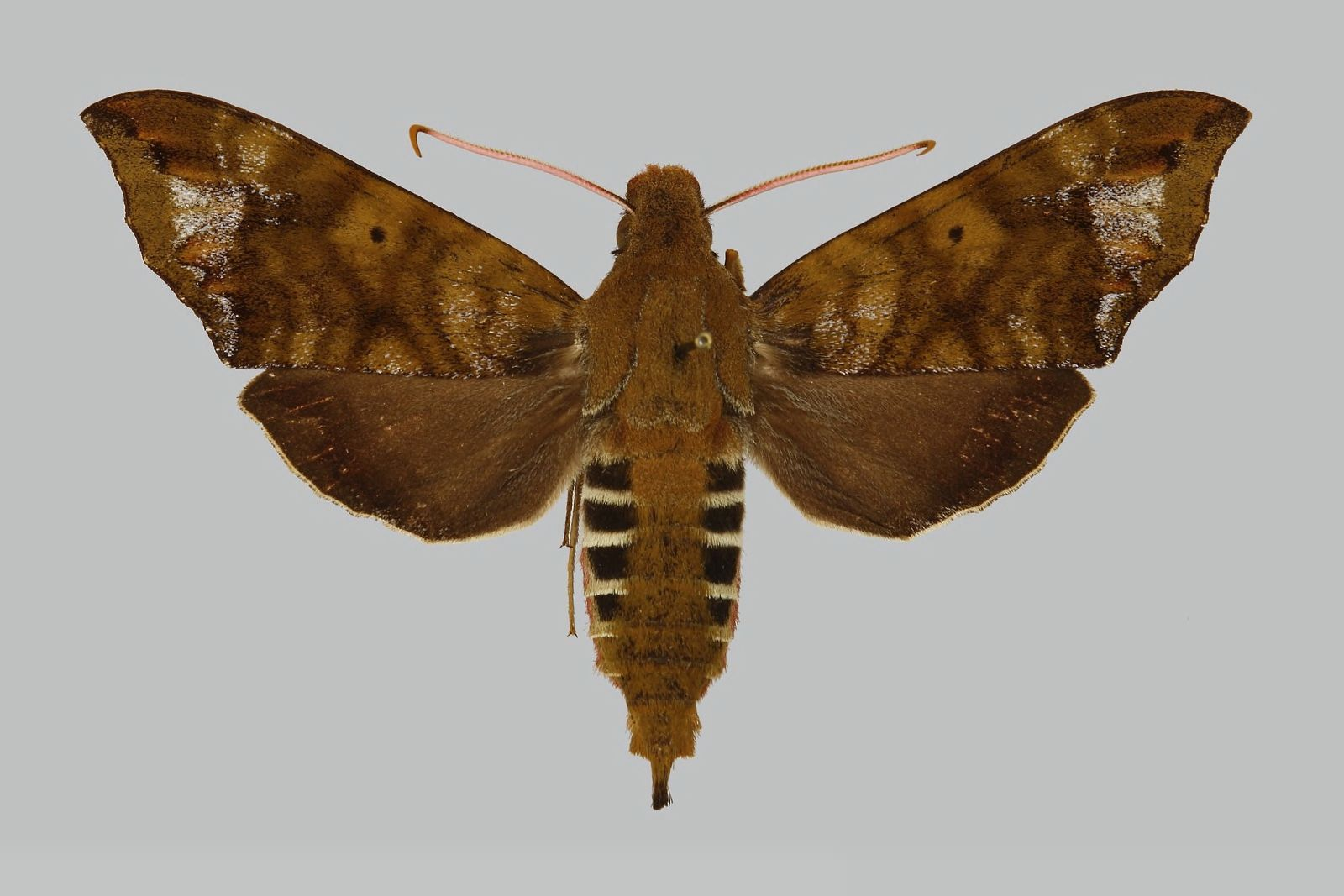

Scientific classification
- Domain: Eukaryota
- Kingdom: Animalia
- Phylum: Arthropoda
- Class: Insecta
- Order: Lepidoptera
- Family: Sphingidae
- Genus: Protaleuron
- Species: P. herbini

Binomial name
- Protaleuron herbini Haxaire, 2001

= Protaleuron herbini =

Species of moth

Protaleuron herbini is a moth of the family Sphingidae. It is known from Ecuador.
