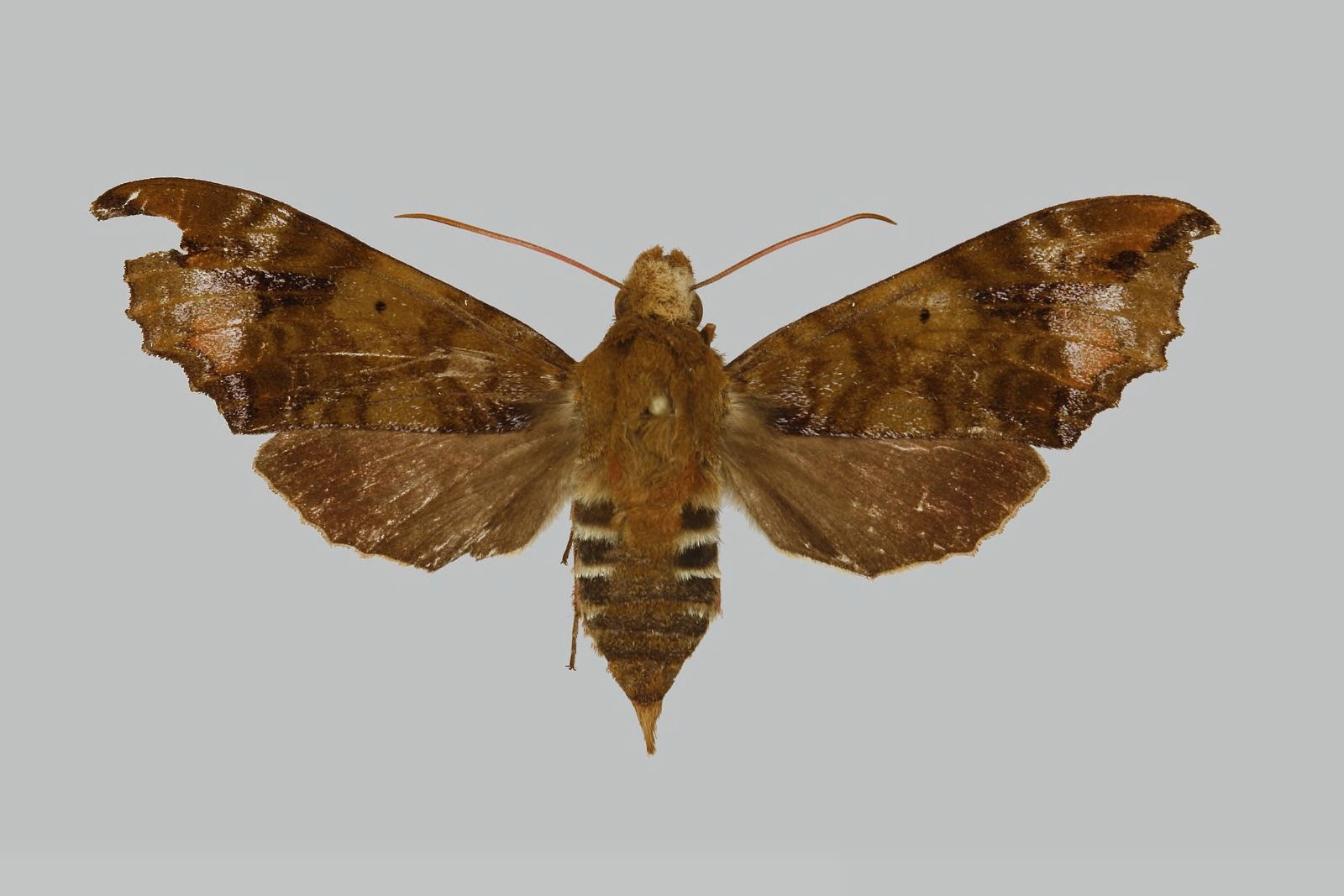

Scientific classification
- Domain: Eukaryota
- Kingdom: Animalia
- Phylum: Arthropoda
- Class: Insecta
- Order: Lepidoptera
- Family: Sphingidae
- Genus: Protaleuron
- Species: P. rhodogaster

Binomial name
- Protaleuron rhodogaster Rothschild & Jordan, 1903

= Protaleuron rhodogaster =

Species of moth

Protaleuron rhodogaster is a moth of the family Sphingidae. It is found from Ecuador to Bolivia.

The length of the forewings is 34 mm for males. The upperside of the body is greenish olive, the scaling of the antennae is pinkish buff and the uppersides of the legs are buff. The forewing upperside has three antemedian and three discal lines. The forewing underside is olive-brown in the basal two-thirds, washed with clay-colour. The discal area is crimson coral-red, with traces of lines. The hindwing underside is pinkish-crimson from the costal margin beyond the discal cell, while the anal area is olive clay-colour. Females are similar to males, but have broader forewings and a more contrasting pattern, with a conspicuous pale buff patch on the outer margin.
