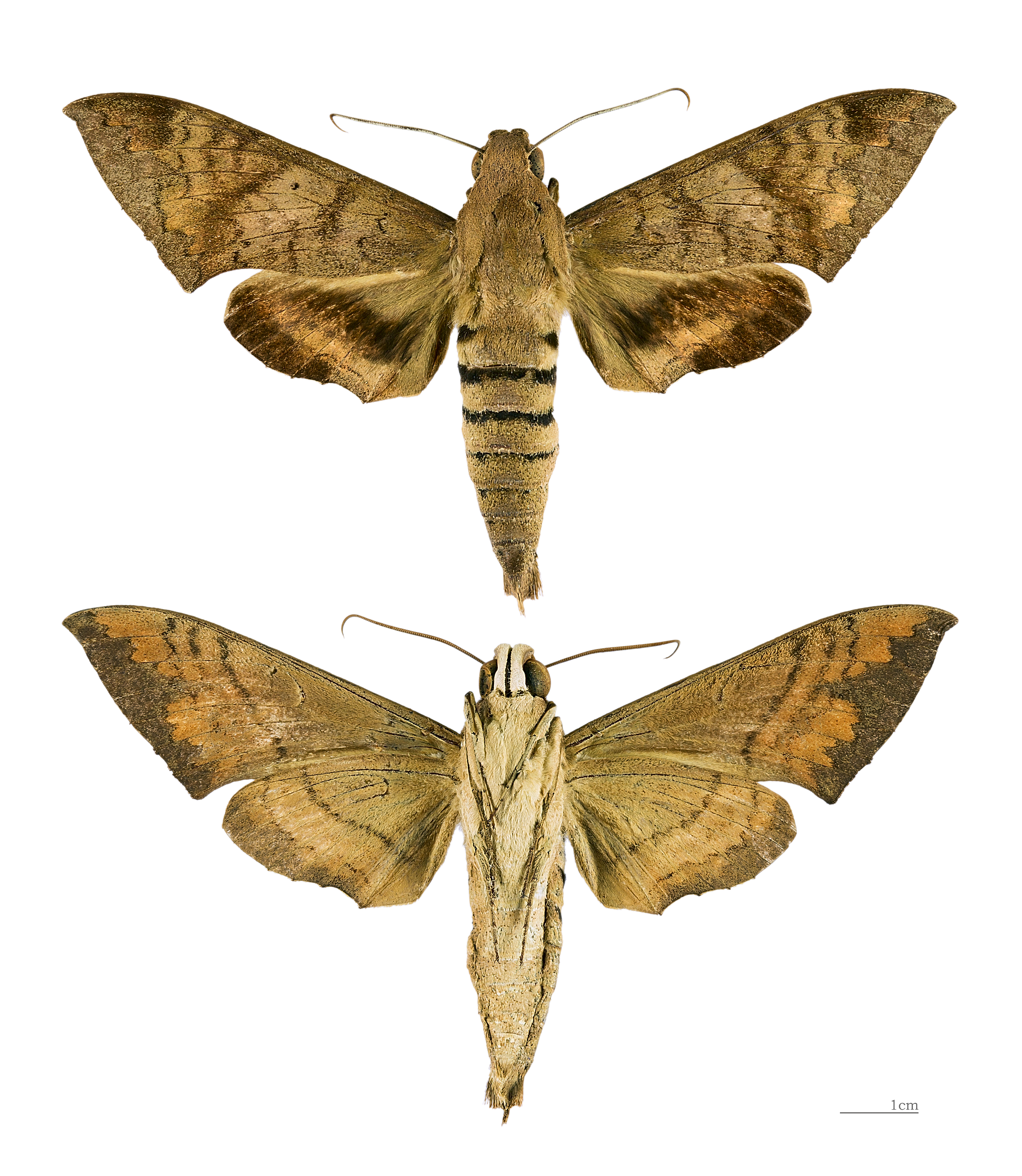

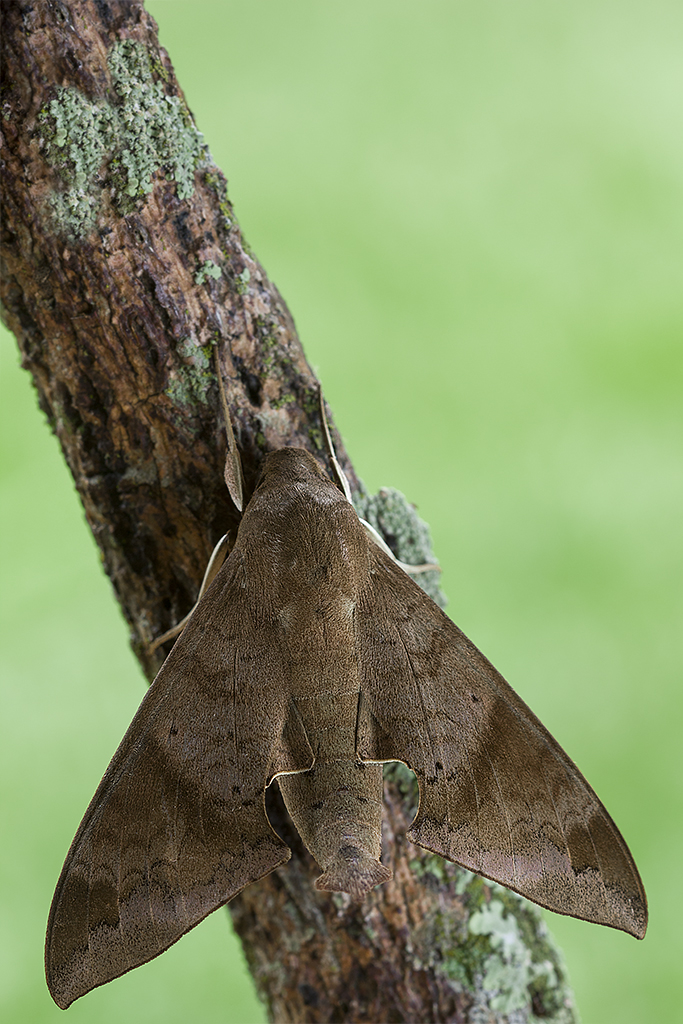

Scientific classification
- Kingdom: Animalia
- Phylum: Arthropoda
- Clade: Pancrustacea
- Class: Insecta
- Order: Lepidoptera
- Family: Sphingidae
- Subtribe: Dilophonotina
- Genus: Pachylioides; Hodges, 1971
- Species: P. resumens

Binomial name
- Pachylioides resumens (Walker, 1856)

Synonyms
- Pachylia resumens Walker, 1856; Chaerocampa versuta Clemens, 1859; Pachylia inconspicua Walker, 1856; Pachylia tristis Boisduval, 1875

= Pachylioides =

Genus of moths

Pachylioides is a monotypic genus of moths in the family Sphingidae erected by Ronald W. Hodges in 1971. Its only species, Pachylioides resumens, was first described by Francis Walker in 1856.

== Distribution ==
It is found from Argentina, Brazil, Bolivia and Paraguay north through Central America (including Panama, Costa Rica and Mexico) and the West Indies.

== Biology ==
Adults are on wing in several generations in the tropics.

The larvae feed on Echites umbellata, Ficus carica and other Ficus species.

== Gallery ==
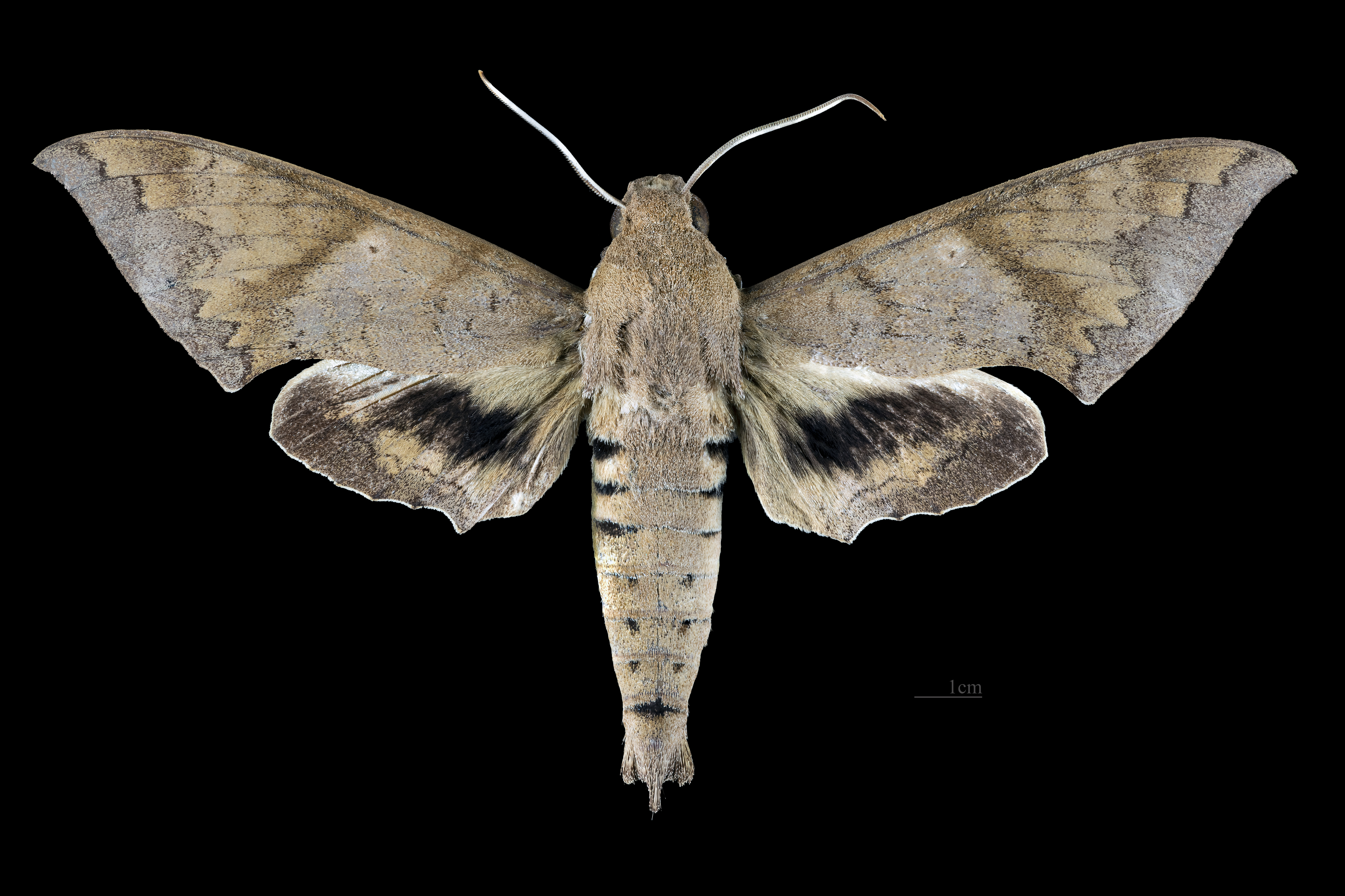
Male dorsal view

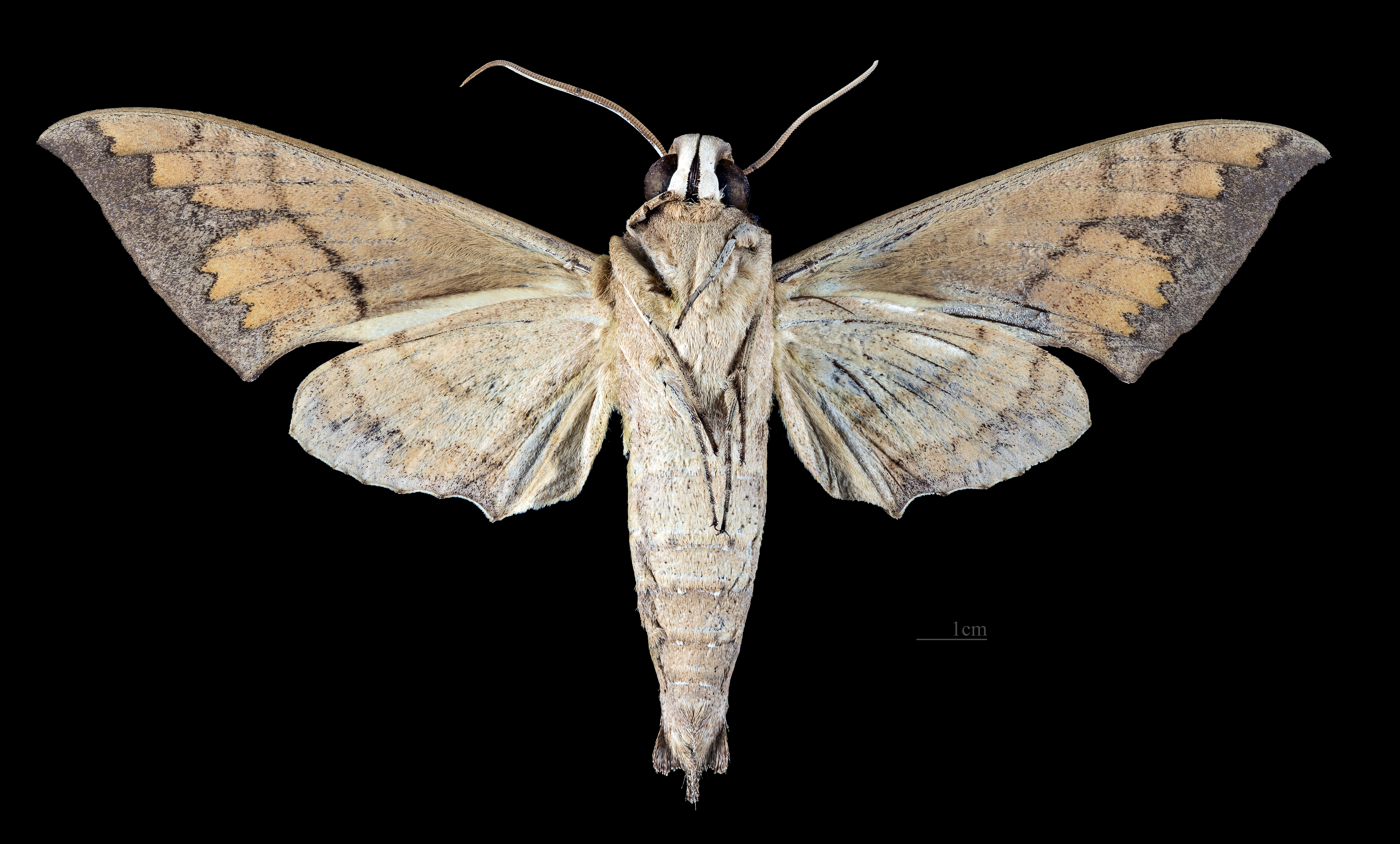
Male ventral view

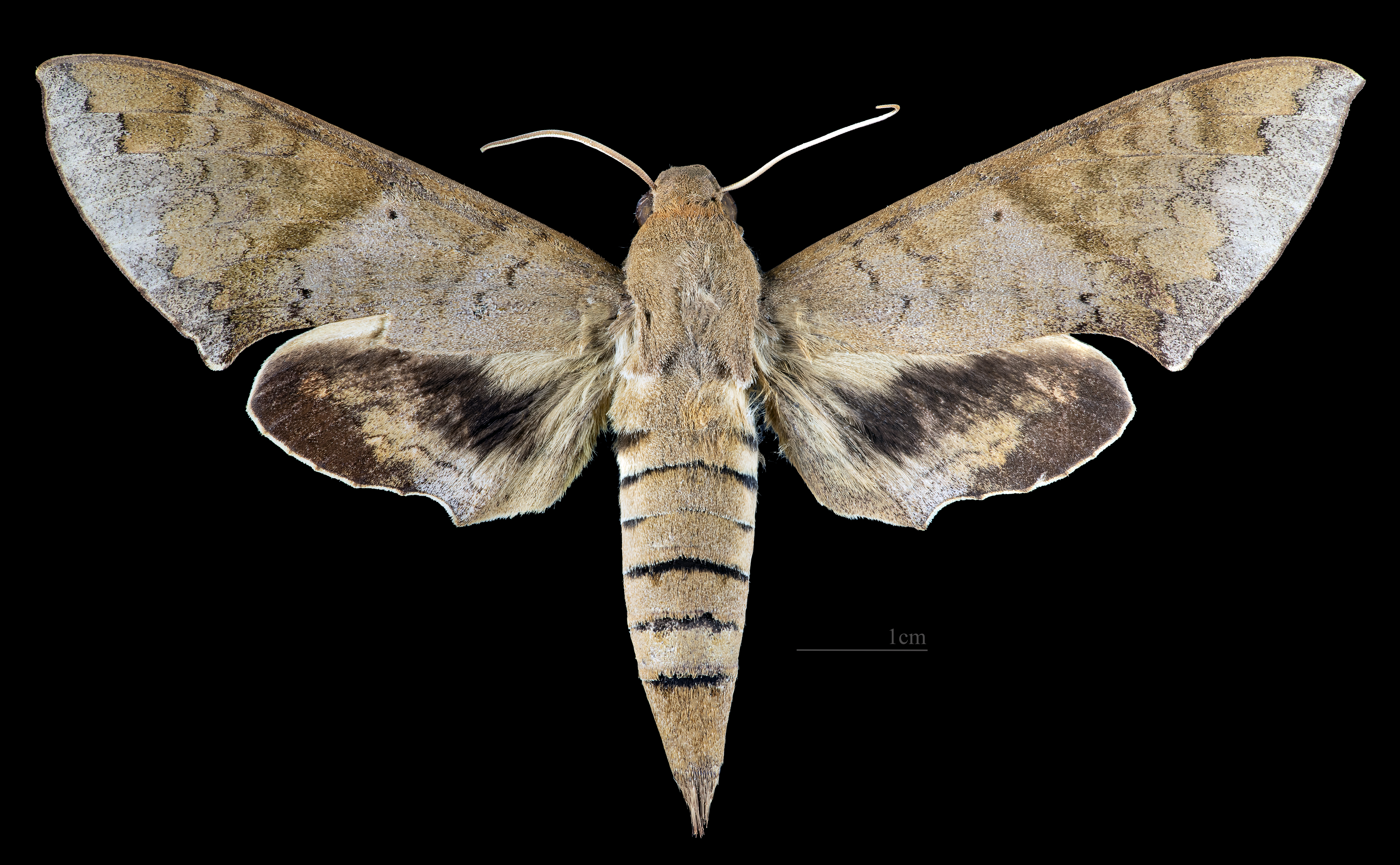
Female dorsal view

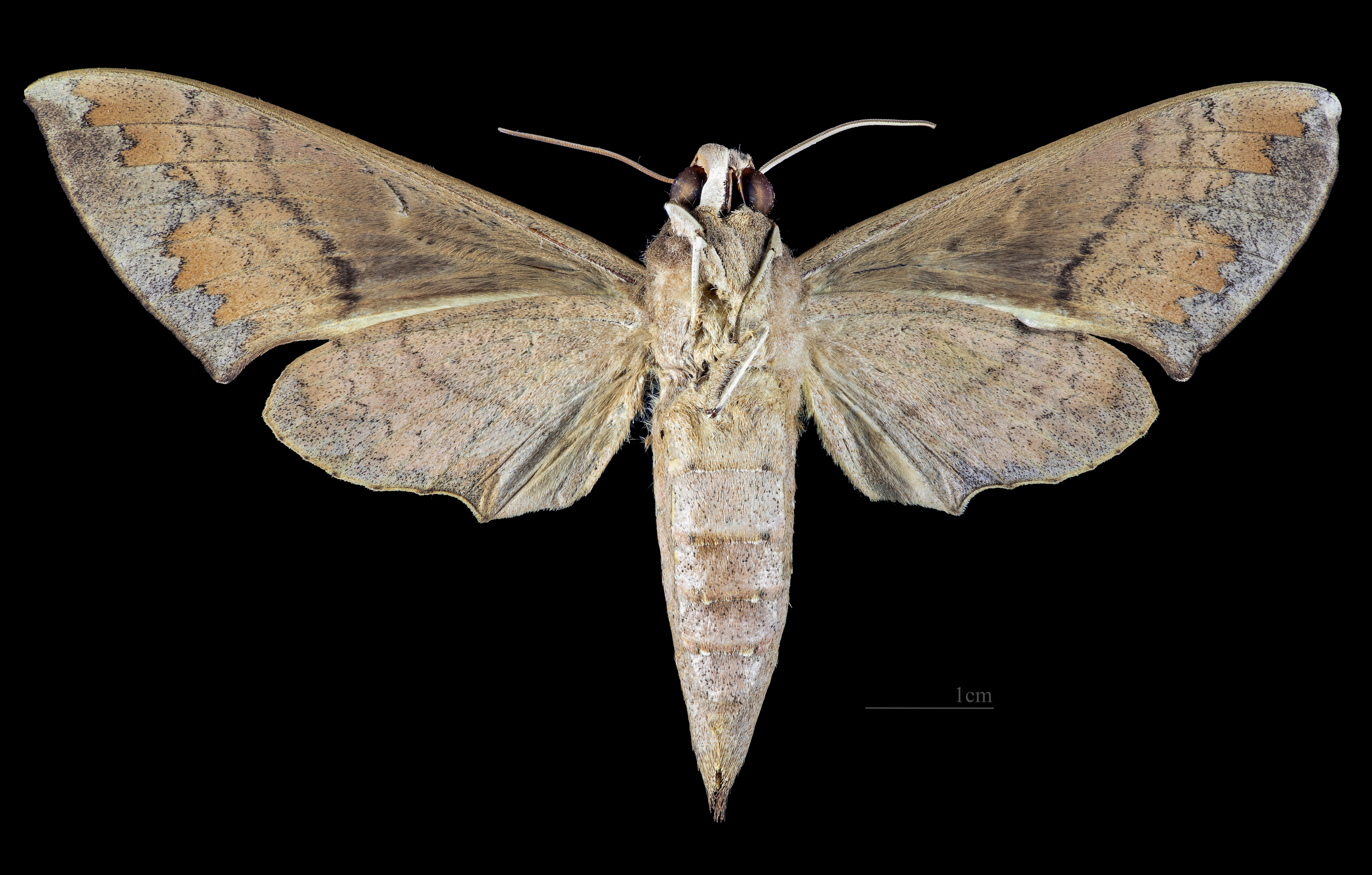
Female ventral view
