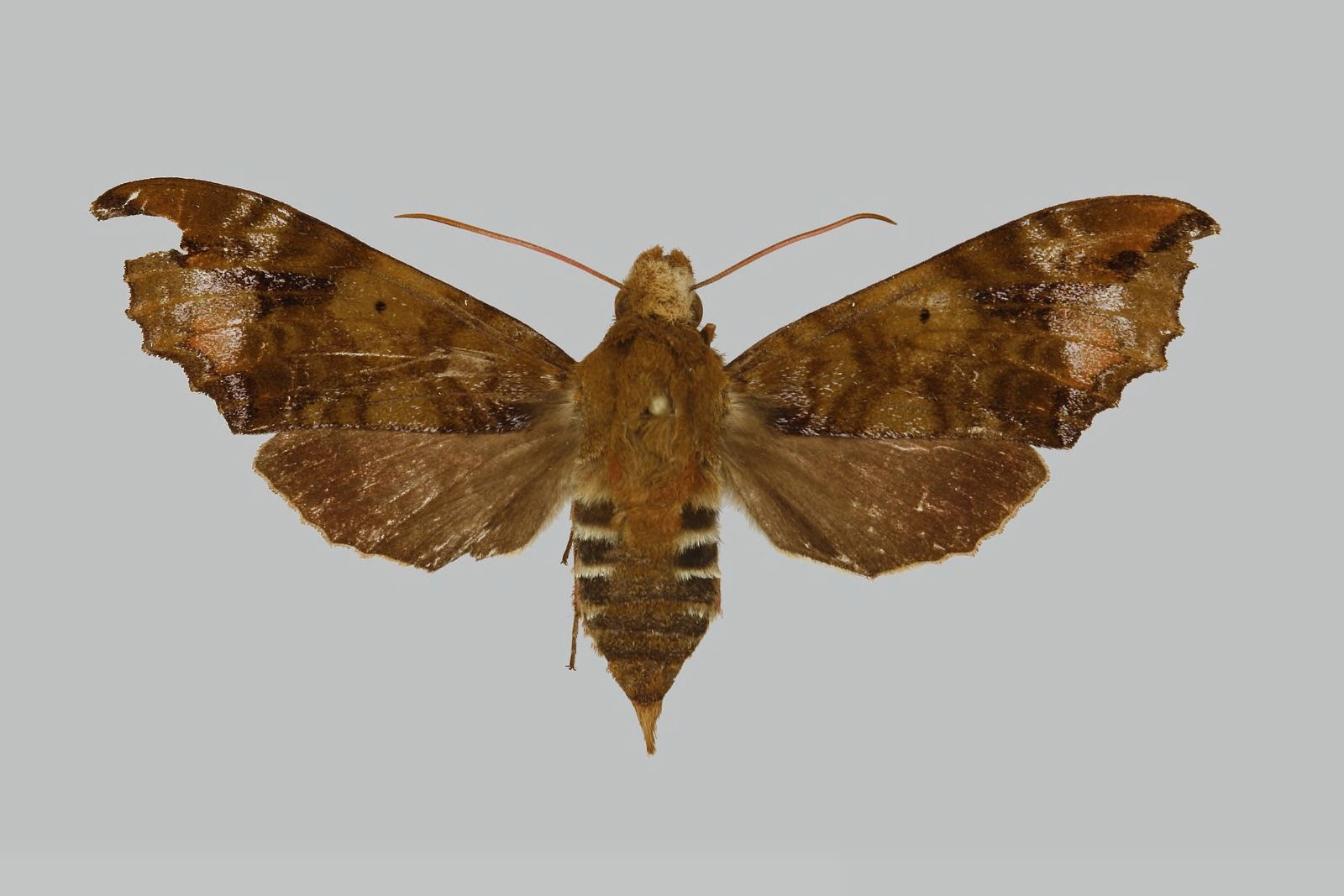
- Protaleuron rhodogaster

Scientific classification
- Kingdom: Animalia
- Phylum: Arthropoda
- Class: Insecta
- Order: Lepidoptera
- Family: Sphingidae
- Subtribe: Dilophonotina
- Genus: Protaleuron; Rothschild & Jordan, 1903

Species
- See text

= Protaleuron =

Genus of moths

Protaleuron is a genus of moths in the family Sphingidae.

== Species ==
- Protaleuron herbini Haxaire, 2001
- Protaleuron maxi Haxaire & Melichar, 2022
- Protaleuron rhodogaster Rothschild & Jordan 1903
