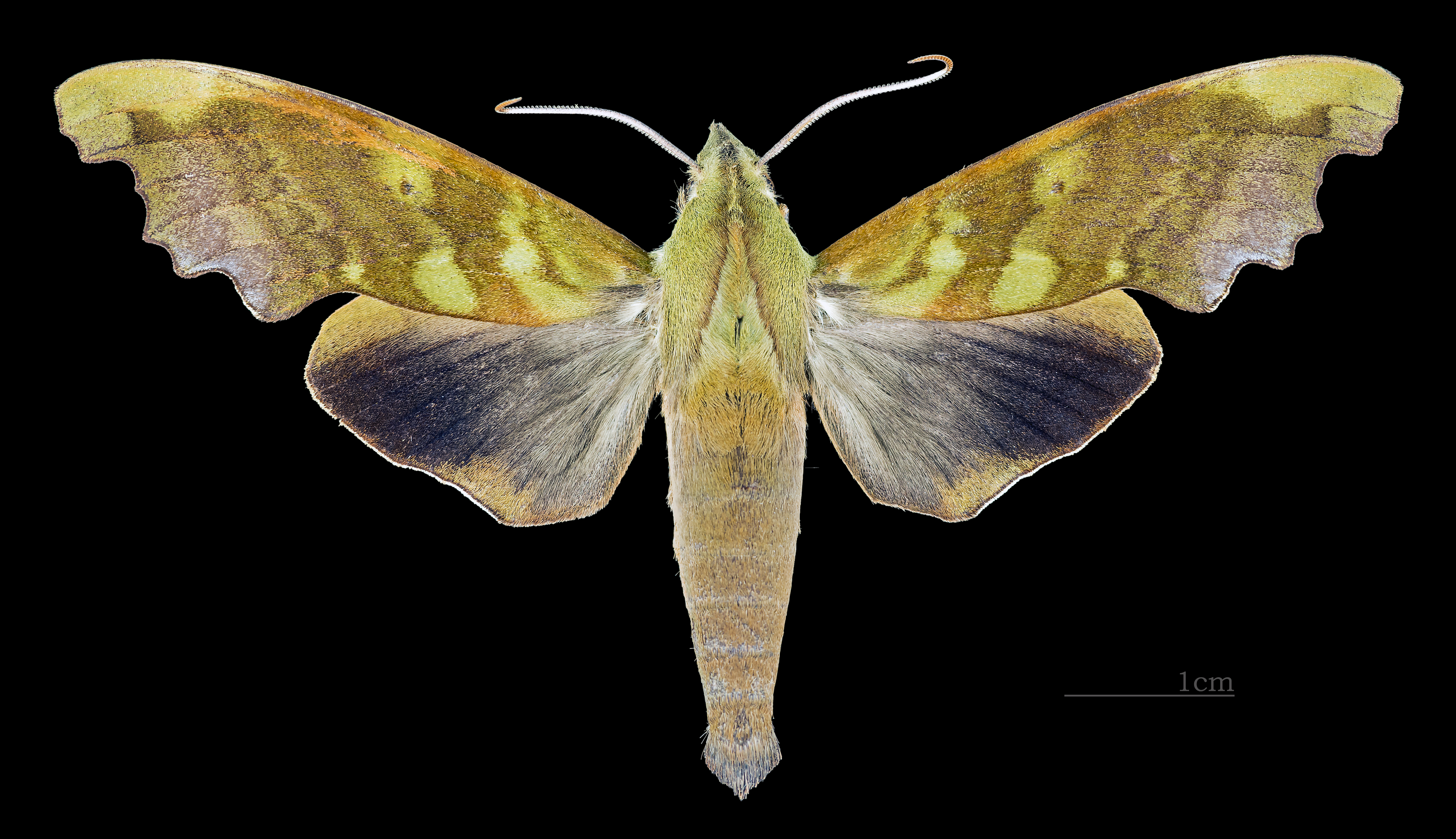

Scientific classification
- Domain: Eukaryota
- Kingdom: Animalia
- Phylum: Arthropoda
- Class: Insecta
- Order: Lepidoptera
- Family: Sphingidae
- Subtribe: Dilophonotina
- Genus: Stolidoptera; Rothschild & Jordan, 1903

= Stolidoptera =

Genus of moths

Stolidoptera is a genus of moths in the family Sphingidae. The genus was discovered by Walter Rothschild and Karl Jordan in 1903.

== Species ==
- Stolidoptera cadioui Haxaire, 1997
- Stolidoptera tachasara (H. Druce, 1888)
