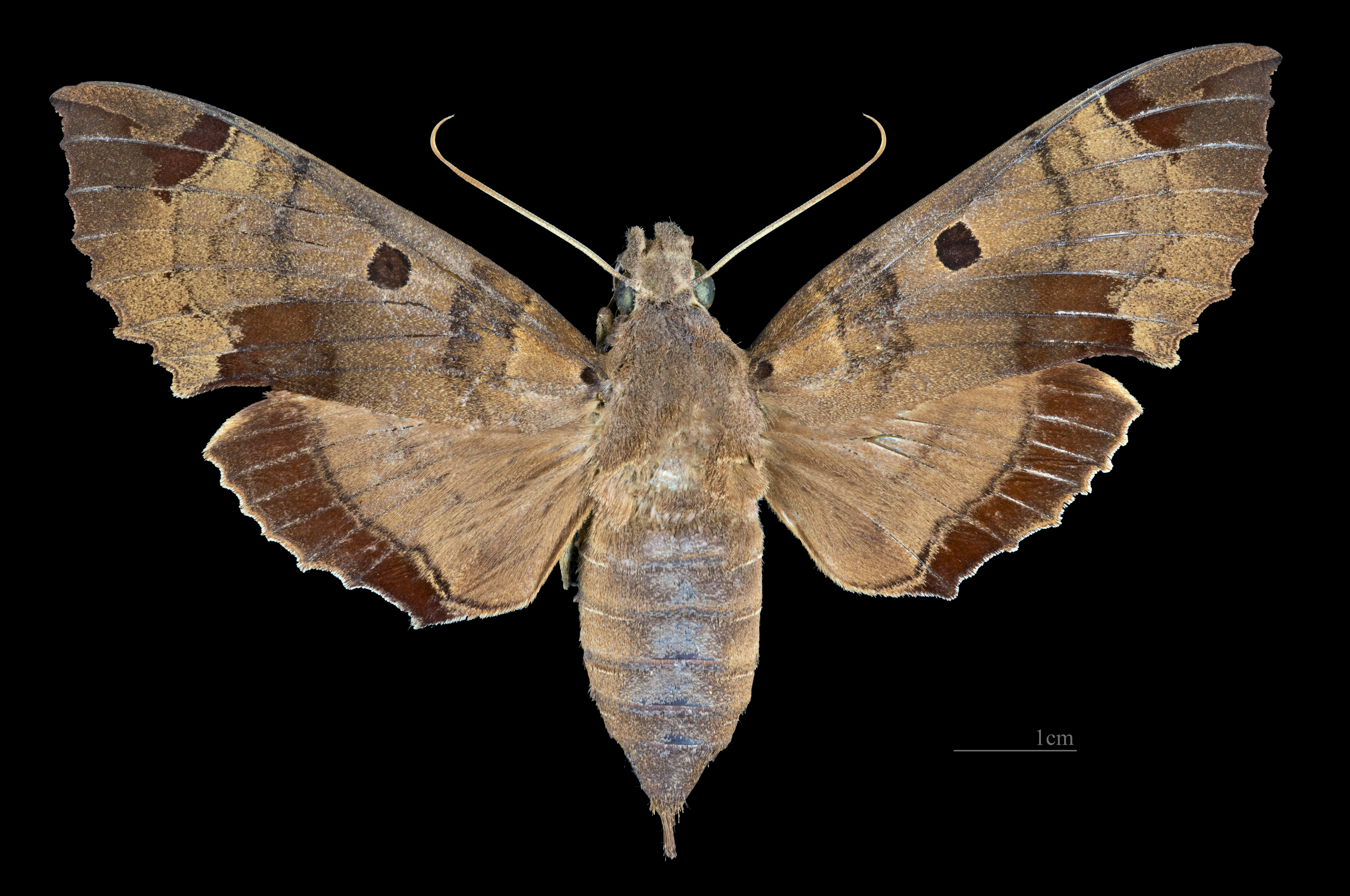
- Female dorsal
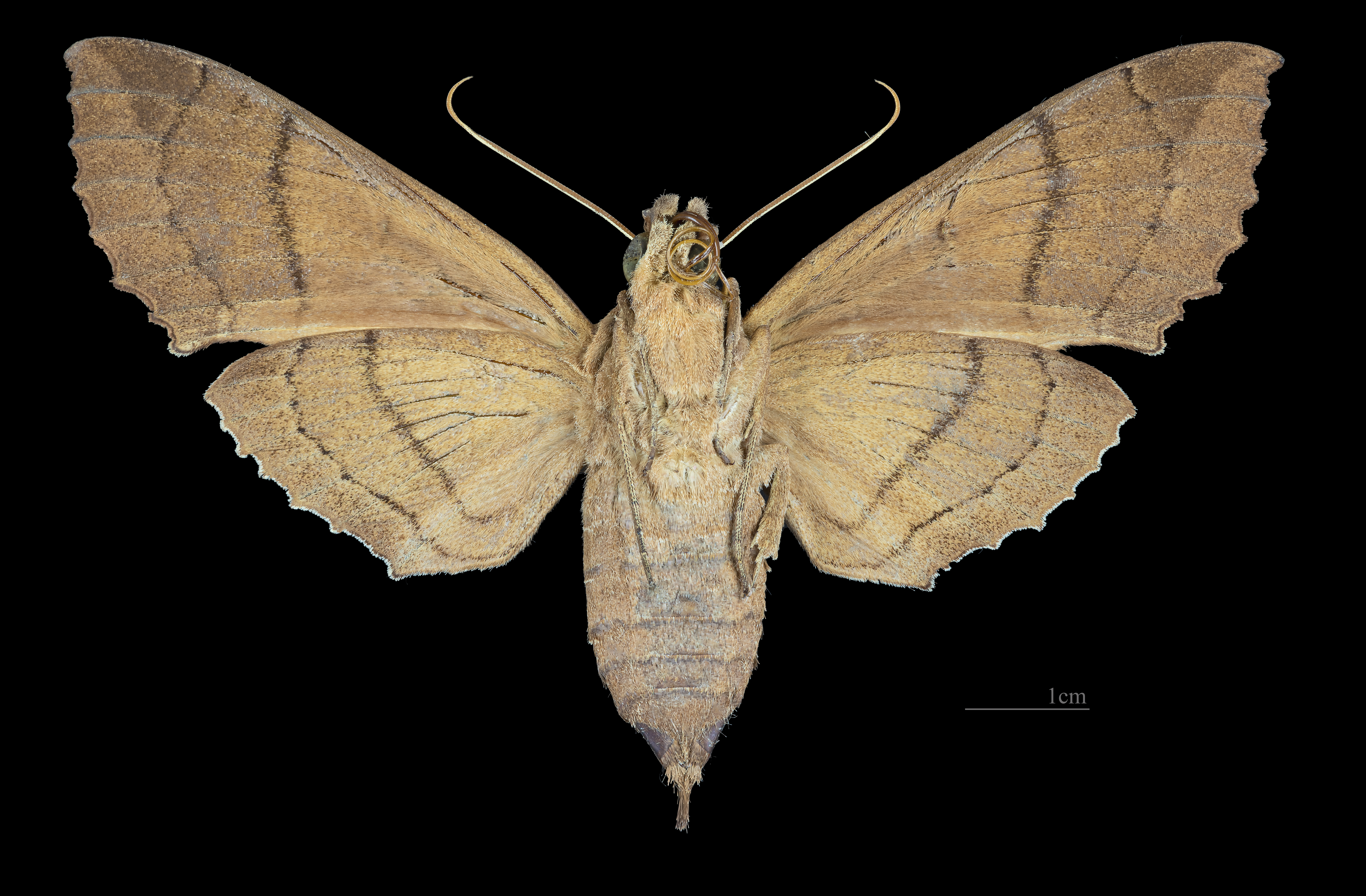
- Female ventral

Scientific classification
- Domain: Eukaryota
- Kingdom: Animalia
- Phylum: Arthropoda
- Class: Insecta
- Order: Lepidoptera
- Family: Sphingidae
- Subtribe: Dilophonotina
- Genus: Kloneus; Skinner, 1923
- Species: K. babayaga

Binomial name
- Kloneus babayaga Skinner, 1923

Synonyms
- Oberthuerion Clark, 1923 (Genus); Oberthuerion harroverii Clark, 1923 (Species)

= Kloneus =

Genus of moths

Kloneus is a genus of moths in the family Sphingidae, containing only one species, Kloneus babayaga, which is known from Nicaragua but probably ranges from Mexico to Costa Rica.

Adults are similar to Pachylia ficus but can be distinguished by the strongly crenulated outer forewing margin, the very large discal spot on the forewing upperside and the inconspicuous median band on the hindwing upperside. The lower three-quarters of the hindwing upperside are pale brown with a slightly darker median band. The marginal band is dark brown, with a very narrow dark brown postmedian line running along just basal to its inner edge. Adults are probably on wing year round.
