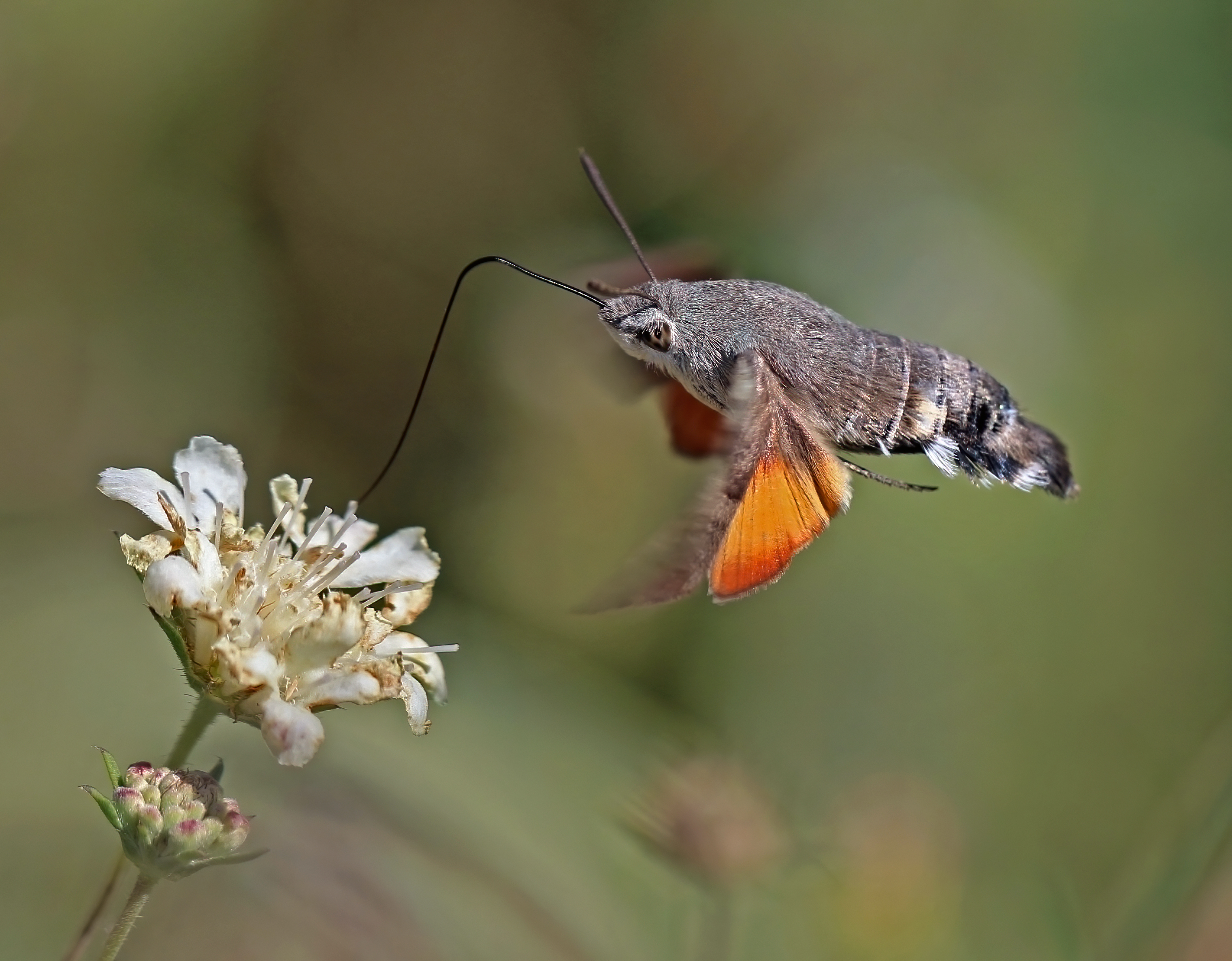
- Hummingbird hawk moth Macroglossum stellatarum

Scientific classification
- Domain: Eukaryota
- Kingdom: Animalia
- Phylum: Arthropoda
- Class: Insecta
- Order: Lepidoptera
- Family: Sphingidae
- Subfamily: Macroglossinae; Harris, 1839

Type species
- Macroglossum stellatarum Linnaeus, 1758

Diversity
- 86 genera, roughly 733 species

= Macroglossinae (moth) =

Subfamily of moths

The Macroglossinae are a subfamily of Sphingidae moths in the order Lepidoptera. The subfamily is divided into three tribes: Dilophonotini, Macroglossini and Philampelini.
