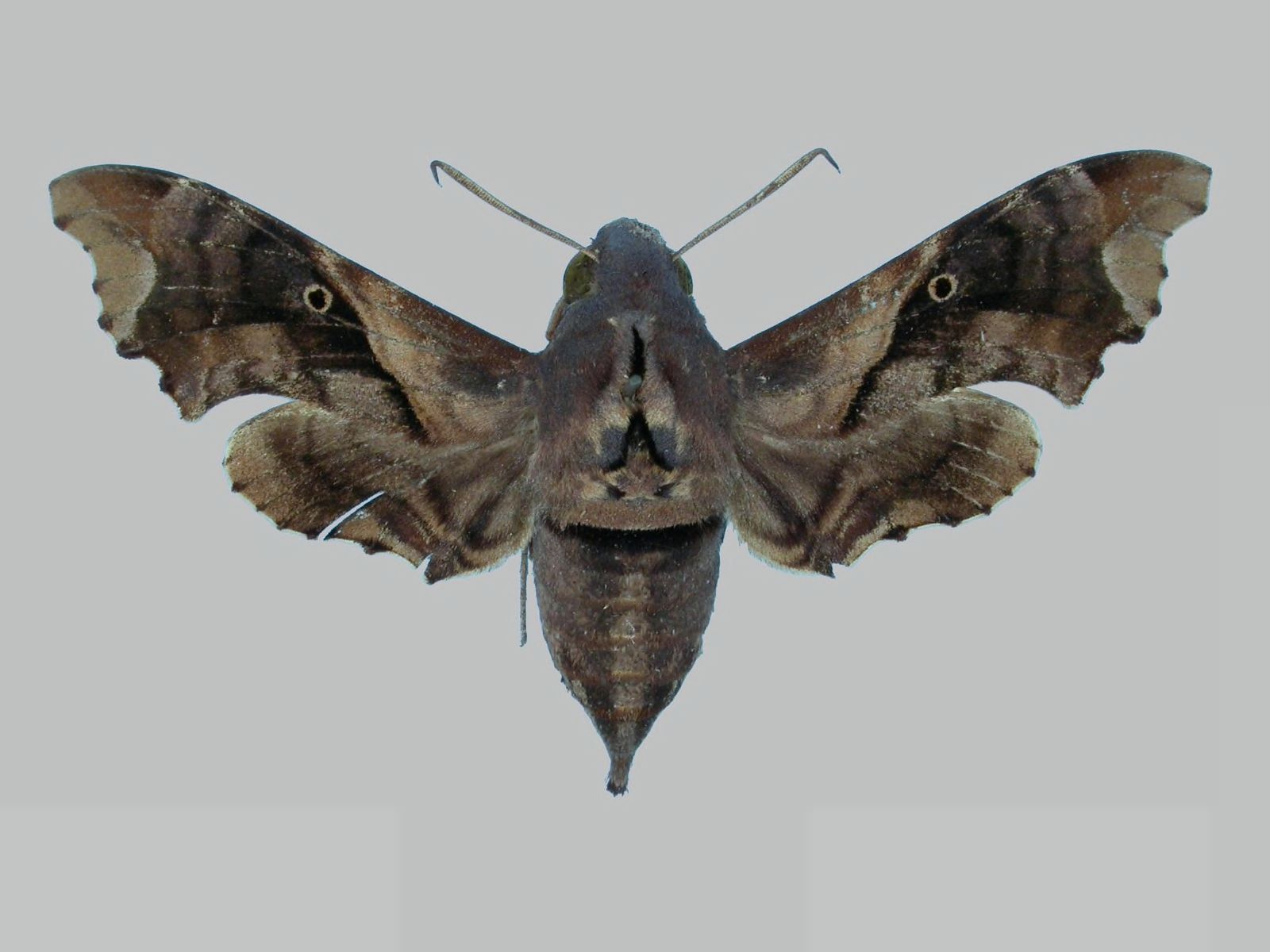
- Female specimen of Enyo boisduvali

Scientific classification
- Kingdom: Animalia
- Phylum: Arthropoda
- Class: Insecta
- Order: Lepidoptera
- Family: Sphingidae
- Genus: Enyo
- Species: E. boisduvali

Binomial name
- Enyo boisduvali (Oberthur, 1904)

Synonyms
- Epistor boisduvali Oberthür, 1904

= Enyo boisduvali =

Species of moth

Enyo boisduvali is a moth of the family Sphingidae. It is known from Cuba.

It is similar to Enyo lugubris lugubris, but can be distinguished by the well-developed, strongly dentate postmedian lines on the undersides of both wings. Furthermore, the centre of the thorax is paler grey than the tegulae and it contains a dark brown or black median inverted Y-shaped mark. The postmedian area of the forewing upperside is dark with orange highlights. There are three well-developed transverse postmedian lines on both the forewing and hindwing underside.

There are probably two to three generations per year.
