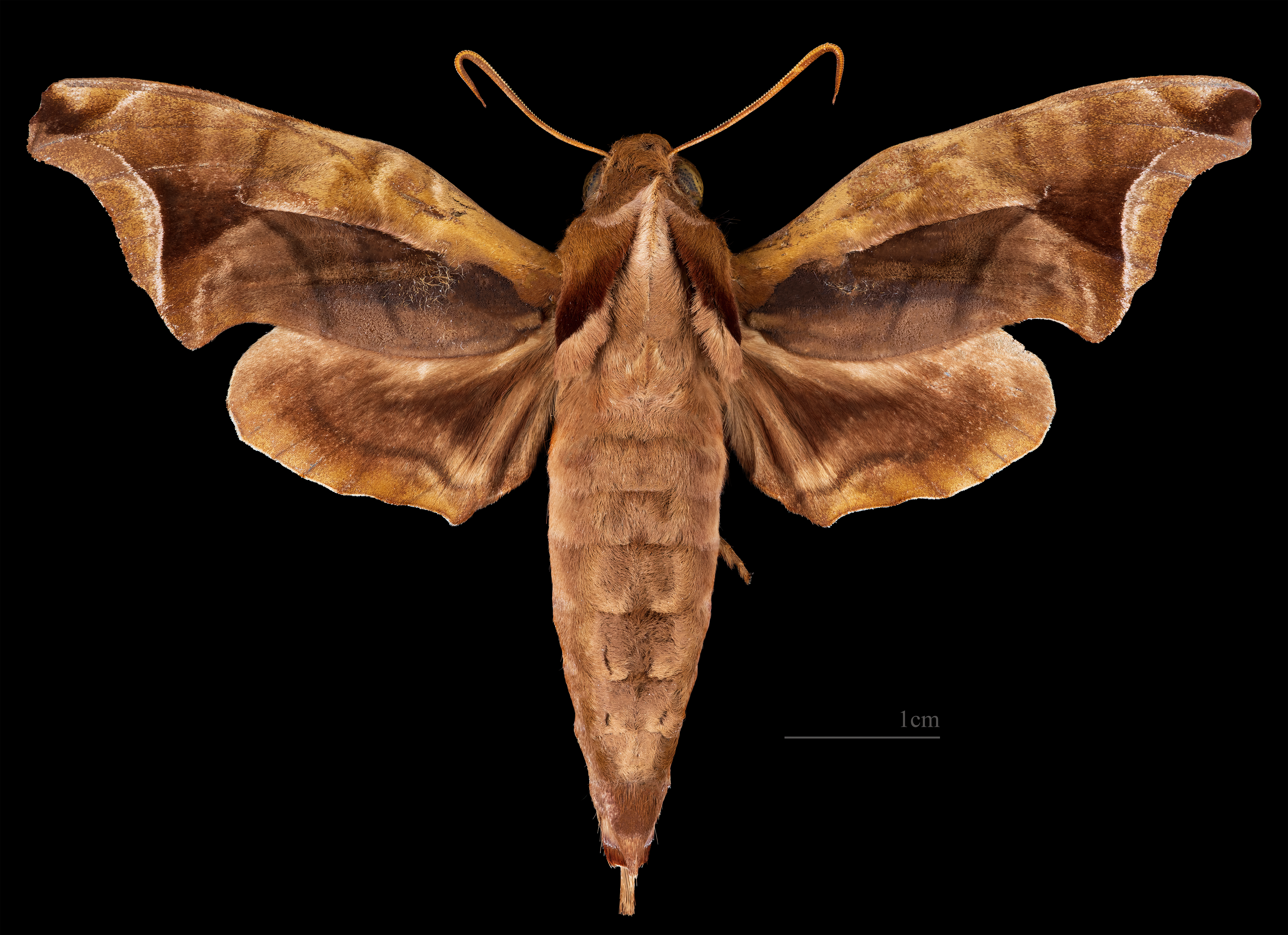
- Enyo gorgon ♂
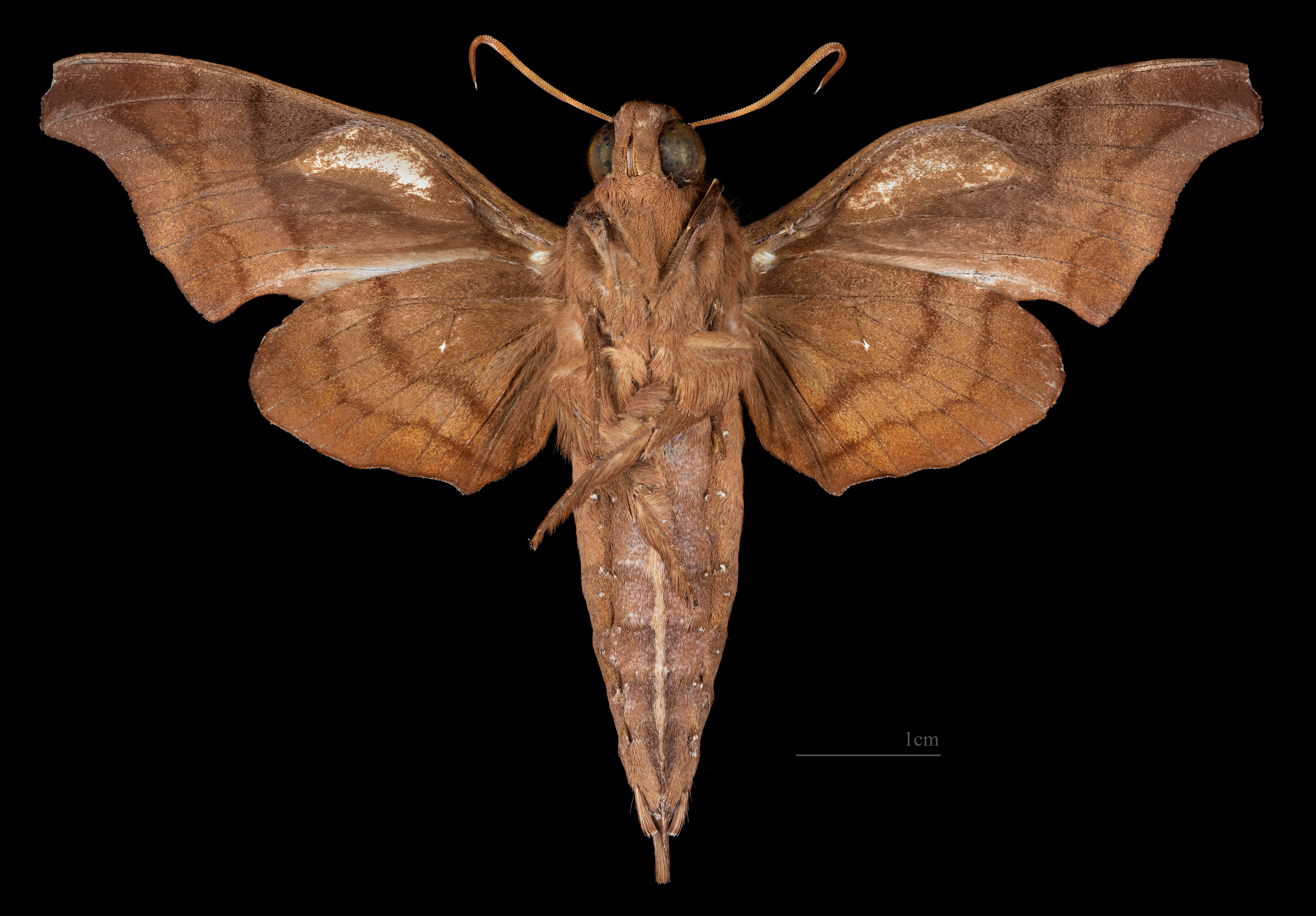
- Enyo gorgon ♂ △

Scientific classification
- Domain: Eukaryota
- Kingdom: Animalia
- Phylum: Arthropoda
- Class: Insecta
- Order: Lepidoptera
- Family: Sphingidae
- Genus: Enyo
- Species: E. gorgon

Binomial name
- Enyo gorgon (Cramer, 1777)

Synonyms
- Sphinx gorgon Cramer, 1777; Sphinx lyctus Cramer, 1779; Epistor gorgon heinrichi Clark, 1932

= Enyo gorgon =

Species of moth

Enyo gorgon is a moth of the family Sphingidae.

== Distribution ==
It is found from Mexico to the northern part of South America.

== Description ==
The wingspan is 66–72 mm. There are probably two to three generations per year. Adults are on from May to June, August to September and from December to January in Costa Rica. In Bolivia, adults have been recorded from October to November. It has been recorded in August in Mato Grosso in Brazil and in February in Peru.

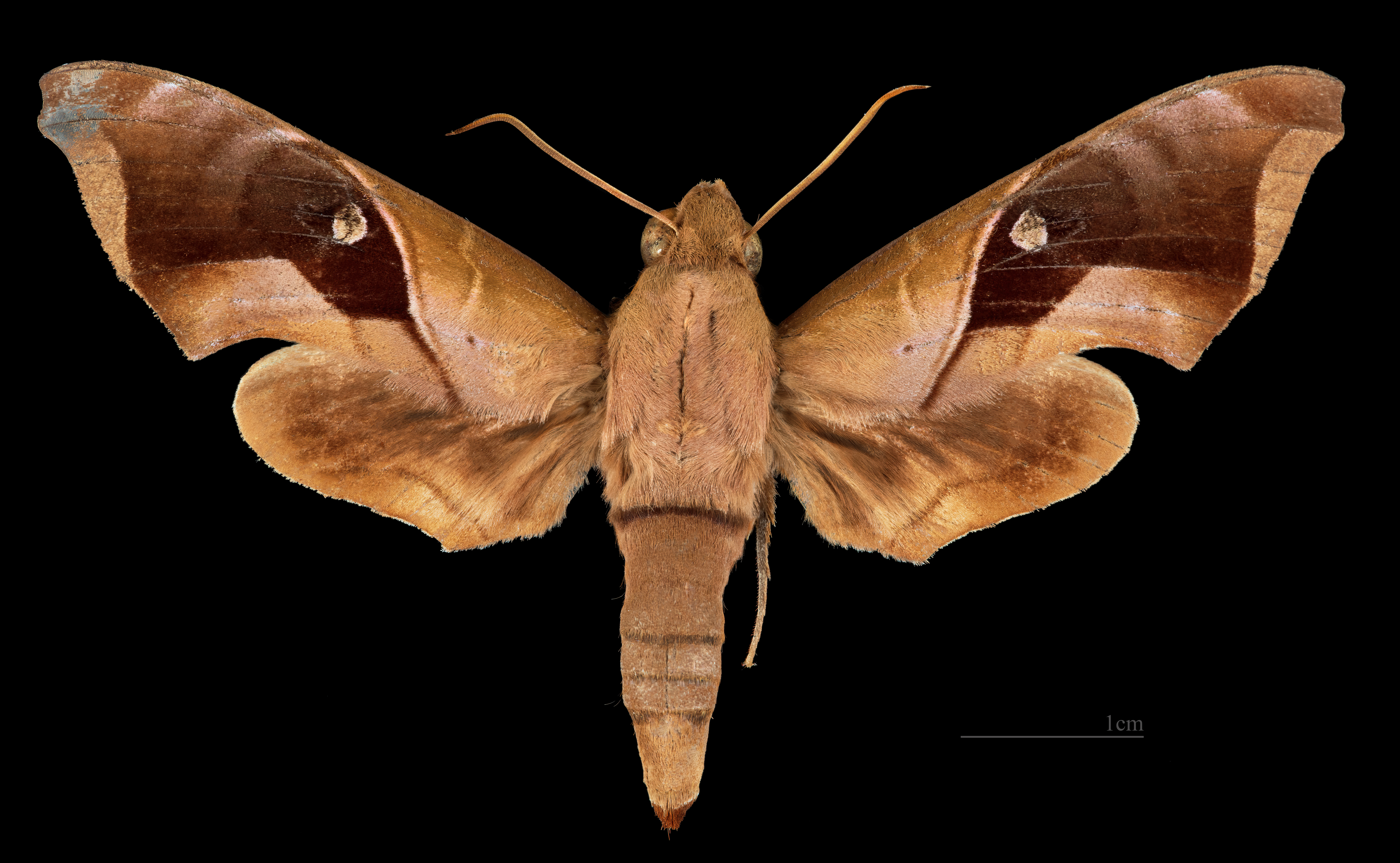
♀ Dorsal side

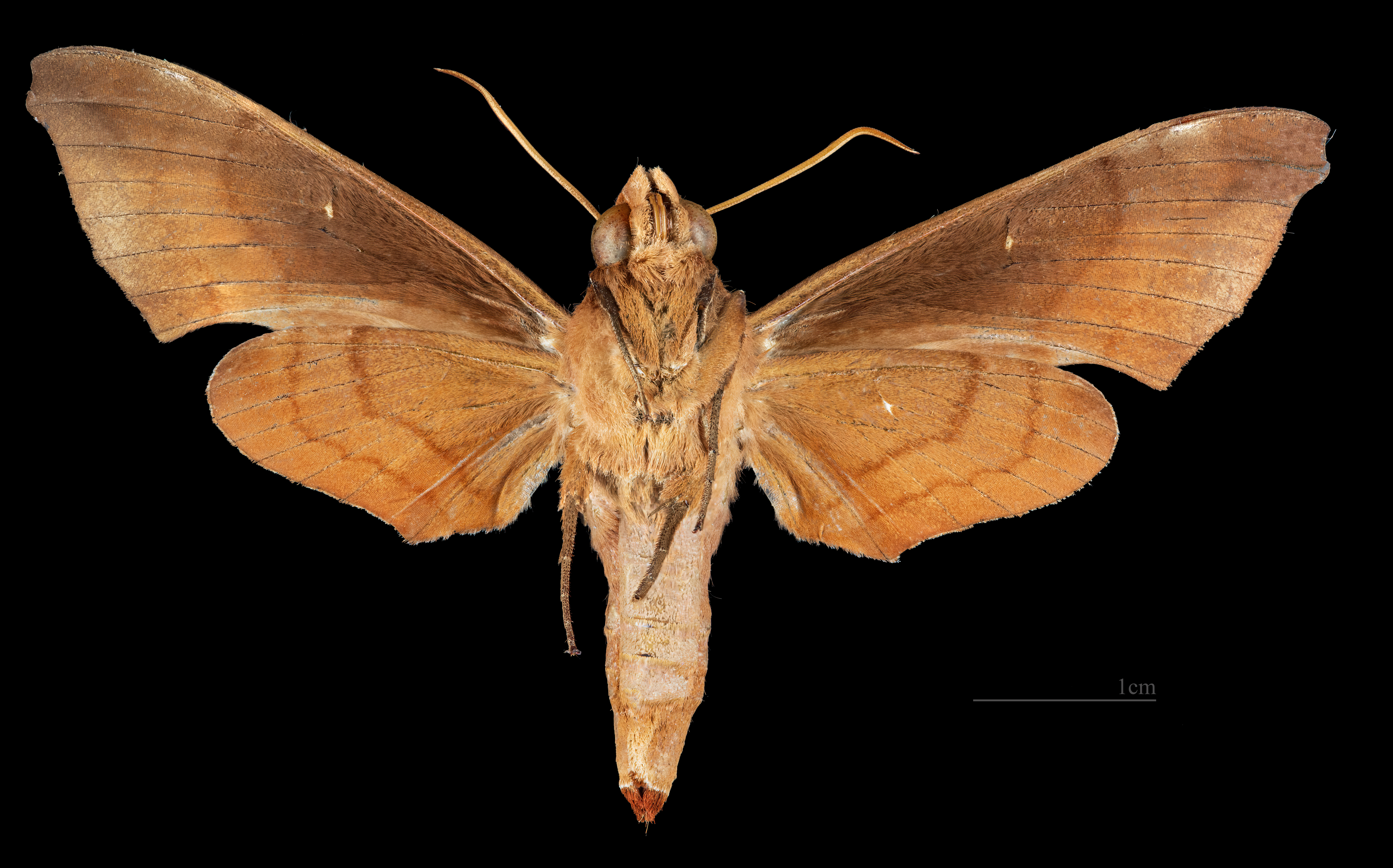
♀ △ Ventral side

== biology ==
The larvae feed on Vitaceae species, including Vitis tiliifolia, as well Tetracera volubilis of the family Dilleniaceae.
