= Enyo (disambiguation) =

In Greek mythology,

- Enyo is a war goddess (Ἐνυώ)
- Enyo, one of the Graeae, also called the Grey Sisters or the Phorcides ("daughters of Phorcys")

Enyo may also refer to:

- Enyo (moth), a genus of moths
- Enyo Krastovchev (born 1984), a Bulgarian footballer
- Enyo (software), a JavaScript framework

== See also ==
- Tettey-Enyo
