= Water vine =

The name water vine may refer to at least two plants, both in the Vitaceae (grape) family:

- Cissus hypoglauca, a common Australian vine
- Vitis tiliifolia, a vine of the Americas
