= Enyo cavifer =

- Enyo cavifer ♂
- Enyo cavifer ♂ △

Scientific classification
- Kingdom: Animalia
- Phylum: Arthropoda
- Class: Insecta
- Order: Lepidoptera
- Family: Sphingidae
- Genus: Enyo
- Species: E. cavifer

Binomial name
- Enyo cavifer (Rothschild & Jordan, 1903)

Synonyms
- Epistor cavifer Rothschild & Jordan, 1903; Thyreus maris Herrich-Schäffer, 1854; Enyo cavifer paganus (Kernbach, 1957)

Species of moth

Enyo cavifer is a species of moth in the family Sphingidae. It was described by Rothschild and Jordan, in 1903.

== Distribution ==
It is found from Central America (including Mexico and Belize south) to Guatemala, Costa Rica, Venezuela, French Guiana, Brazil, Peru, Bolivia and Colombia.

== Description ==
The wingspan is 60–62 mm.

Enyo cavifer ♀

Enyo cavifer ♀ △

== Biology ==
Adults are probably on wing in two to three generations per year. They have been recorded from May to June, August to September and from December to January in Costa Rica, in February in French Guiana and in January in Peru.

The larvae feed on Cissus aff. biformifolia, Vitis tiliifolia and other Vitaceae species.
