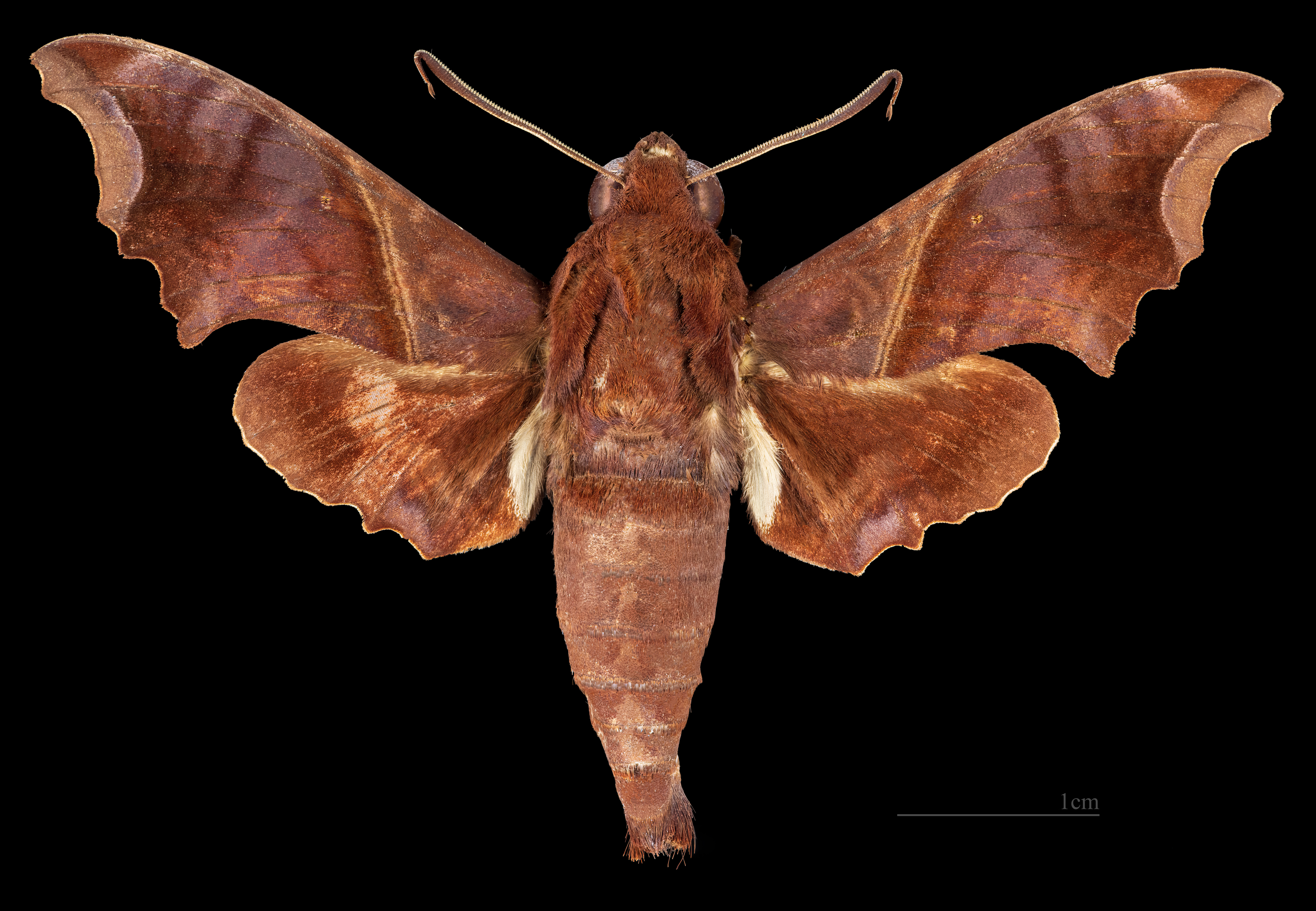
- Enyo ocypete ♂
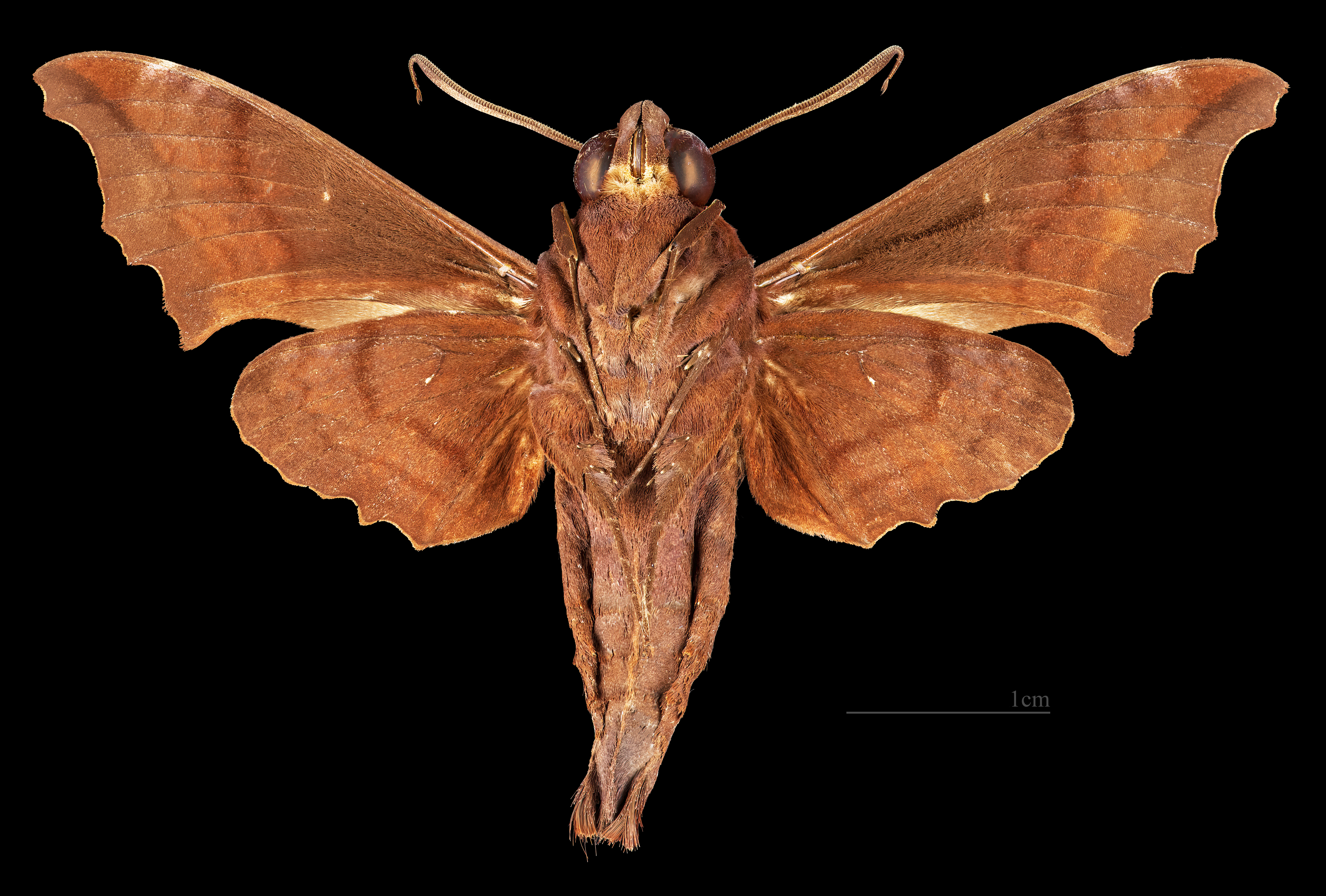
- Enyo ocypete ♂ △

Scientific classification
- Kingdom: Animalia
- Phylum: Arthropoda
- Class: Insecta
- Order: Lepidoptera
- Family: Sphingidae
- Genus: Enyo
- Species: E. ocypete

Binomial name
- Enyo ocypete (Linnaeus, 1758)

Synonyms
- Sphinx ocypete Linnaeus, 1758; Sphinx camertus Cramer, 1779; Sphinx danum Cramer, 1779; Enyo ocypete rufa Raymundo da Silva, 1932

= Enyo ocypete =

Species of moth

Enyo ocypete is a moth of the family Sphingidae. The species was first described by Carl Linnaeus in his 1758 10th edition of Systema Naturae. It is found from the southern United States, through Central America to Venezuela, Brazil, Peru, Bolivia, Paraguay and northern Argentina.

The wingspan is 60 mm. Adults are on wing year round in the tropics, southern Florida and Louisiana. They are on wing from August to November in the northern part of the range.

The larvae probably feed on Caribbean grape (Vitis tiliifolia) and other Vitaceae and Dilleniaceae species, such as Vitis, Cissus rhombifolia and Ampelopsis, Tetracera volubilis, Curatella americana, Tetracera hydrophila and Doliocarpus multiflorus. Ludwigia of the family Onagraceae might also be a host plant.

Males of the Enyo ocypete exhibit a smaller wing size than females. The many reproductive flight advantages include the ability of males to fly faster and have better fitness for mating, while females possess slower flight which is used for selecting host plants and gathering resources.
