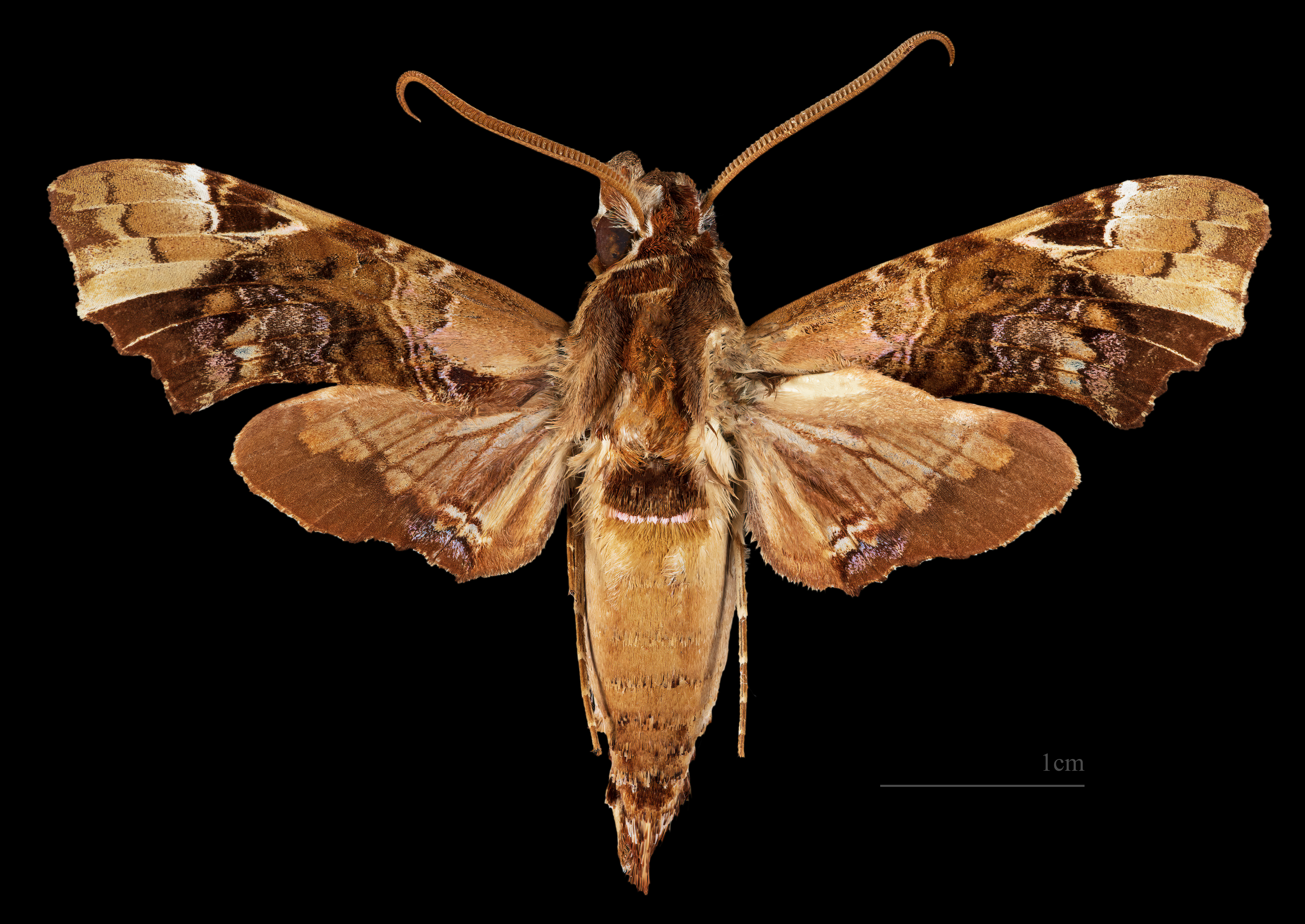
- Unzela pronoe ♂
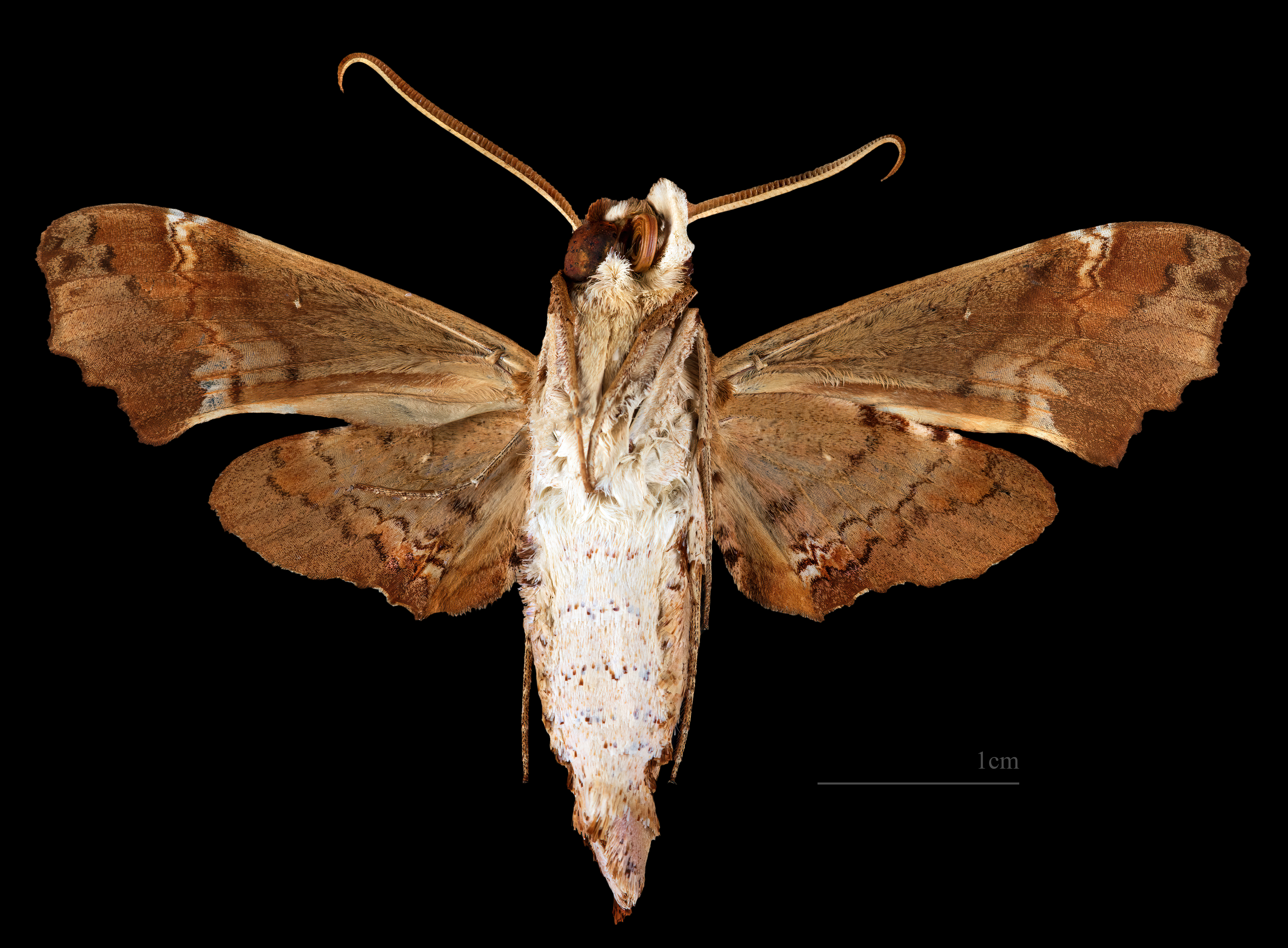
- Unzela pronoe ♂ △

Scientific classification
- Domain: Eukaryota
- Kingdom: Animalia
- Phylum: Arthropoda
- Class: Insecta
- Order: Lepidoptera
- Family: Sphingidae
- Genus: Unzela
- Species: U. pronoe

Binomial name
- Unzela pronoe H. Druce, 1894

Synonyms
- Unzela variegata Rothschild, 1896

= Unzela pronoe =

Species of moth

Unzela pronoe is a moth of the family Sphingidae first described by Herbert Druce in 1894. It is found from Belize, Guatemala and Honduras to Venezuela and south to Bolivia.

The wingspan is 44 mm. There are probably two to three generations per year with adults recorded from May to June, August to September and from December to January.

The larvae probably feed on Vitis tiliifolia and other Vitaceae and Dilleniaceae species, such as Vitis, Cissus rhombifolia and Ampelopsis, Tetracera volubilis, Curatella americana, Tetracera hydrophila and Doliocarpus multiflorus. Ludwigia of the family Onagraceae might also be a host plant.

== Subspecies ==
- Unzela pronoe pronoe (Belize, Guatemala and Honduras to Venezuela and south to Bolivia)
- Unzela pronoe fuscatus Rothschild & Jordan, 1903 (Brazil)
