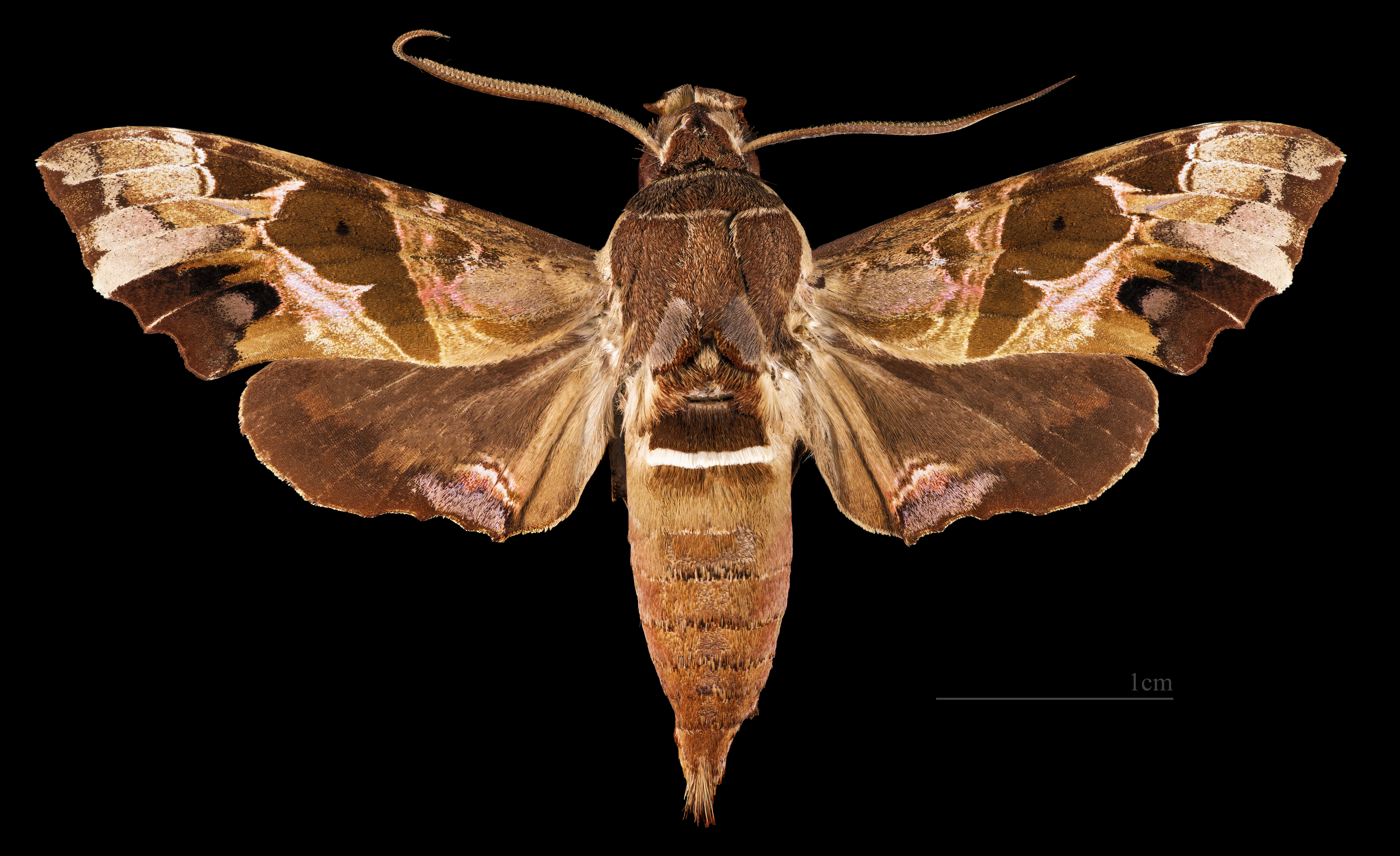
- Unzela japix ♂
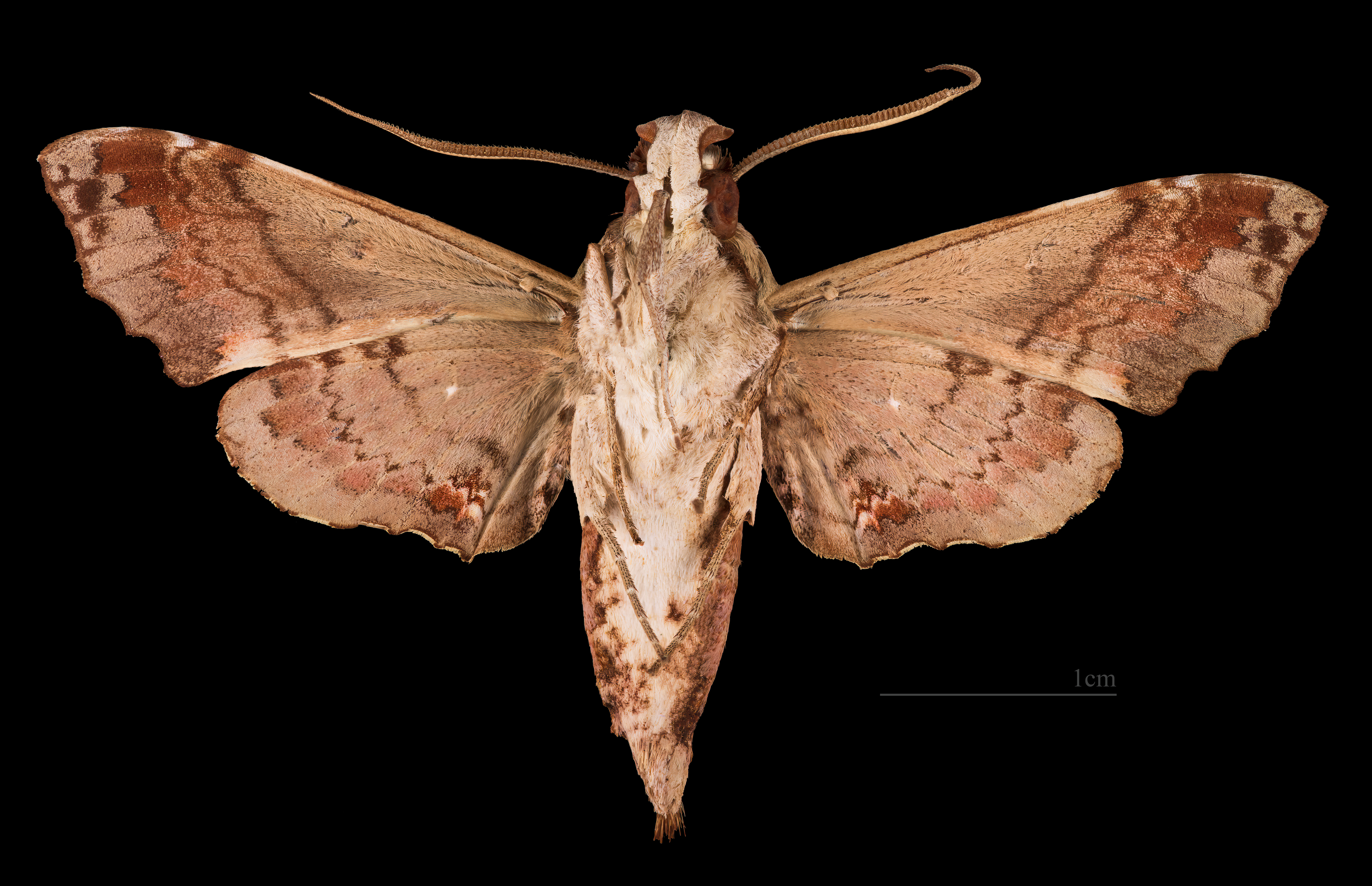
- Unzela japix ♂ △

Scientific classification
- Domain: Eukaryota
- Kingdom: Animalia
- Phylum: Arthropoda
- Class: Insecta
- Order: Lepidoptera
- Family: Sphingidae
- Genus: Unzela
- Species: U. japix

Binomial name
- Unzela japix (Cramer, 1776)

Synonyms
- Sphinx japix Cramer, 1776; Cornipalpus succinctus R. Felder, 1874

= Unzela japix =

Species of moth

Unzela japix is a moth of the family Sphingidae. It is found from Mexico to the Amazon basin. There are also records from Suriname and north-western and south-eastern Venezuela.

The wingspan is 44 mm. There are probably two to three generations per year with adults recorded from May to June, August to September and from December to January.

The larvae possibly feed on Vitaceae and Dilleniaceae species. It has also been recorded from Pinzona coriacea and Tetracera volubilis.

== Subspecies ==
- Unzela japix japix (Mexico to Amazonia, Surinam and Venezuela)
- Unzela japix discrepans Walker, 1856 (Brazil and Argentina)
