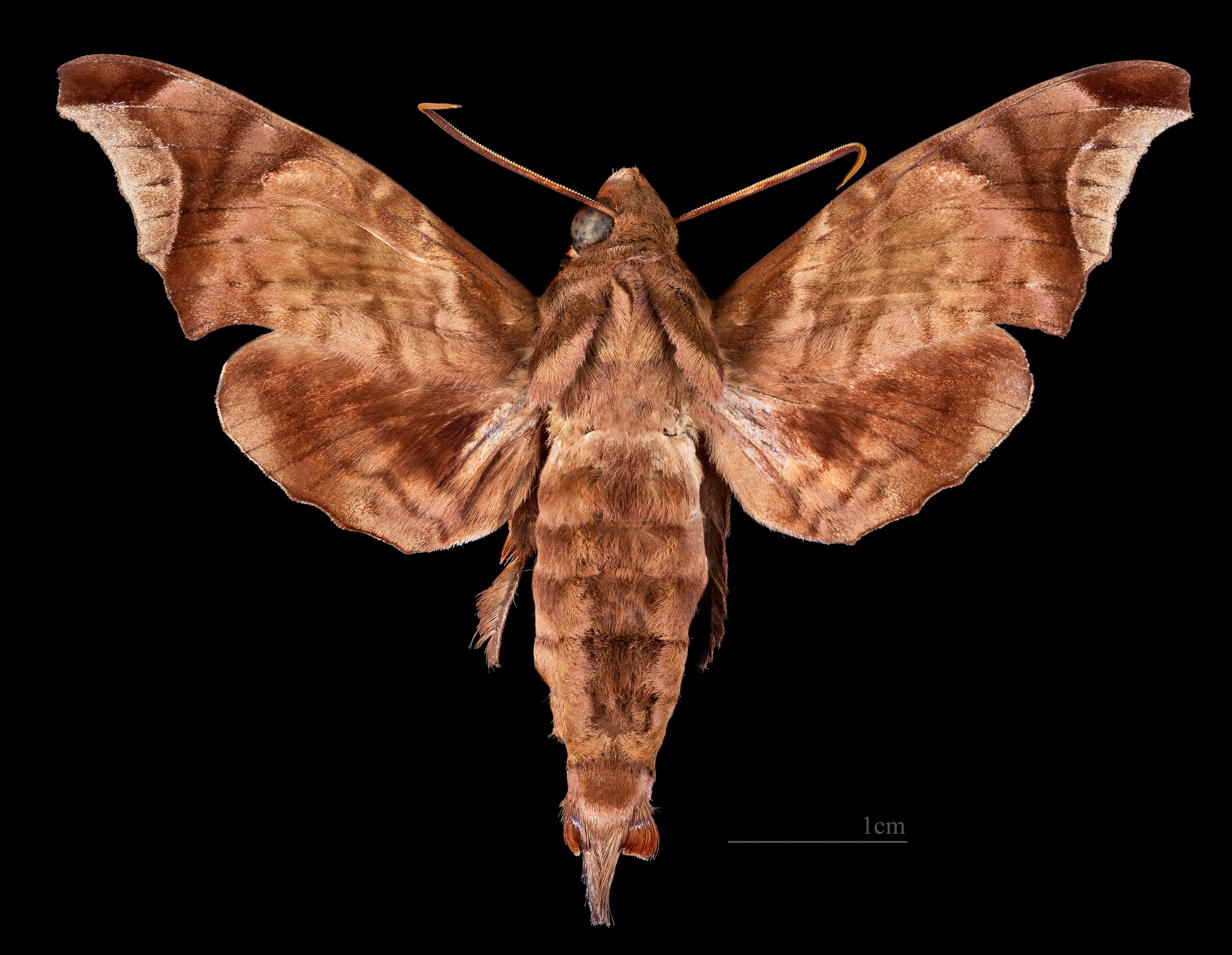
- Enyo taedium taedium ♂
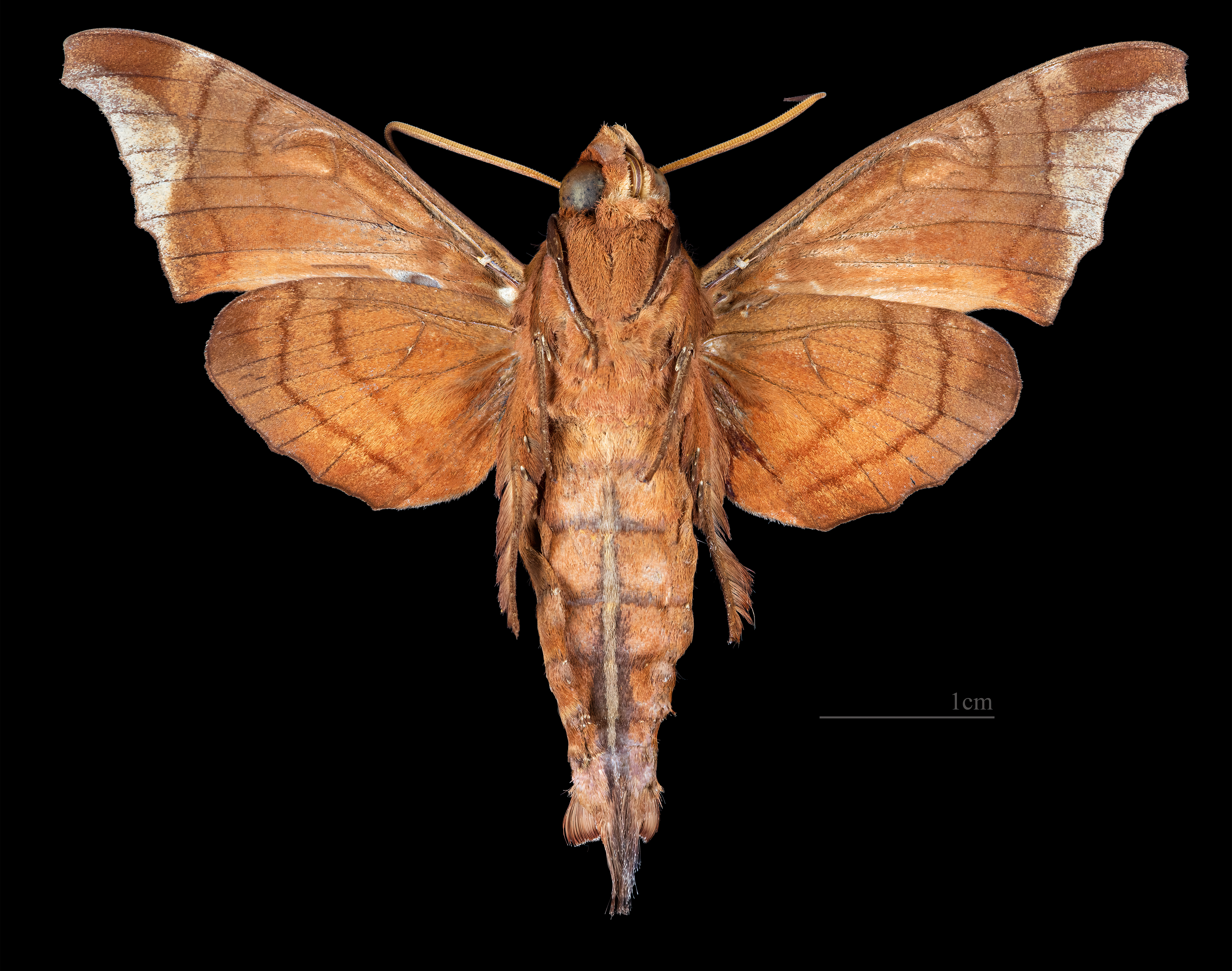
- Enyo taedium taedium ♂ △

Scientific classification
- Domain: Eukaryota
- Kingdom: Animalia
- Phylum: Arthropoda
- Class: Insecta
- Order: Lepidoptera
- Family: Sphingidae
- Genus: Enyo
- Species: E. taedium

Binomial name
- Enyo taedium Schaus, 1890

Synonyms
- Epistor taedium reconditus Kernbach, 1957; Epistor taedium australis Rothschild & Jordan, 1903

= Enyo taedium =

Species of moth

Enyo taedium is a species of moth in the family Sphingidae. It was described by Schaus, in 1890.

== Distribution ==
It is found from Mexico and Belize south to Costa Rica, northern Venezuela and Ecuador.

== Biology ==
Adults are on wing in May in Costa Rica.

The larvae probably feed on Vitus tiliifolia and other members of the Vitaceae and Dilleniaceae families, such as Vitis, Cissus rhombifolia and Ampelopsis, Tetracera volubilis, Curatella americana, Tetracera hydrophila and Doliocarpus multiflorus. Ludwigia of the Onagraceae is also a possible host.

== Subspecies ==
- Enyo taedium taedium (Mexico and Belize south to Costa Rica, northern Venezuela and Ecuador)
- Enyo taedium australis (Rothschild & Jordan, 1903) (Brazil)
