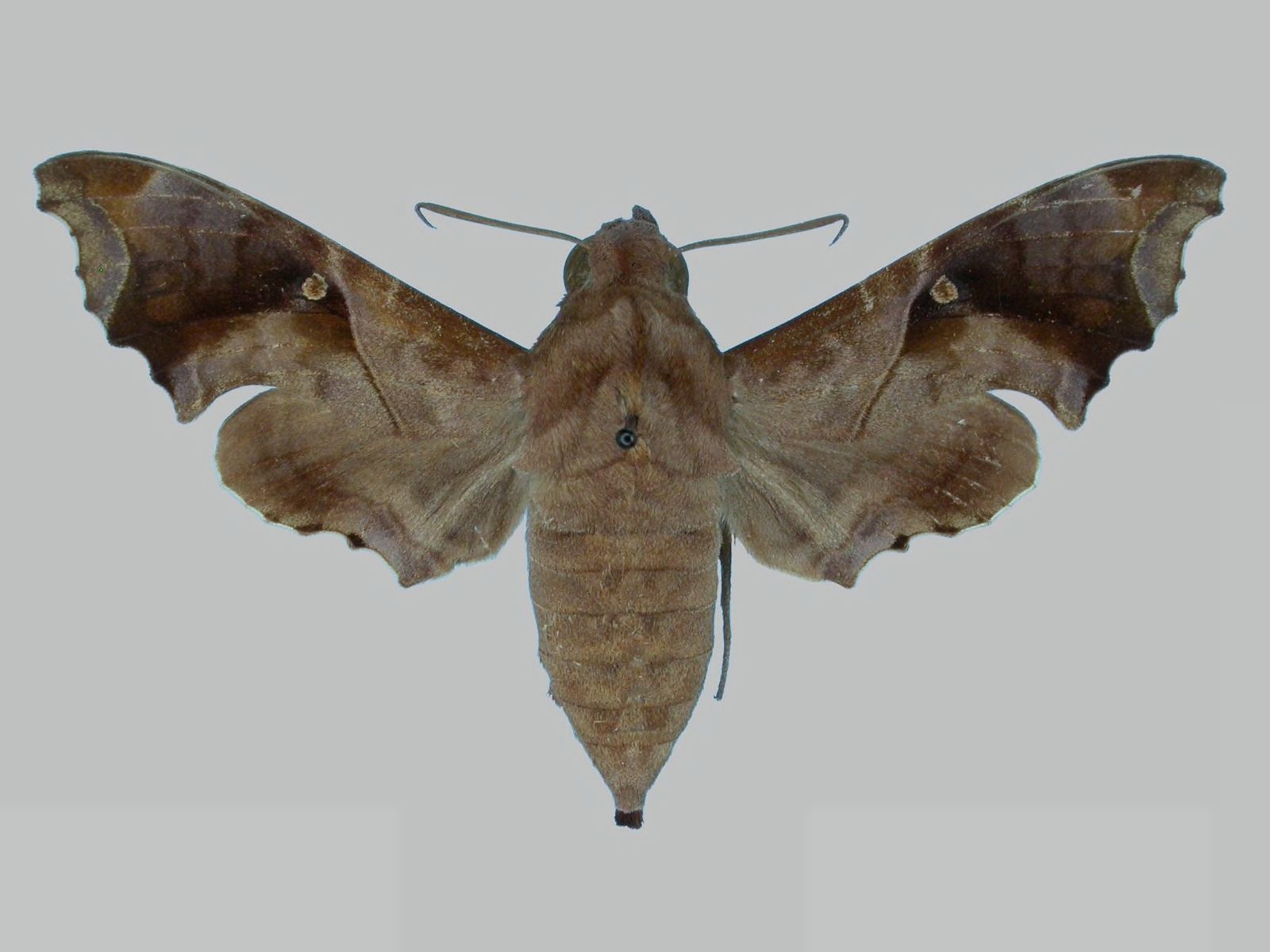

Scientific classification
- Domain: Eukaryota
- Kingdom: Animalia
- Phylum: Arthropoda
- Class: Insecta
- Order: Lepidoptera
- Family: Sphingidae
- Genus: Enyo
- Species: E. latipennis

Binomial name
- Enyo latipennis (Rothschild & Jordan, 1903)

Synonyms
- Epistor latipennis Rothschild & Jordan, 1903

= Enyo latipennis =

Species of moth

Enyo latipennis is a species of moth in the family Sphingidae. It was described by Rothschild and Jordan, in 1903. It is known from Jamaica.

There are probably two or three generations per year.
