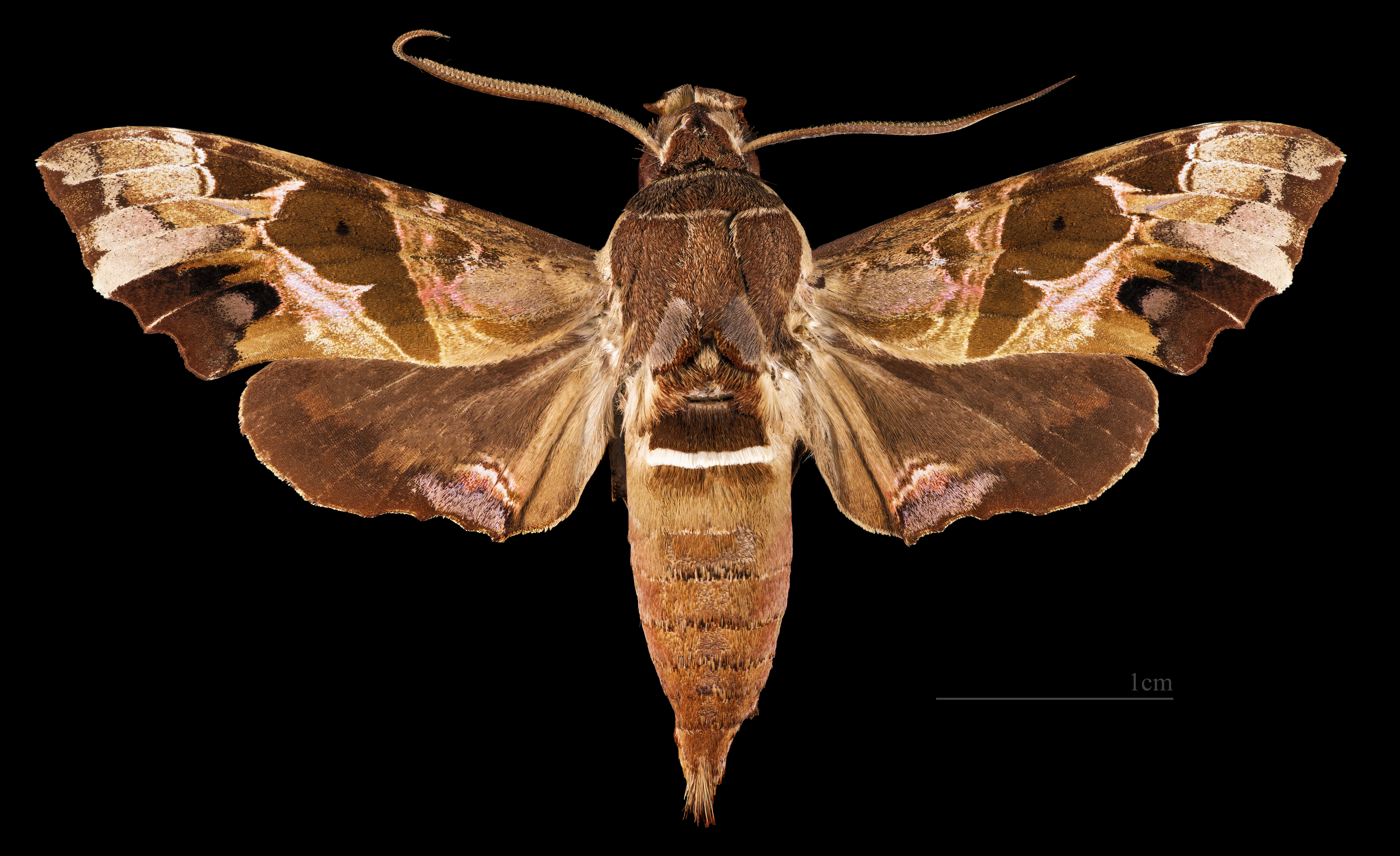
- Unzela japix

Scientific classification
- Kingdom: Animalia
- Phylum: Arthropoda
- Class: Insecta
- Order: Lepidoptera
- Family: Sphingidae
- Subtribe: Dilophonotina
- Genus: Unzela; Walker, 1856

Synonyms
- Cornipalpus R. Felder, 1874

= Unzela =

Genus of moths

Unzela is a genus of moths in the family Sphingidae. The genus was erected by Francis Walker in 1856.

== Species ==
- Unzela japix (Cramer, 1776)
- Unzela pronoe H. Druce, 1894
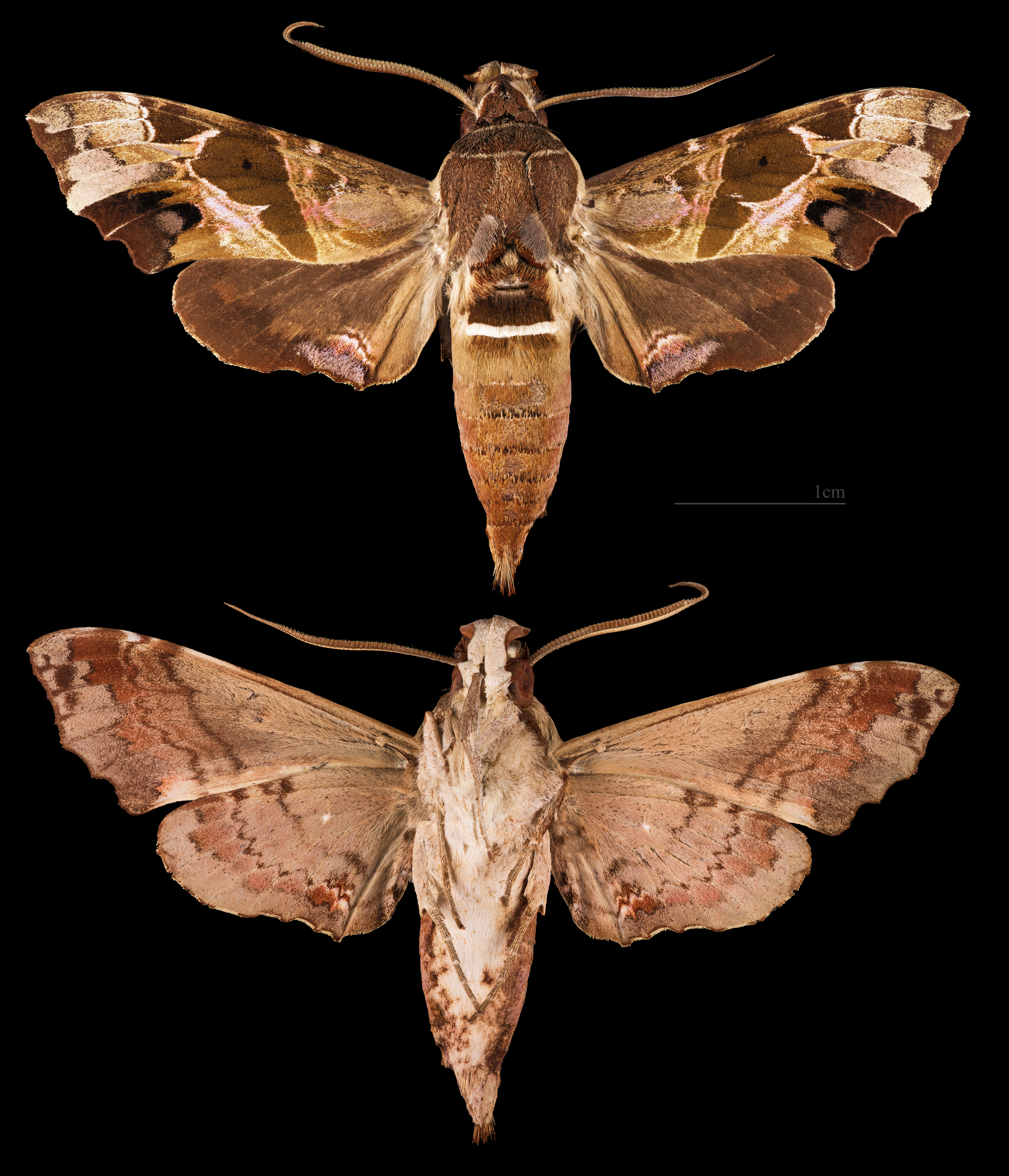
Unzela japix

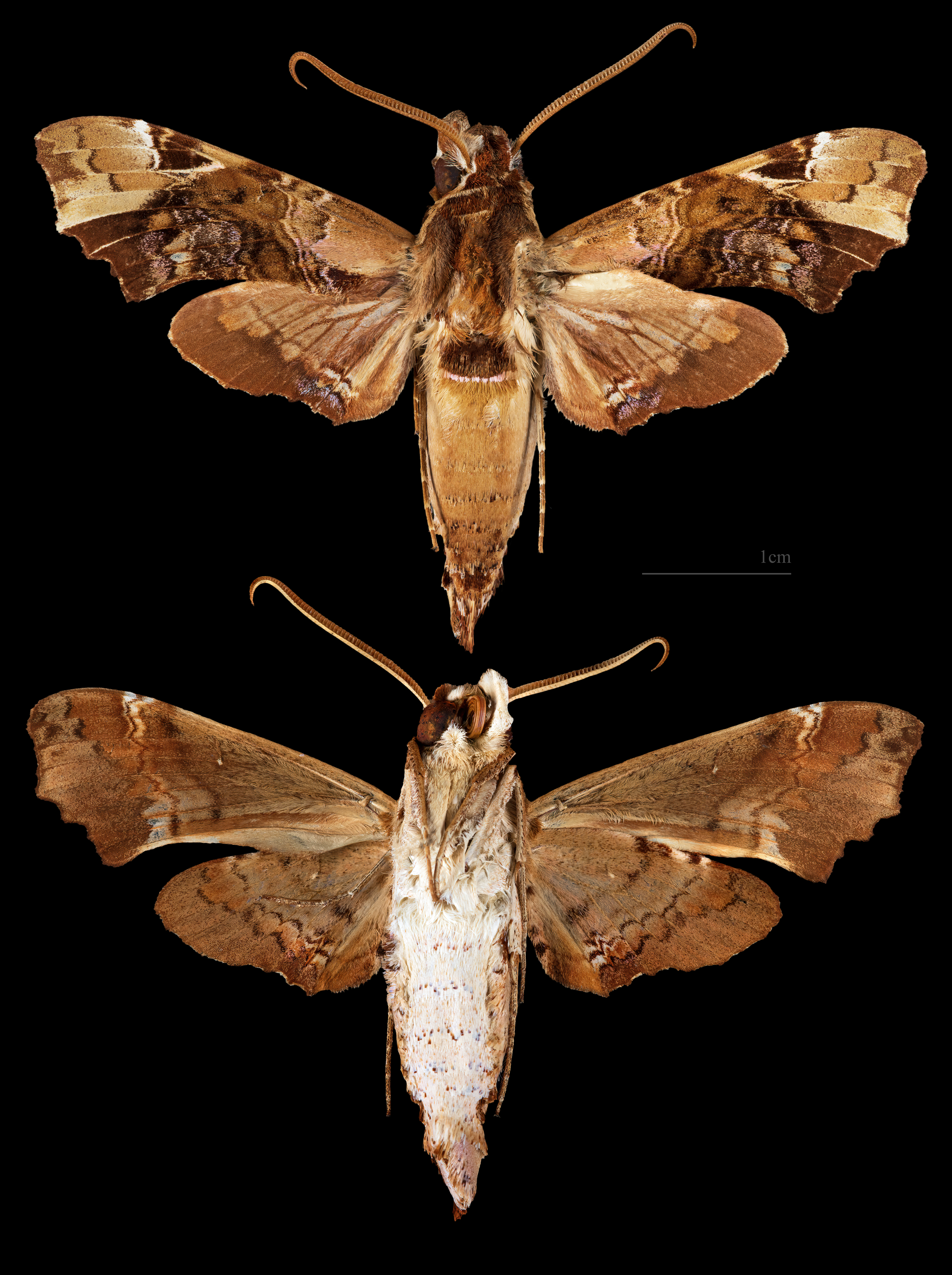
Unzela pronoe
