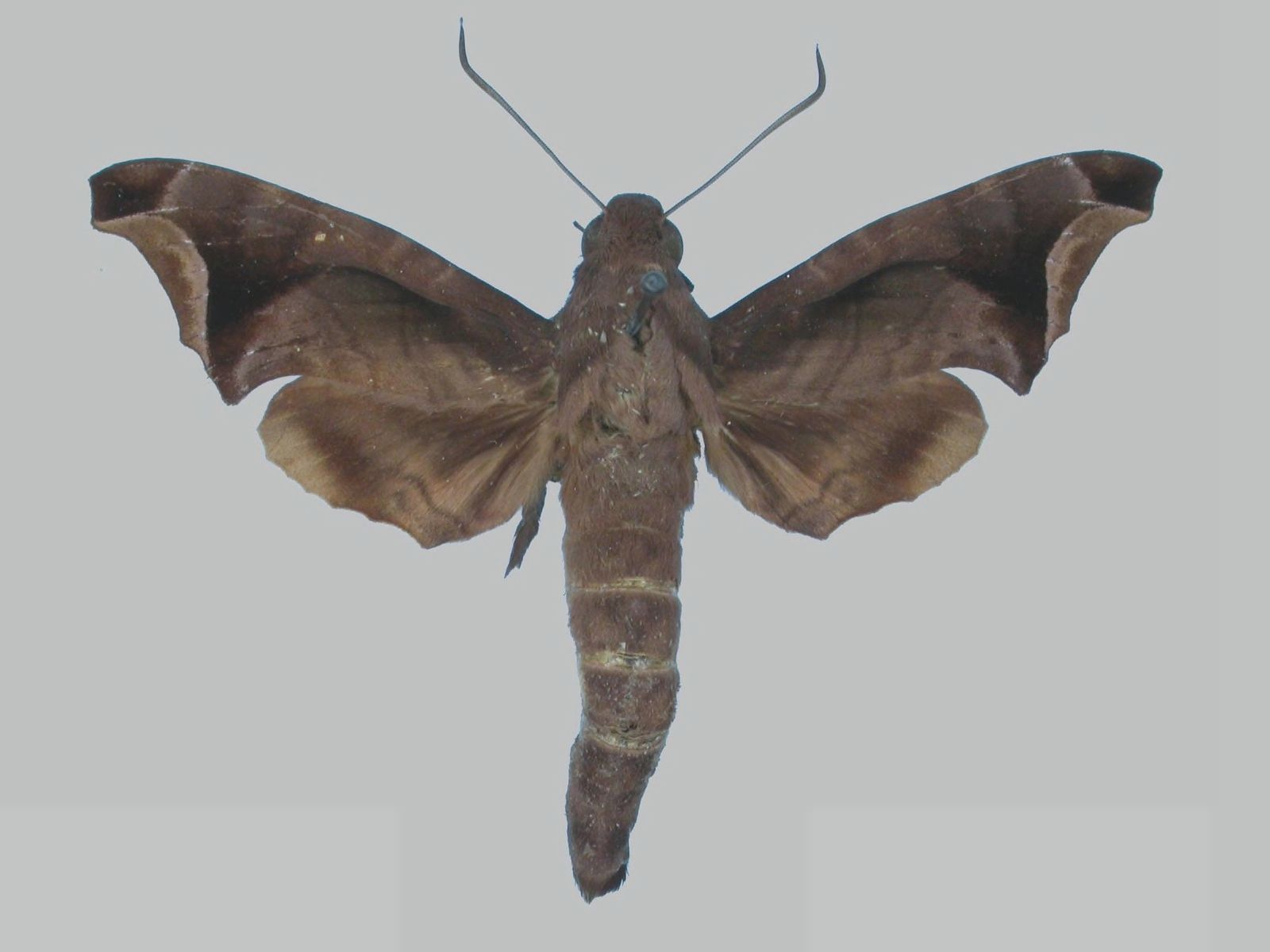
- Type specimen of Enyo bathus

Scientific classification
- Domain: Eukaryota
- Kingdom: Animalia
- Phylum: Arthropoda
- Class: Insecta
- Order: Lepidoptera
- Family: Sphingidae
- Genus: Enyo
- Species: E. bathus

Binomial name
- Enyo bathus (Rothschild, 1904)

Synonyms
- Epistor bathus Rothschild, 1904

= Enyo bathus =

Species of moth

Enyo bathus is a moth of the family Sphingidae. It is known from Peru and Bolivia.

There are probably two to three generations per year.

== Subspecies ==
- Enyo bathus bathus (Peru)
- Enyo bathus otiosus Kernbach, 1957 (Bolivia)
