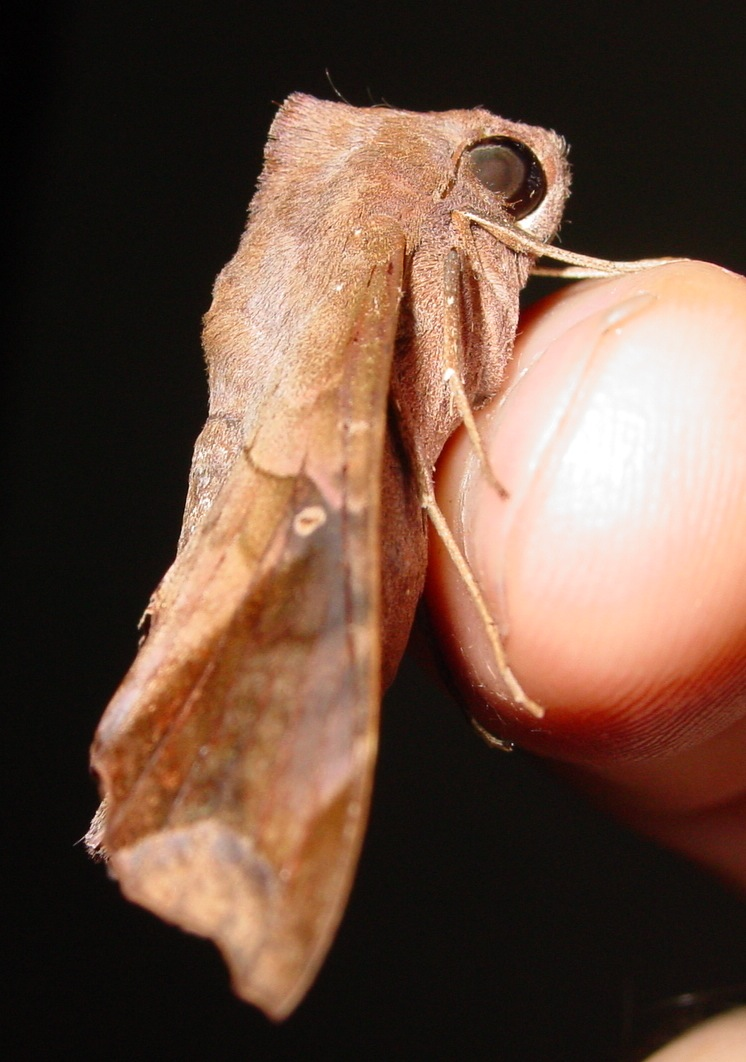
- Enyo lugubris

Scientific classification
- Domain: Eukaryota
- Kingdom: Animalia
- Phylum: Arthropoda
- Class: Insecta
- Order: Lepidoptera
- Family: Sphingidae
- Subtribe: Dilophonotina
- Genus: Enyo; Hübner, 1819

Species
- See text

Synonyms
- Epistor Boisduval, 1875; Triptogon Ménétriés, 1857

= Enyo (moth) =

Genus of moths

Enyo is a genus of moths in the family Sphingidae. The genus was erected by Jacob Hübner in 1819.

== Species ==
- Enyo bathus (Rothschild, 1904)
- Enyo boisduvali (Oberthur, 1904)
- Enyo cavifer (Rothschild & Jordan, 1903)
- Enyo gorgon (Cramer, 1777)
- Enyo latipennis (Rothschild & Jordan, 1903)
- Enyo lugubris (Linnaeus, 1771)
- Enyo ocypete (Linnaeus, 1758)
- Enyo taedium Schaus, 1890
Enyo cavifer

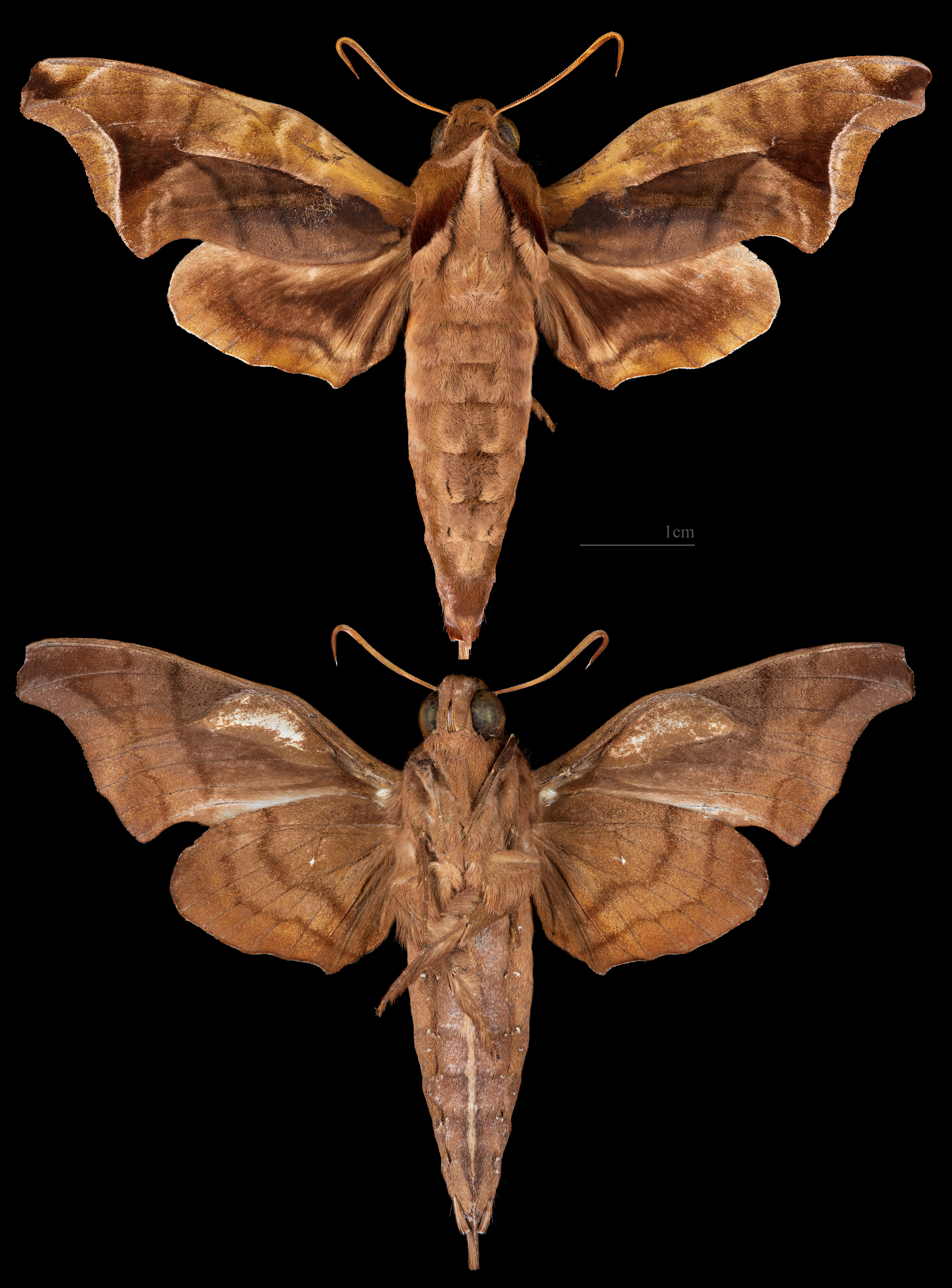
Enyo gorgon

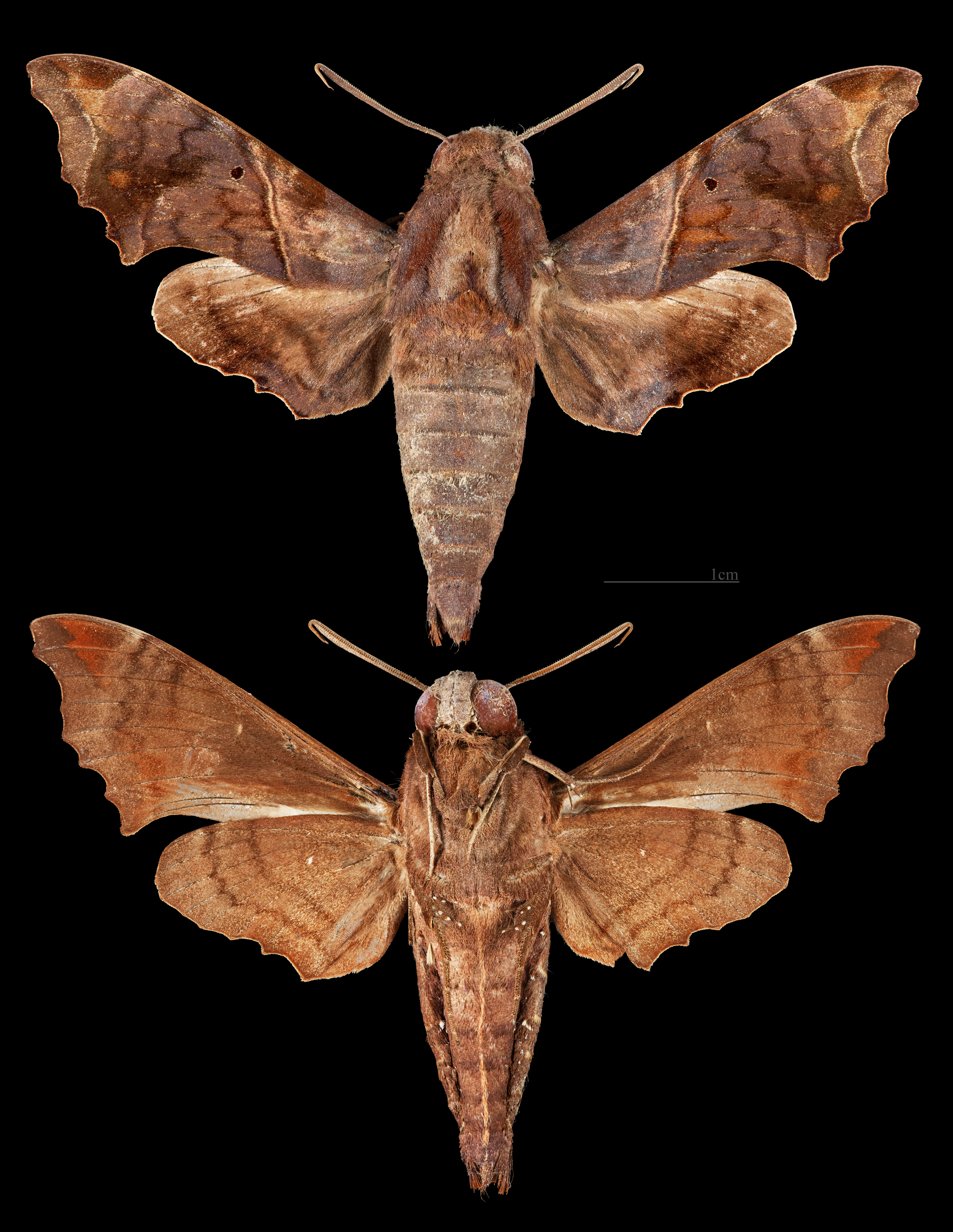
Enyo latipennis

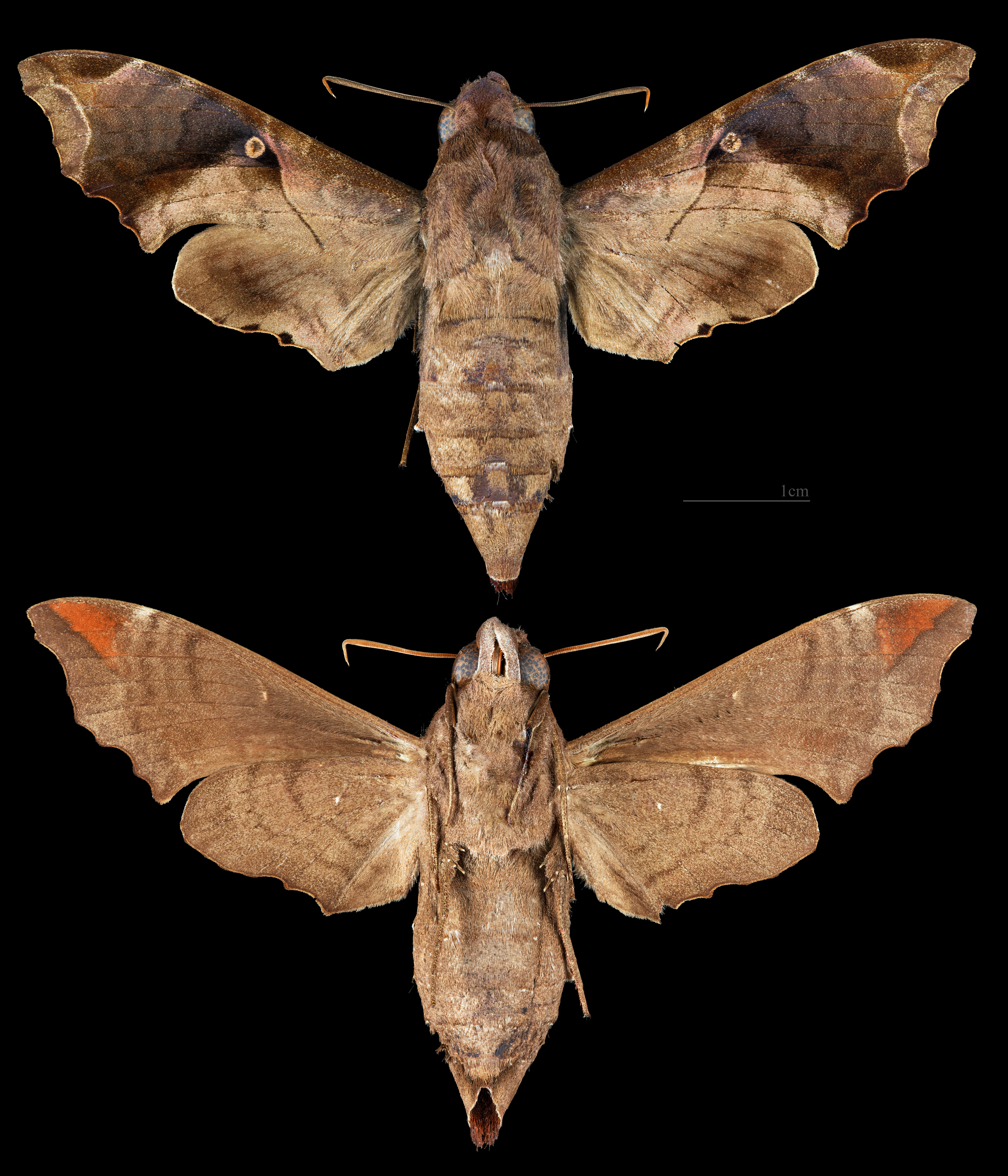
Enyo lugubris

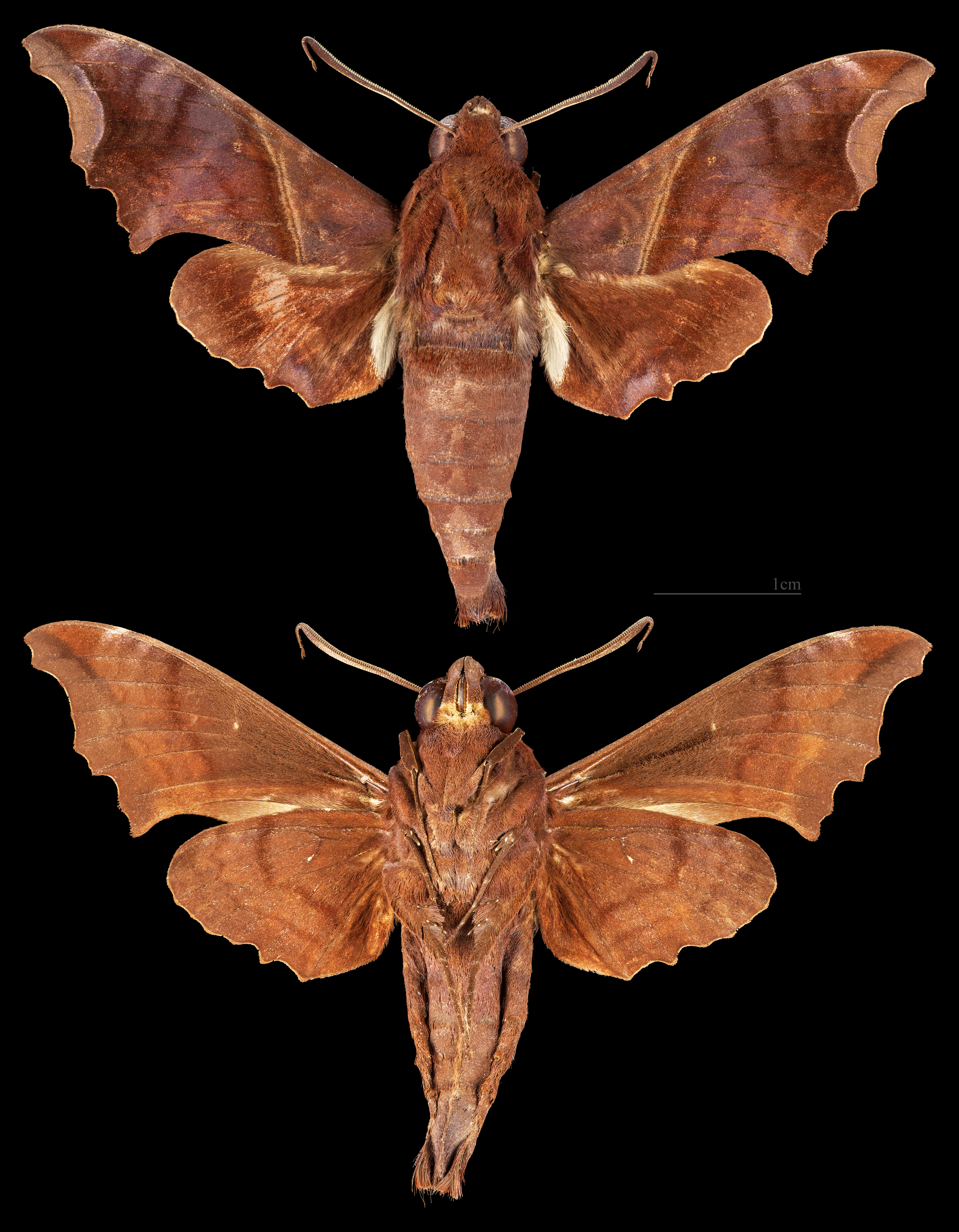
Enyo ocypete

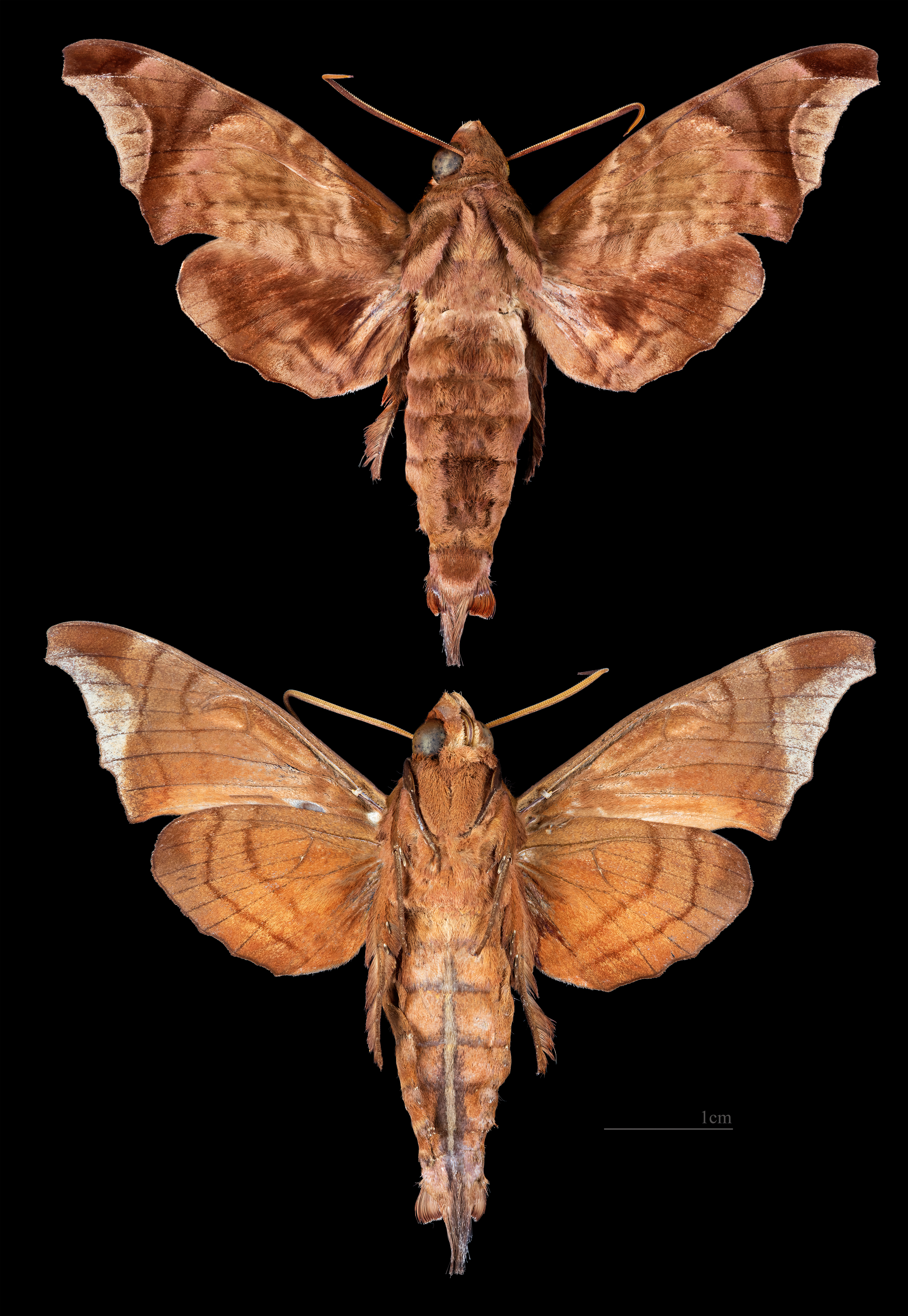
Enyo taedium
