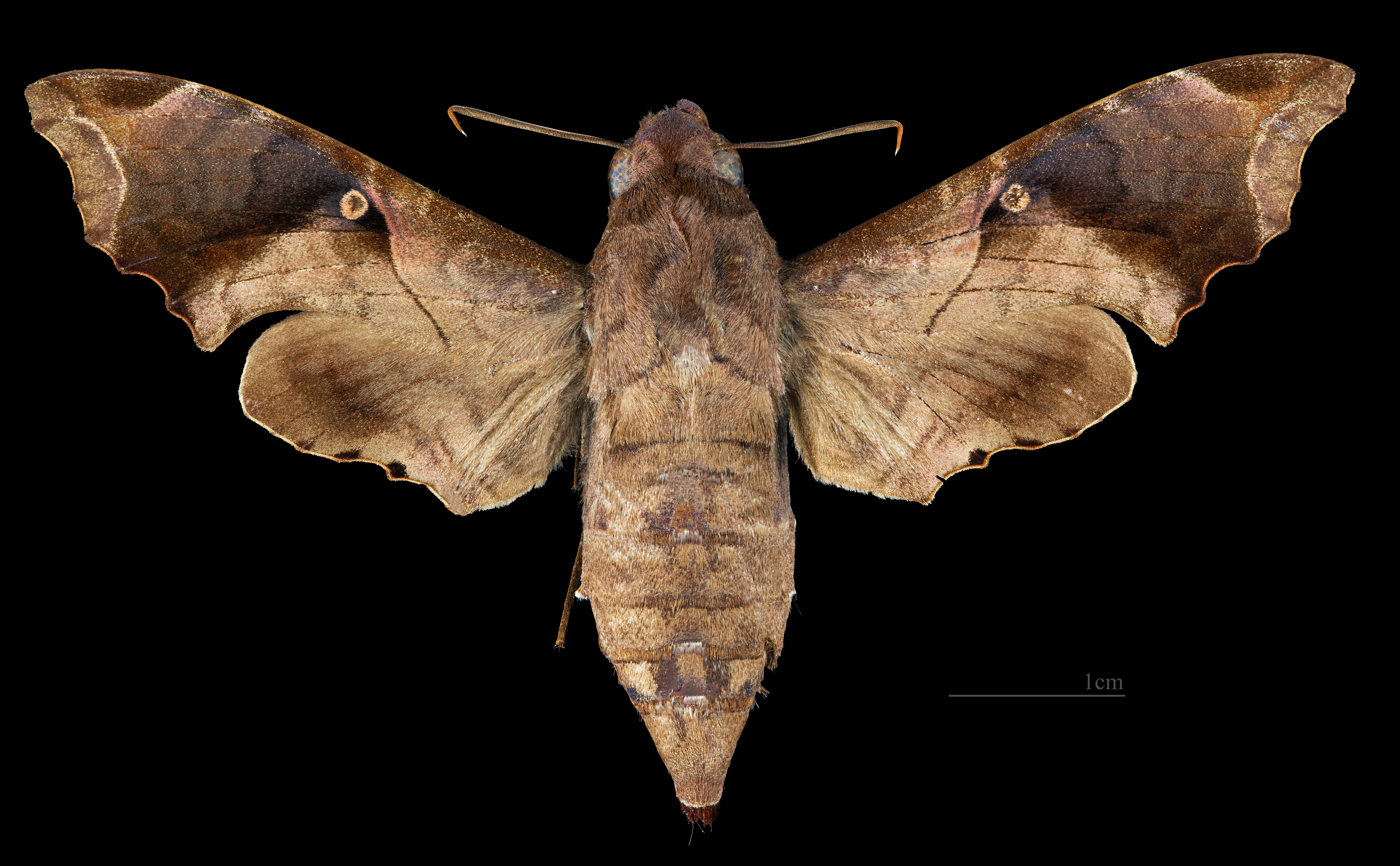
- Enyo lugubris female dorsal
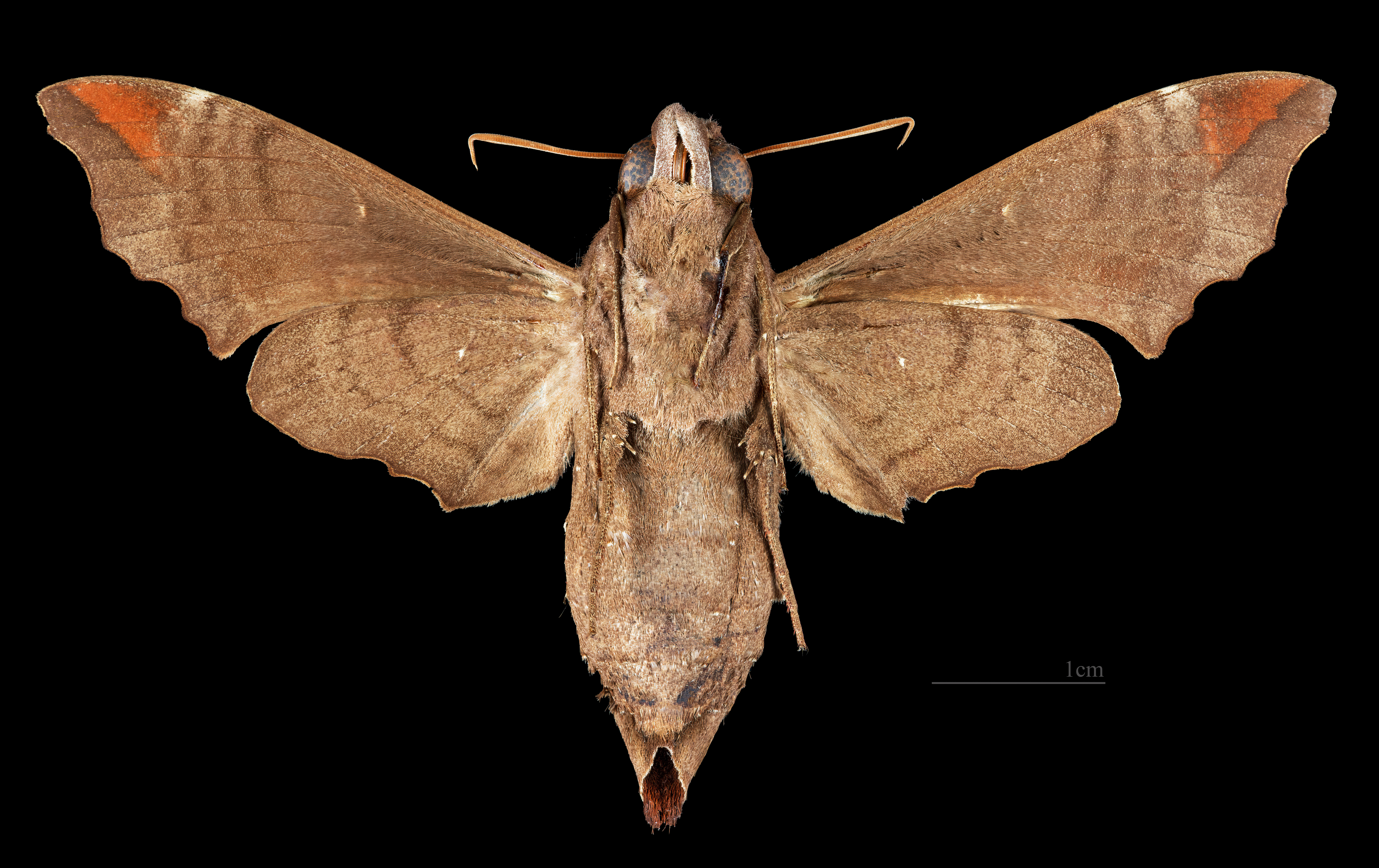
- Enyo lugubris female ventral

Scientific classification
- Kingdom: Animalia
- Phylum: Arthropoda
- Clade: Pancrustacea
- Class: Insecta
- Order: Lepidoptera
- Family: Sphingidae
- Genus: Enyo
- Species: E. lugubris

Binomial name
- Enyo lugubris (Linnaeus, 1771)

Synonyms
- Sphinx lugubris Linnaeus, 1771; Sphinx fegeus Cramer, 1779; Epistor luctuosus Boisduval, 1875; Epistor lugubris delanoi Kernbach, 1962

= Enyo lugubris =

Mournful sphinx

Species of moth

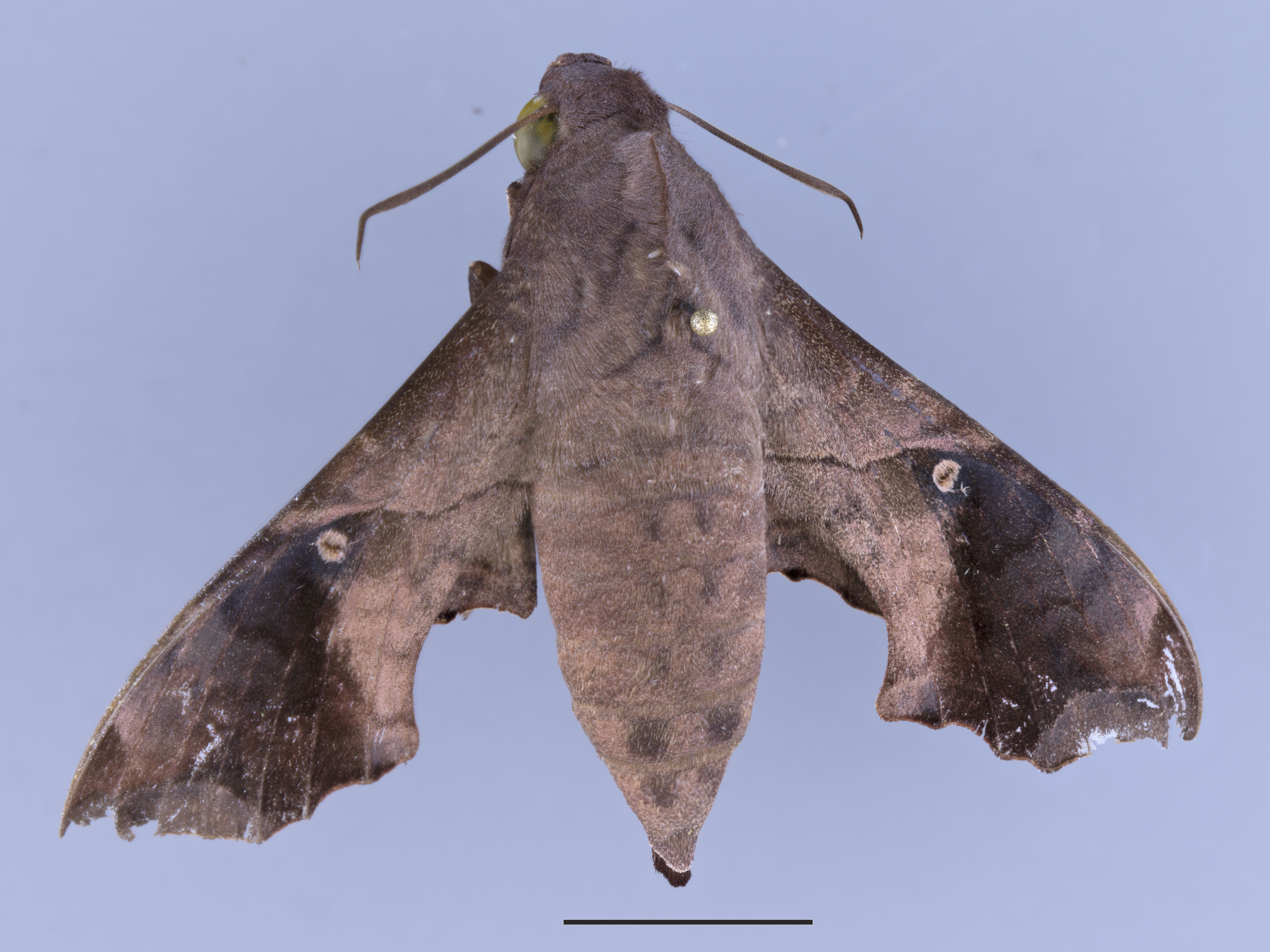
Enyo lugubris (Linnaeus, 1771) Order: Lepidoptera. Family: Sphingidae. Scale bar: 1cm Collected in GA, Baldwin Co., GCSU front campus on 10 October 2024 by Kaitlin Acosta.

Enyo lugubris, the mournful sphinx, is a moth of the family Sphingidae. It is found from Argentina and Paraguay to Uruguay, Venezuela, Guyana, Suriname, French Guiana, Colombia, Ecuador, Peru, Brazil and the West Indies through Belize, Guatemala, Honduras, El Salvador, Nicaragua, Costa Rica and Panama to Mexico and the United States, where it has been recorded from Arizona east to Florida and north to South Carolina. Strays have been recorded from Arkansas, north to Illinois, Michigan and New York.

The wingspan is 50–60 mm.

Adults are on wing year-round in the tropics (including southern Florida and Louisiana). Further north, they are on wing from August to November.

The larvae probably feed on Vitus tiliifolia and other Vitaceae species, such as Vitis, Cissus and Ampelopsis. In Florida larvae have been reported on Cissus sicyoides and Ampelopsis arborea.

== Subspecies ==
- Enyo lugubris lugubris
- Enyo lugubris delanoi (Kernbach, 1962) (Galapagos Islands)
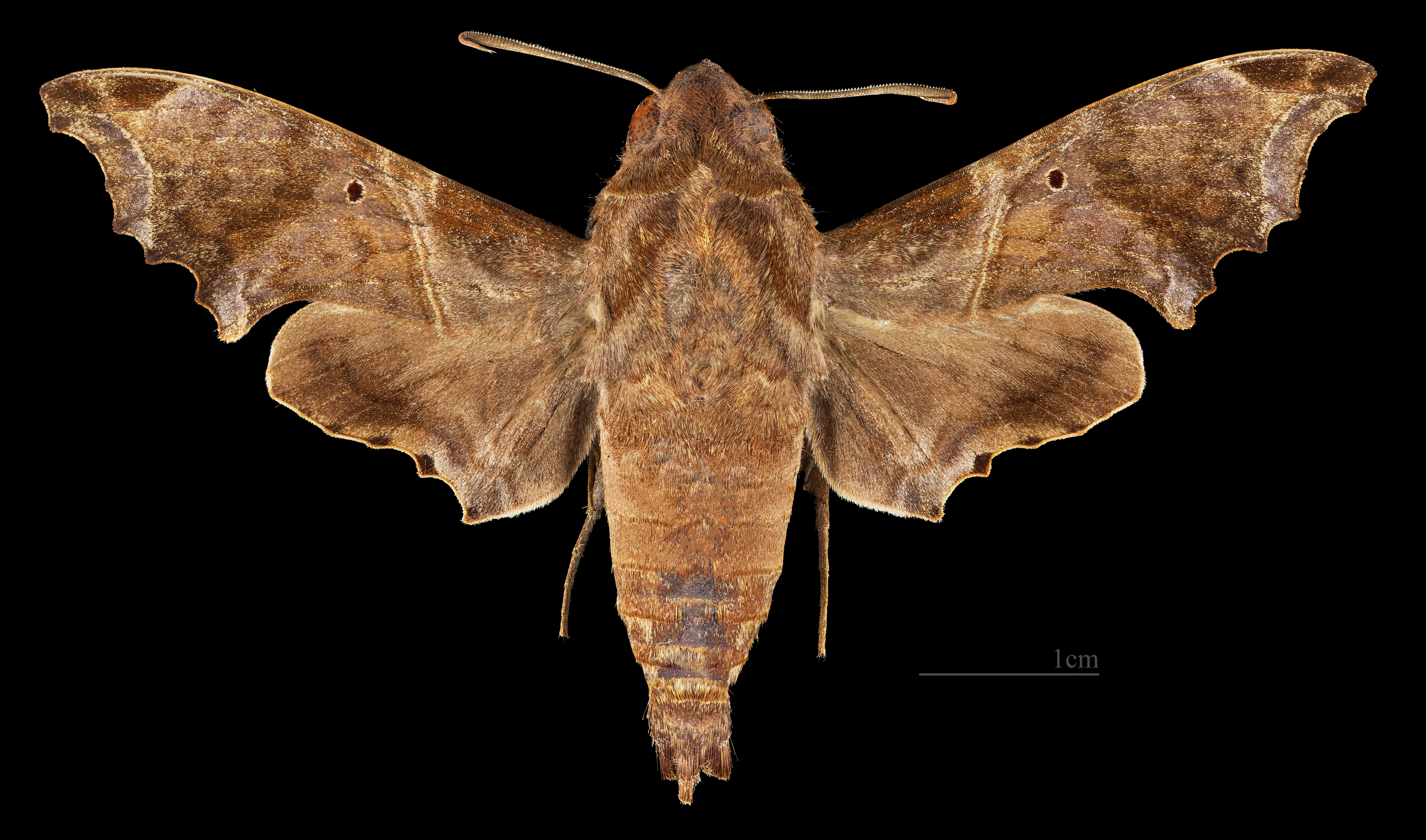
Enyo lugubris delanoi ♂

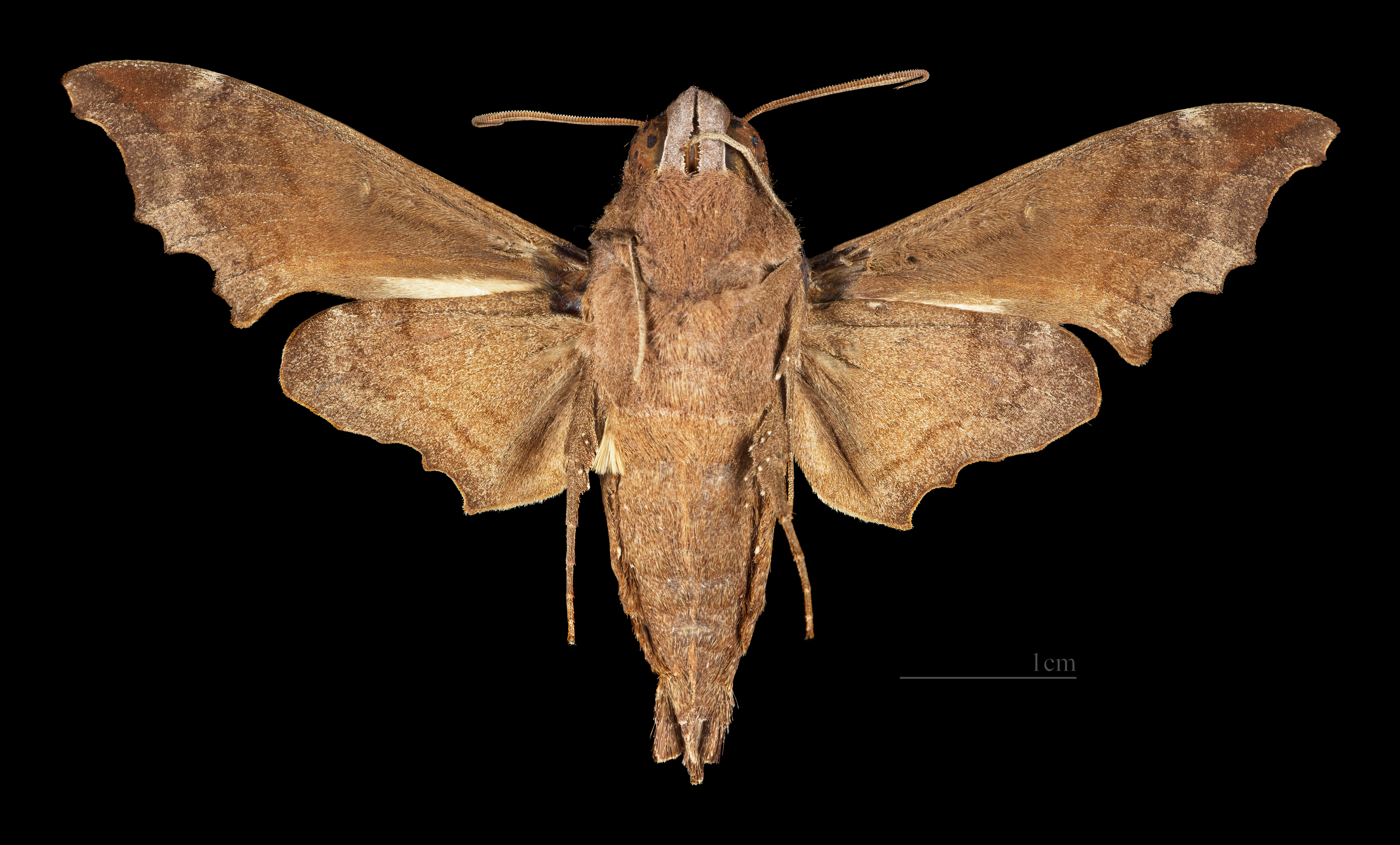
Enyo lugubris delanoi♂ △
