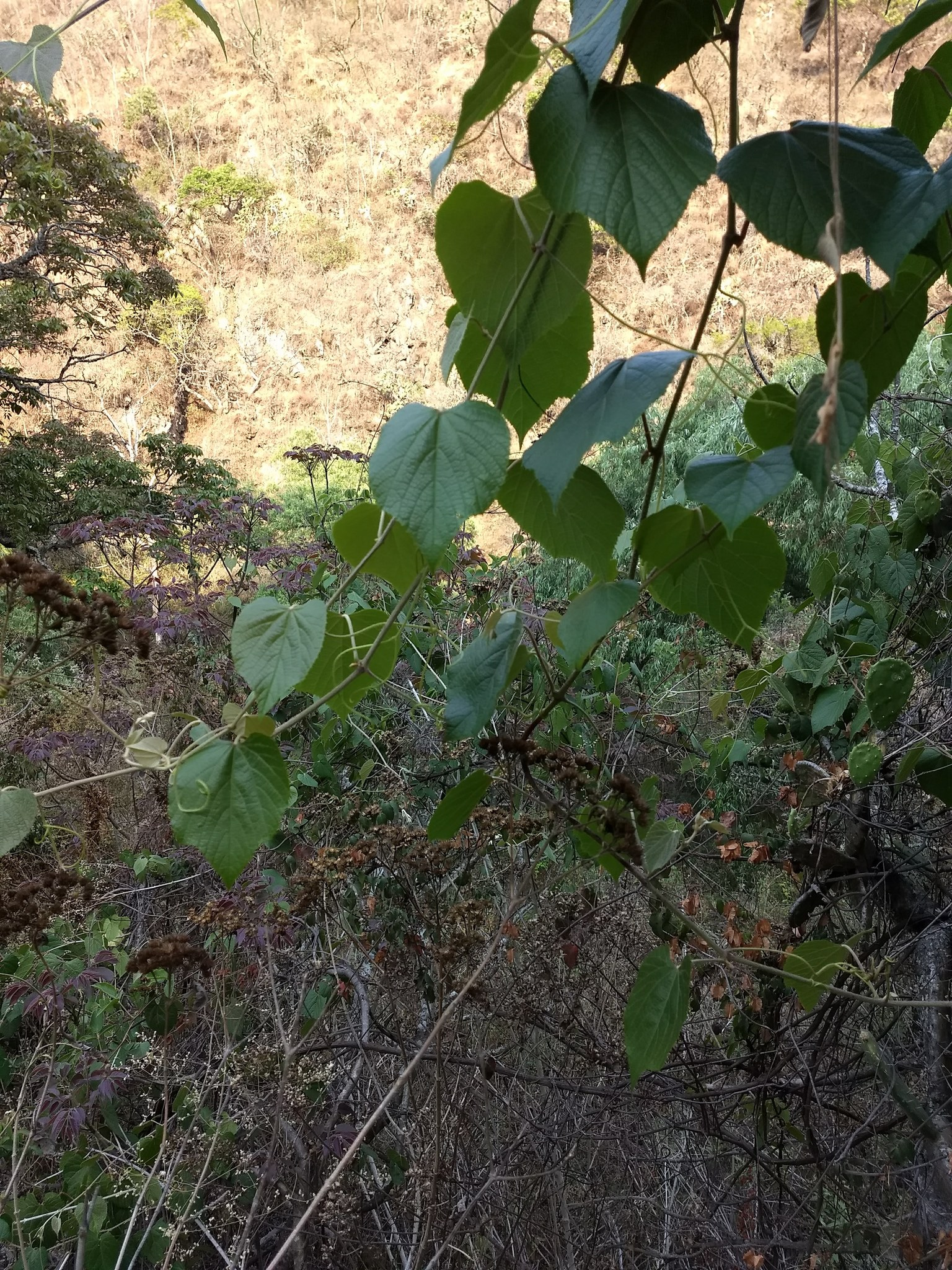

Scientific classification
- Kingdom: Plantae
- Clade: Tracheophytes
- Clade: Angiosperms
- Clade: Eudicots
- Clade: Rosids
- Order: Vitales
- Family: Vitaceae
- Genus: Vitis
- Species: V. tiliifolia

Binomial name
- Vitis tiliifolia Humb. & Bonpl. ex Schult.

Synonyms
- Vitis caribaea DC.

= Vitis tiliifolia =

Caribbean grape

Species of plant

Vitis tiliifolia is a New World liana in the grape family commonly known as Caribbean grape. Other names include West Indian grape, water vine, Agrá and Bejuco de Agua (in Costa Rica) and (in Belizean Creole) water tie-tie and water-wise.

== Distribution ==
Vitis tiliifolia is native to most of Mexico (including Baja Sur, Campeche, Chiapas, Colima, Durango, Guanajuato, Guerrero, Hidalgo, Jalisco, México, Michoacán, Morelos, Nayarit, Oaxaca, Puebla, Querétaro, Quintana Roo, San Luis Potosí, Sinaloa, Tabasco, Veracruz and Yucatán states) and in many other countries in the Americas and the Caribbean (Belize, Colombia, Costa Rica - where it is most common between 500 and 1,000 meters altitude, Cuba, Dominican Republic, Ecuador, El Salvador, Guadeloupe, Guatemala, Haiti, Honduras, Jamaica, Nicaragua, Panama, Puerto Rico, U.S. Virgin Islands and St Lucia).

== Uses ==
Vitis tiliifolia is grown as a forest crop in Mayan agriculture, and is used for food or drink, or as an ingredient in medicines.

The vine is most commonly dioecious, with separate male and female vines, though wild hermafrodite vines have been found. Flowering is usually at the beginning of the dry season (December in the northern hemisphere) and fruit production can be up to 20 kg per vine in cultivation. The fruits are small and acid with low sugar near 8 Brix but are sometimes made into wine resembling that of the Norton grape of the east and central USA. In cultivation the vines are vigorous similar to the Muscadine grape and should be given ample trellis room of near 6 meters or 20 feet. V. tiliifolia can and should be pruned and can be propagated from cuttings just like other grapes.

== Pests ==
Vitis tiliifolia may have some resistance to Pierce's disease (PD), which afflicts many commercial grape species; it has exhibited atypical symptoms despite harboring high populations of the plant pathogen Xylella fastidiosa, which causes PD.
