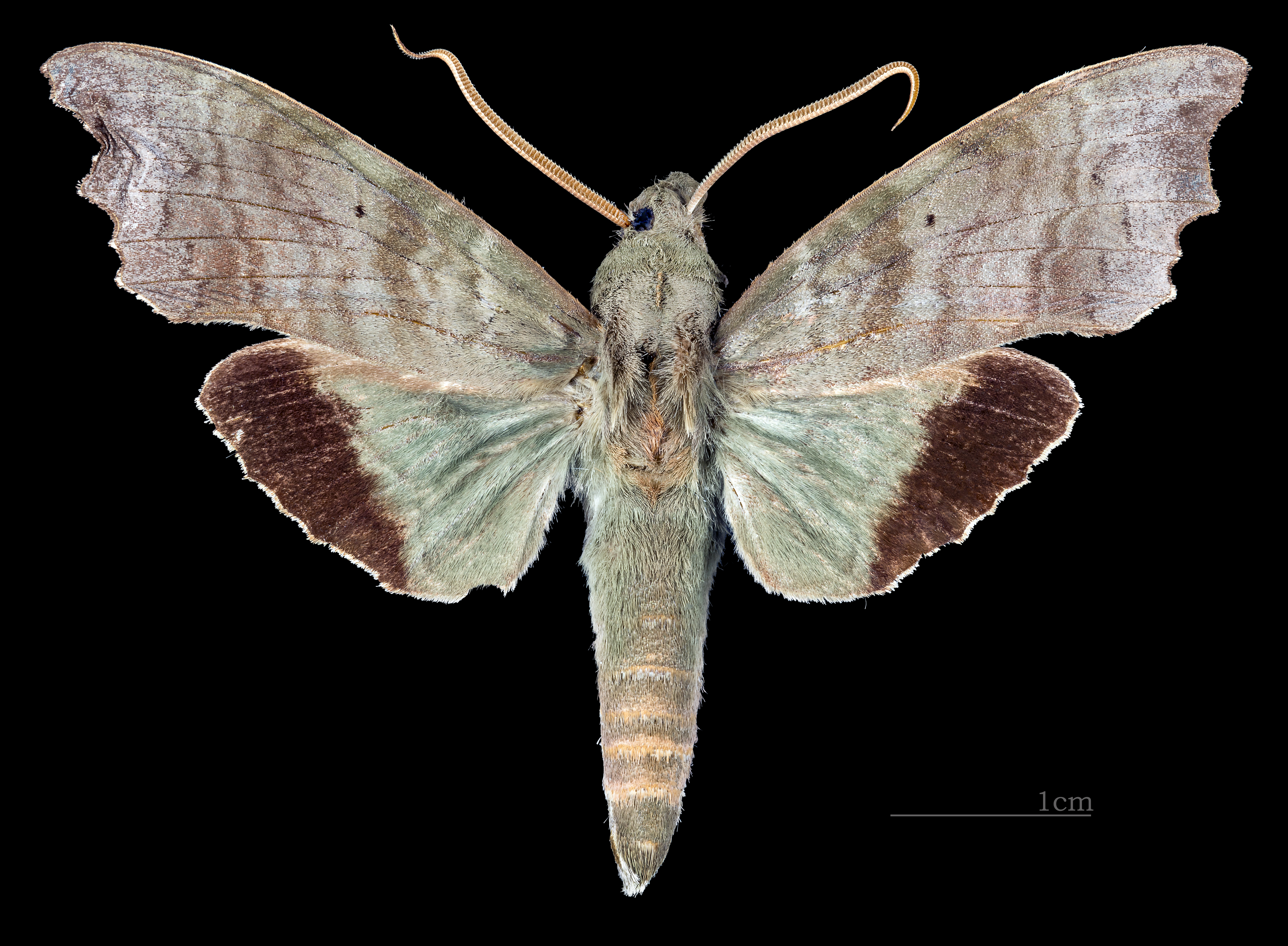
- Male dorsal
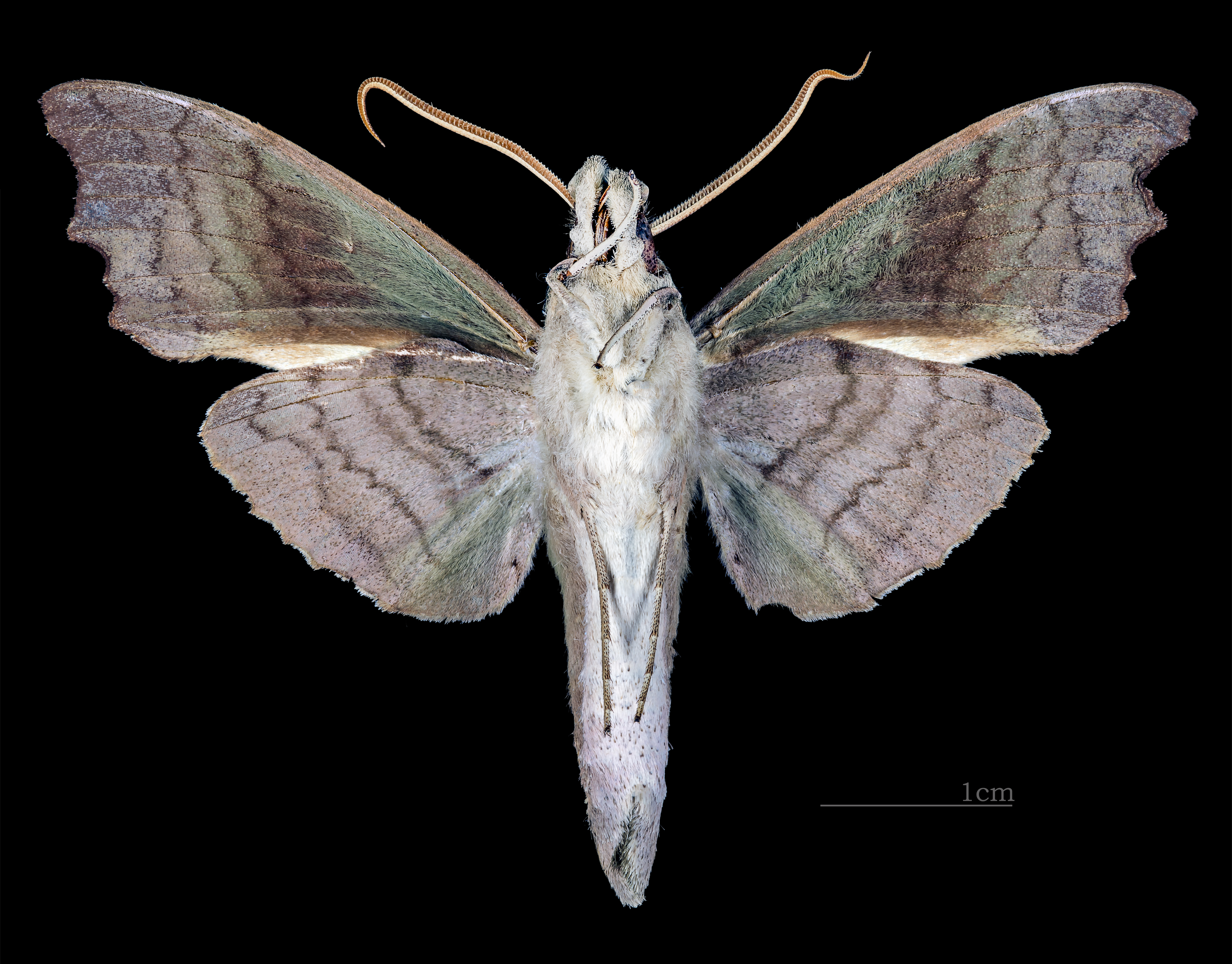
- Male ventral

Scientific classification
- Domain: Eukaryota
- Kingdom: Animalia
- Phylum: Arthropoda
- Class: Insecta
- Order: Lepidoptera
- Family: Sphingidae
- Genus: Aleuron
- Species: A. chloroptera

Binomial name
- Aleuron chloroptera (Perty, [1833])

Synonyms
- Sphinx chloroptera Perty, [1833]; Aleuron chloropterum; Aleuron disis Boisduval, 1875

= Aleuron chloroptera =

Species of moth

Aleuron chloroptera is a moth of the family Sphingidae. It was described by Maximilian Perty in 1833, and is known from southern Mexico, Brazil, Belize, Guatemala, Nicaragua, Costa Rica, Colombia, Peru, Bolivia, Venezuela, Guyana, Suriname, French Guiana, Paraguay, Argentina and Ecuador. It is probably also present in Uruguay, Honduras, El Salvador and Panama.

The wingspan is 64–70 mm. Adults are on wing at least from April to January. In Costa Rica adults have been recorded in January, from April to August and from November to December. Adults feed on the nectar of Callianra, Inga and Duranta species.

The larvae feed on Curatella americana, Davilla nitida and probably other Dilleniaceae species.
