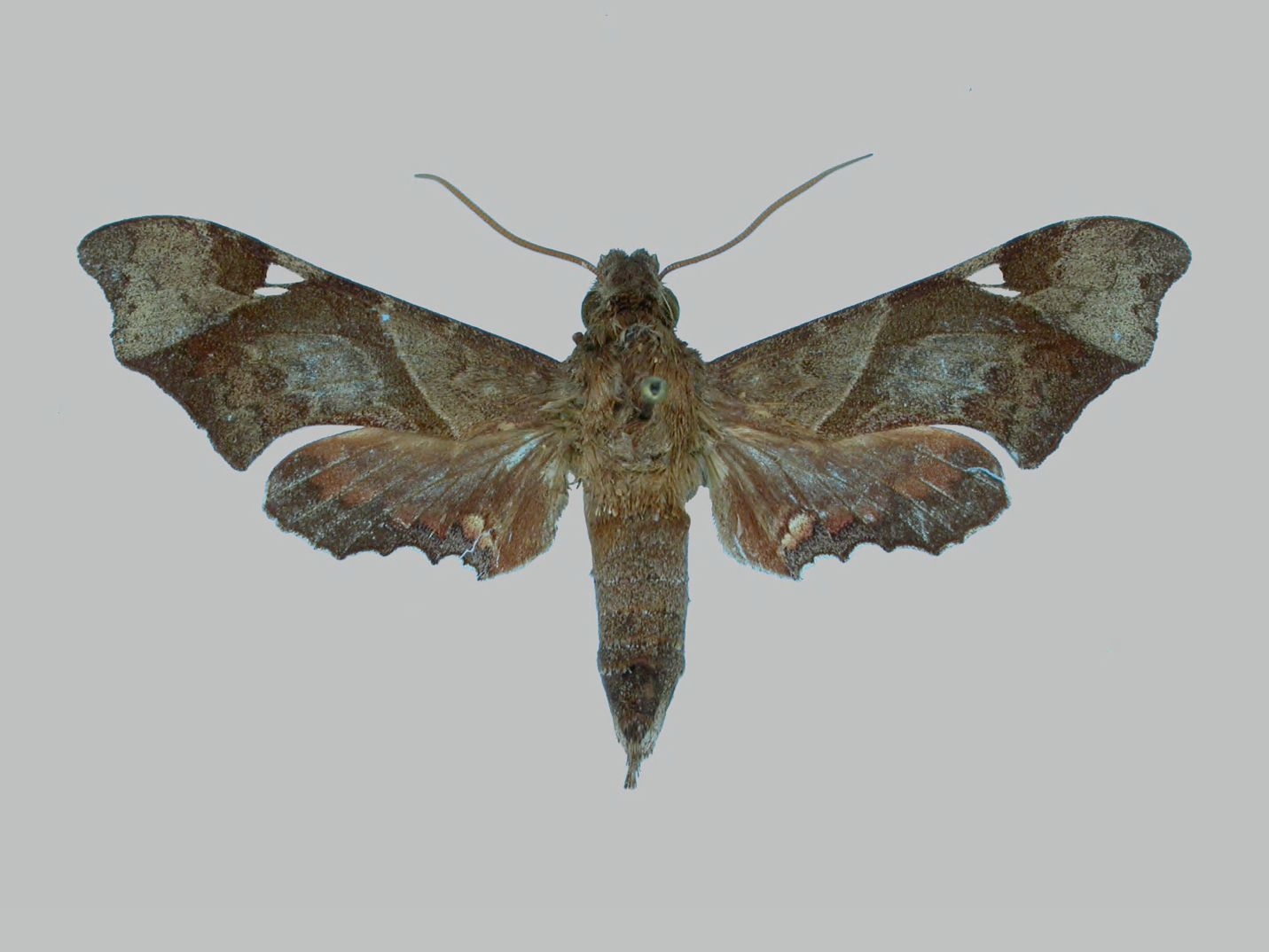

Scientific classification
- Kingdom: Animalia
- Phylum: Arthropoda
- Class: Insecta
- Order: Lepidoptera
- Family: Sphingidae
- Genus: Aleuron
- Species: A. ypanemae

Binomial name
- Aleuron ypanemae (Boisduval, [1875])

Synonyms
- Tylognathus ypanemae Boisduval, 1875

= Aleuron ypanemae =

Species of moth

Aleuron ypanemae is a moth of the family Sphingidae. It was described by Jean Baptiste Boisduval in 1875. It is known from Brazil.

There are probably multiple generations per year.

The larvae feed on Doliocarpus dentatus and Curatella americana, and probably also other Dilleniaceae species.
