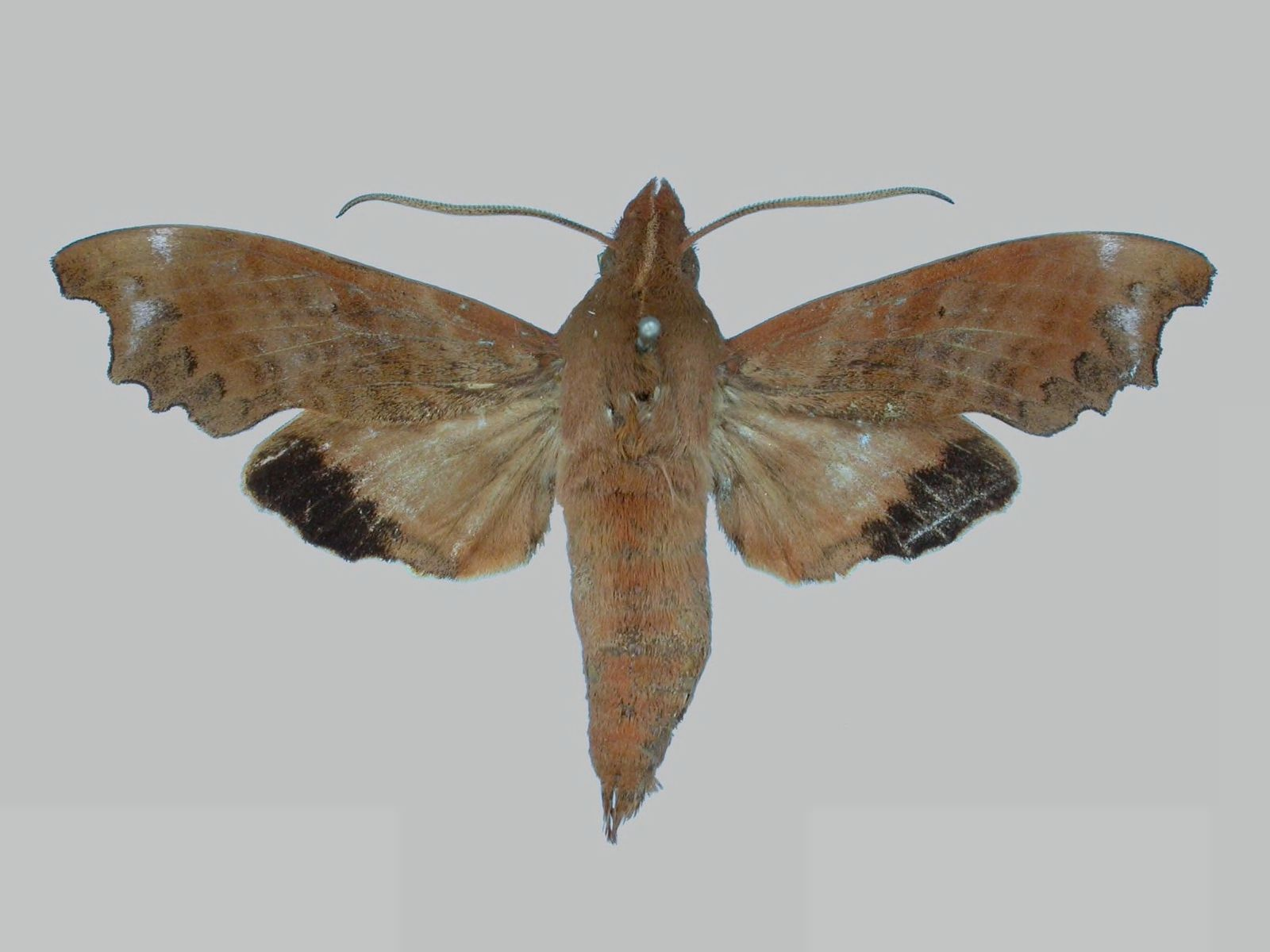
- Male

Scientific classification
- Kingdom: Animalia
- Phylum: Arthropoda
- Class: Insecta
- Order: Lepidoptera
- Family: Sphingidae
- Genus: Aleuron
- Species: A. prominens

Binomial name
- Aleuron prominens (Walker, 1856)

Synonyms
- Enyo prominens Walker, 1856; Tylognathus smerinthoides R. Felder, 1874; Aleuron smerinthoides (R. Felder, [1874]); Aleuron pudens Boisduval, [1875]

= Aleuron prominens =

Species of moth

Aleuron prominens is a moth of the family Sphingidae. It was described by Francis Walker in 1856. It is known from Brazil.

There are probably multiple generations per year.

The larvae have been recorded on Doliocarpus dentatus and Curatella americana, but probably also feed on other Dilleniaceae species.
