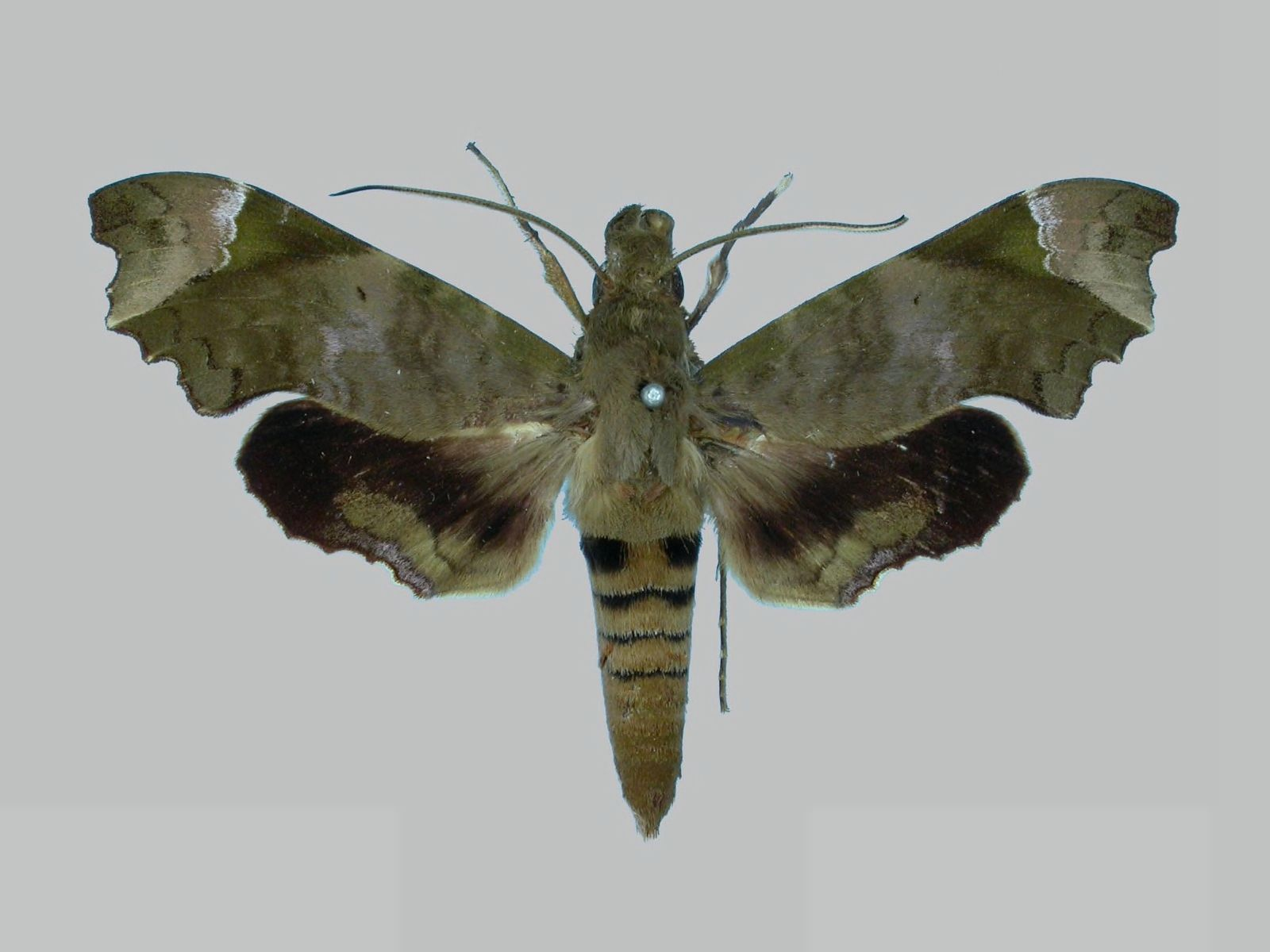
- Male

Scientific classification
- Domain: Eukaryota
- Kingdom: Animalia
- Phylum: Arthropoda
- Class: Insecta
- Order: Lepidoptera
- Family: Sphingidae
- Genus: Aleuron
- Species: A. cymographum

Binomial name
- Aleuron cymographum Rothschild & Jordan, 1903

= Aleuron cymographum =

Species of moth

Aleuron cymographum is a moth of the family Sphingidae. It was described by Rothschild and Jordan in 1903, and is known from Bolivia.

Adults are on wing from at least April to January.

The larvae probably feed on Curatella americana and other Dilleniaceae species.
