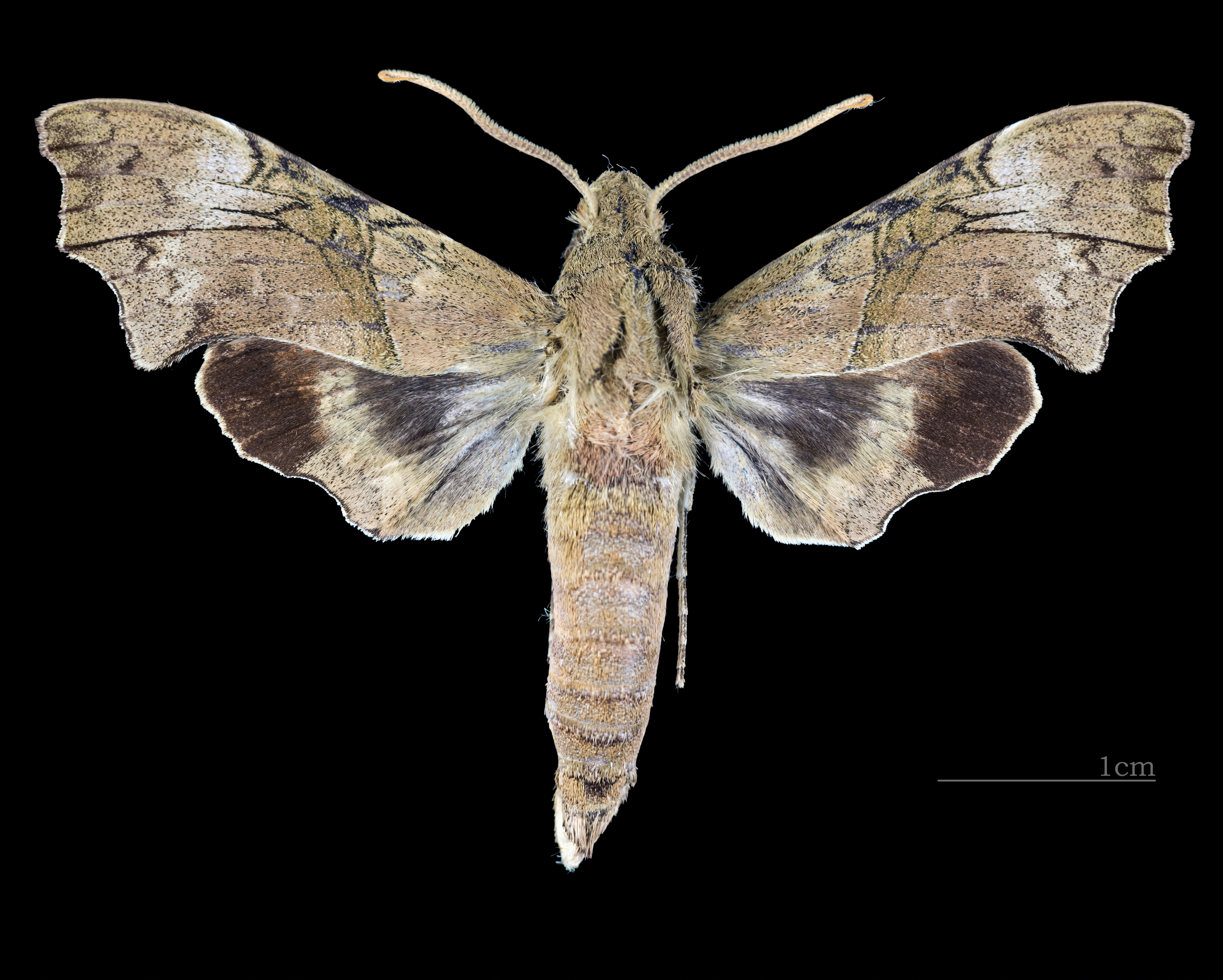
- Male dorsal
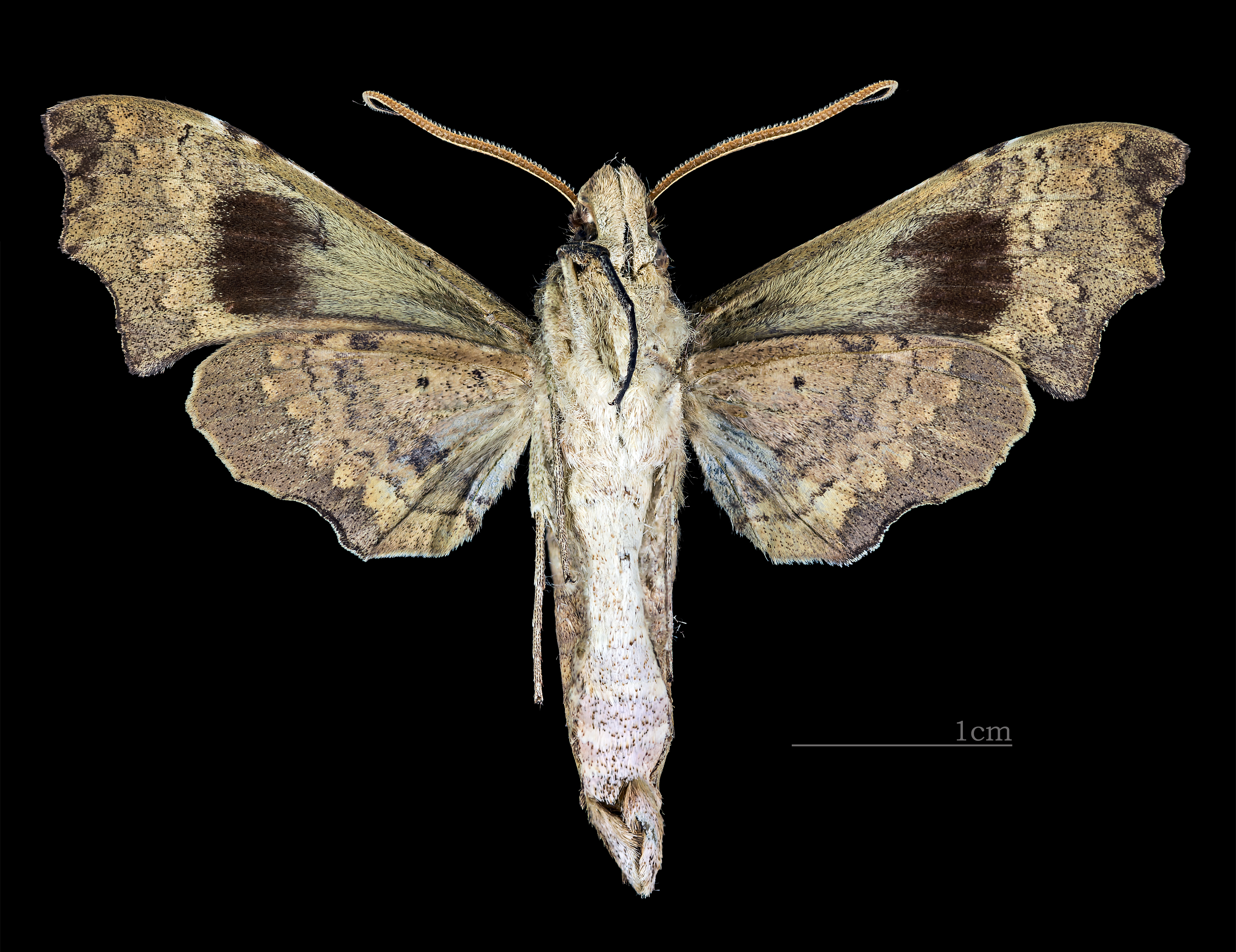
- Male ventral

Scientific classification
- Kingdom: Animalia
- Phylum: Arthropoda
- Clade: Pancrustacea
- Class: Insecta
- Order: Lepidoptera
- Family: Sphingidae
- Genus: Aleuron
- Species: A. neglectum

Binomial name
- Aleuron neglectum Rothschild and Jordan, 1903

Synonyms
- Rhodosoma flavidus Zhu & Wang, 1997; Aleuron flavidus (Zhu & Wang, 1997); Aleuron paraguayana Clark, 1931; Aleuron leo Clark, 1935

= Aleuron neglectum =

Species of moth

Aleuron neglectum is a moth of the family Sphingidae. It was described by Walter Rothschild and Karl Jordan in 1903.

== Distribution ==
It is found from Mexico, Belize, Guatemala, Costa Rica, south through the rest of Central America and much of South America, including northern, central and southern Venezuela to Peru, Bolivia, Brazil and Argentina. There is one record from China, but this is probably a misidentification or accidental import.

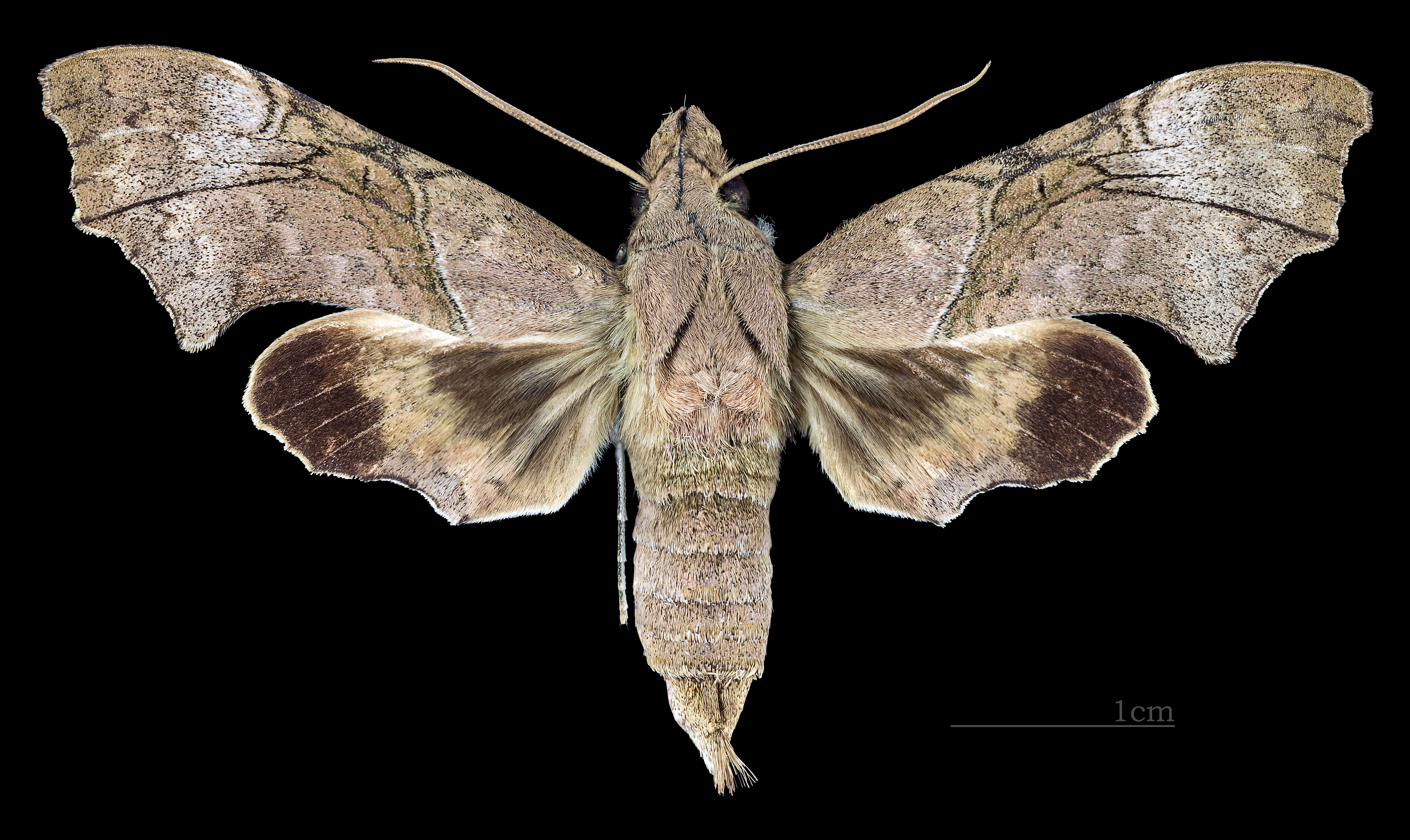
Female dorsal view

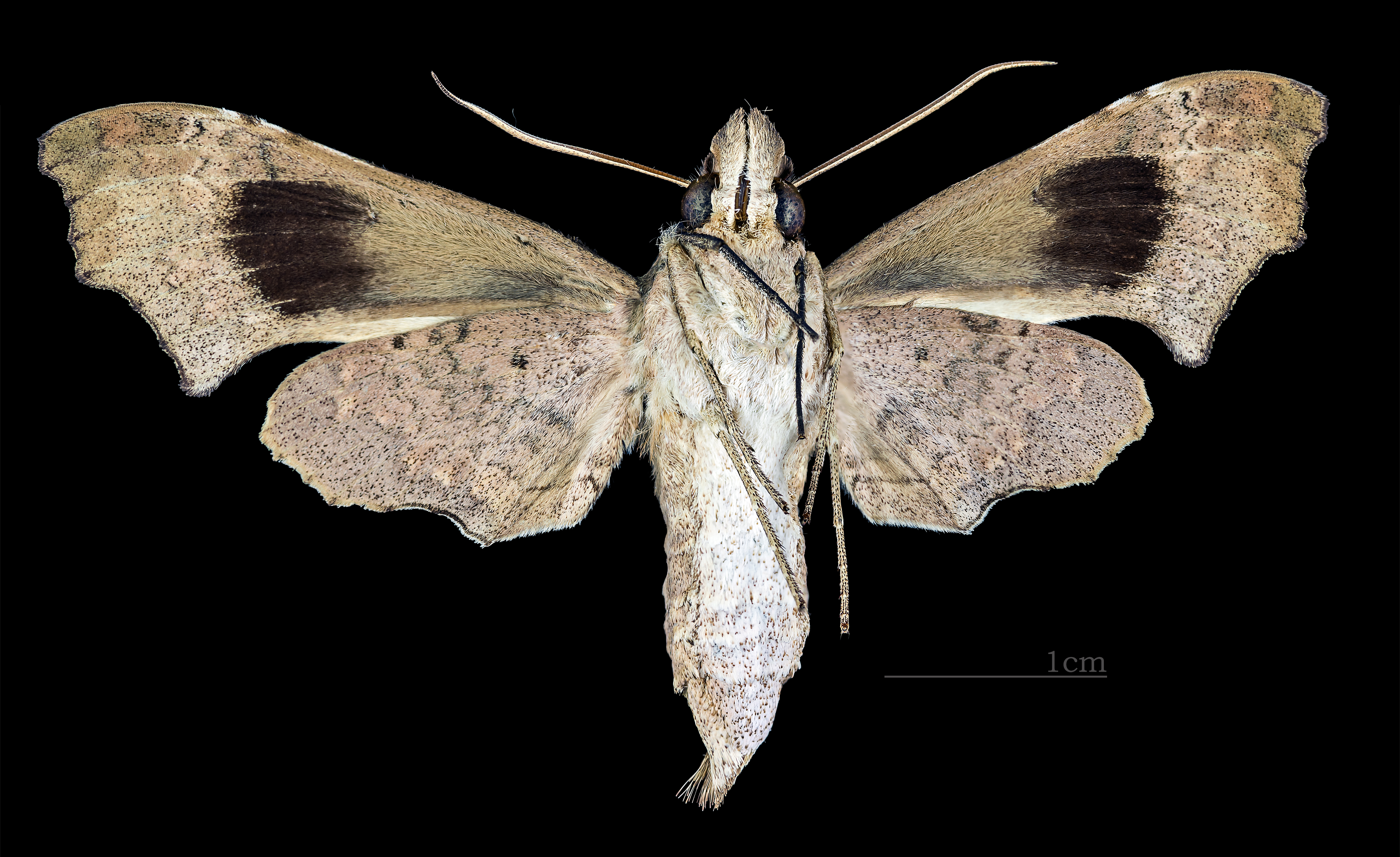
Female ventral view

== Biology ==
In French Guiana, adults are on wing in March, August and October. In Brazil, adults have been recorded in February and May. They visit puddles and frequently nectar at flowers of Duranta repens.

The larvae probably feed on Curatella americana and other members of family Dilleniaceae. They have also been reported feeding on Curatella, Doliocarpus, Davilla nitida and Tetracera.
