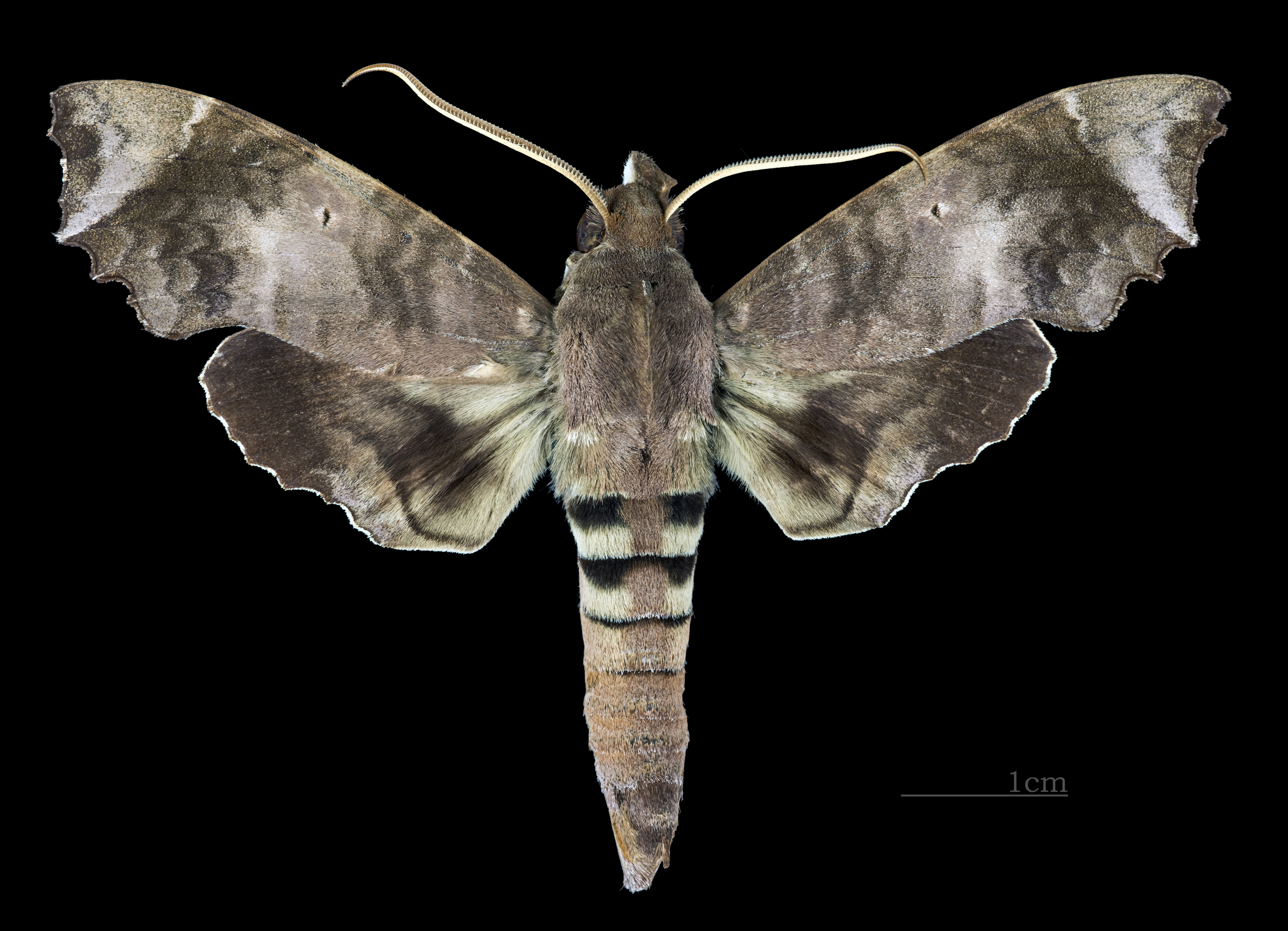
- Male
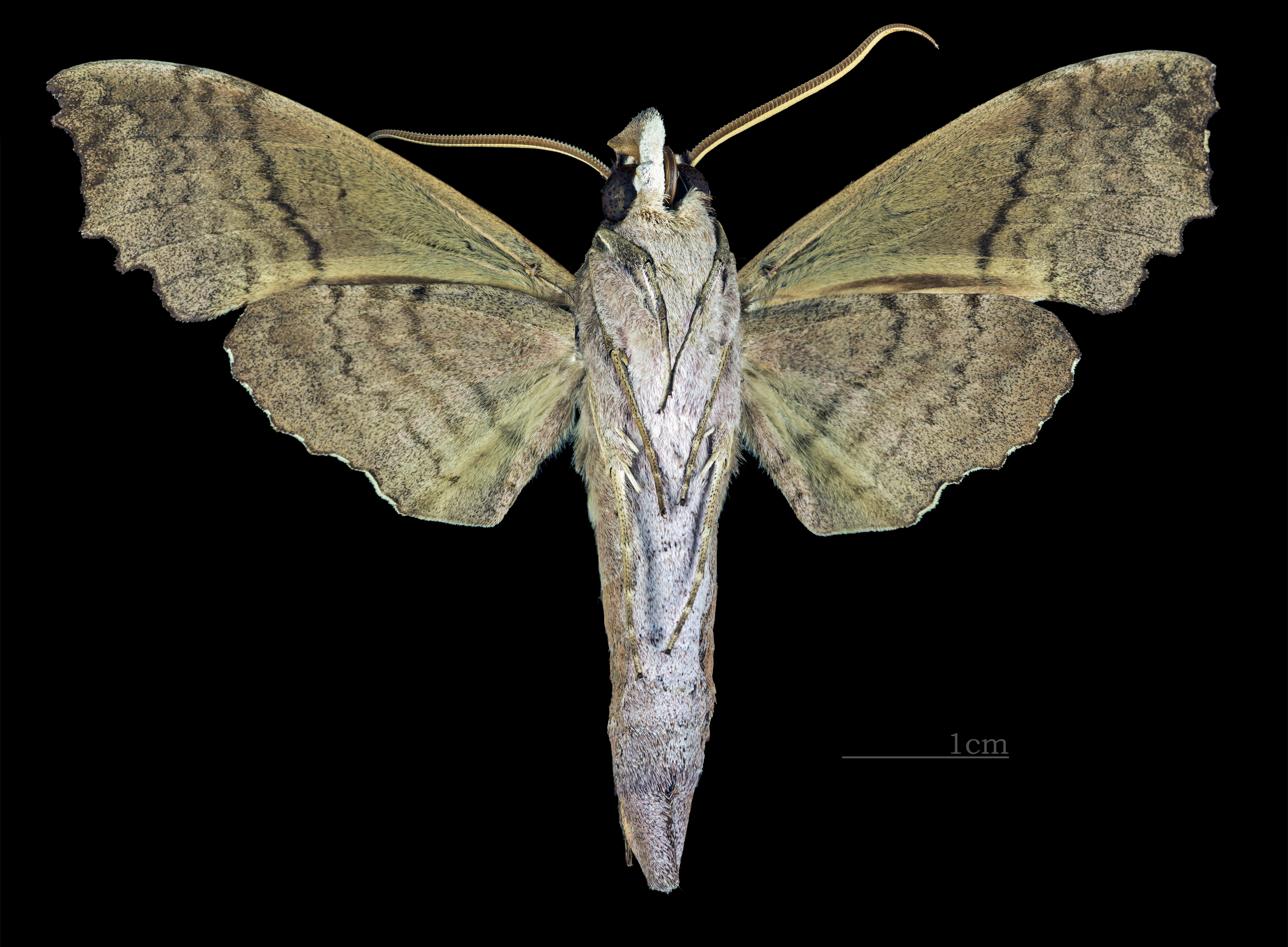
- Male underside

Scientific classification
- Kingdom: Animalia
- Phylum: Arthropoda
- Class: Insecta
- Order: Lepidoptera
- Family: Sphingidae
- Genus: Aleuron
- Species: A. carinata

Binomial name
- Aleuron carinata (Walker, 1856)

Synonyms
- Enyo carinata Walker, 1856; Gonenyo carinata; Aleuron carinatum; Tylognathus philampeloides Felder, 1874; Aleuron orophilos Boisduval, [1875]

= Aleuron carinata =

Species of moth

Aleuron carinata is a moth of the family Sphingidae. It was described by Francis Walker in 1856

== Distribution ==
Is known from southern Mexico, Panama, Venezuela, Brazil, Bolivia, Costa Rica, Belize and Ecuador.

== Description ==
The wingspan is 62–86 mm. Adults are on wing at least from July to January in Costa Rica and in June in Panama.

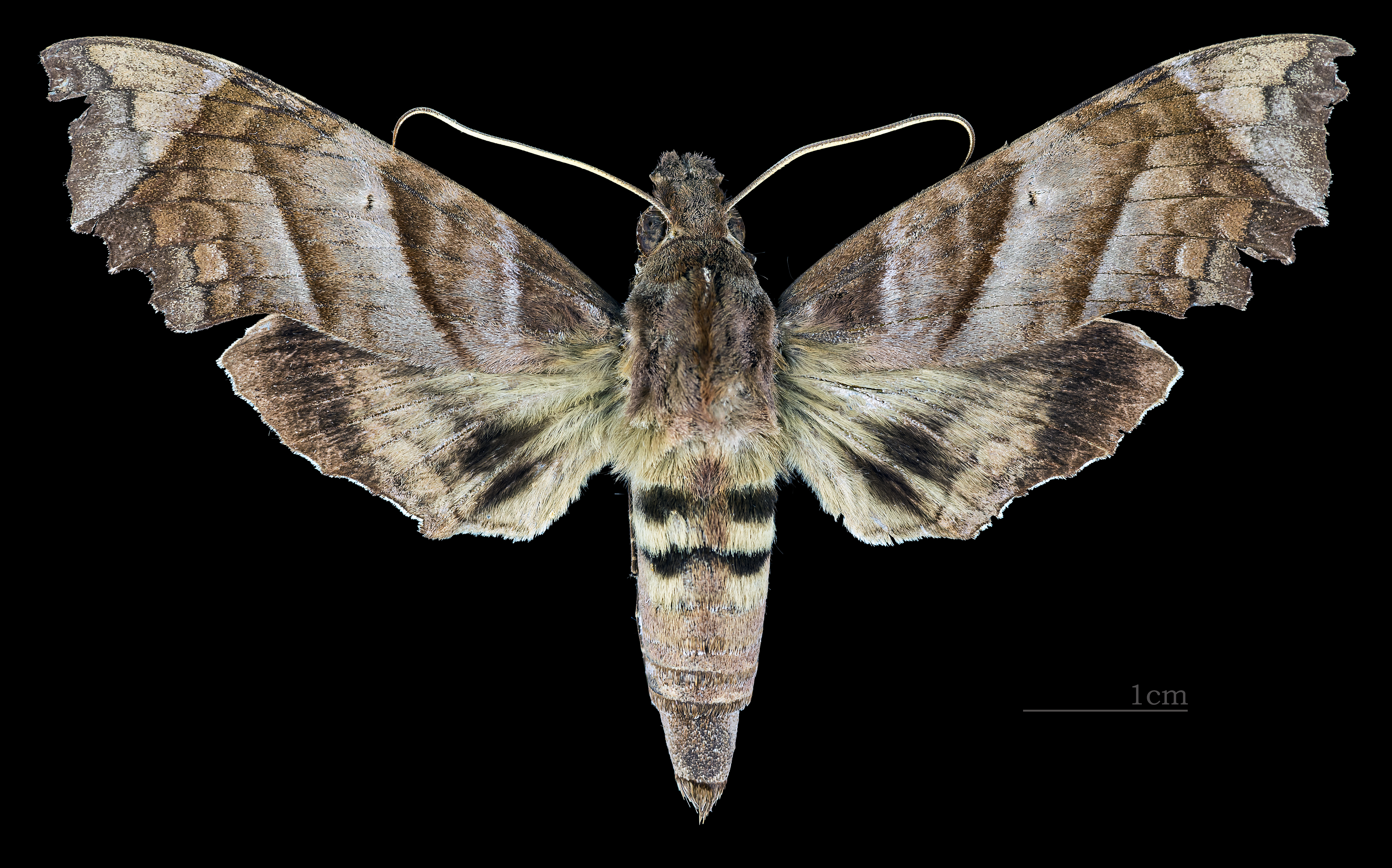
Female dorsal

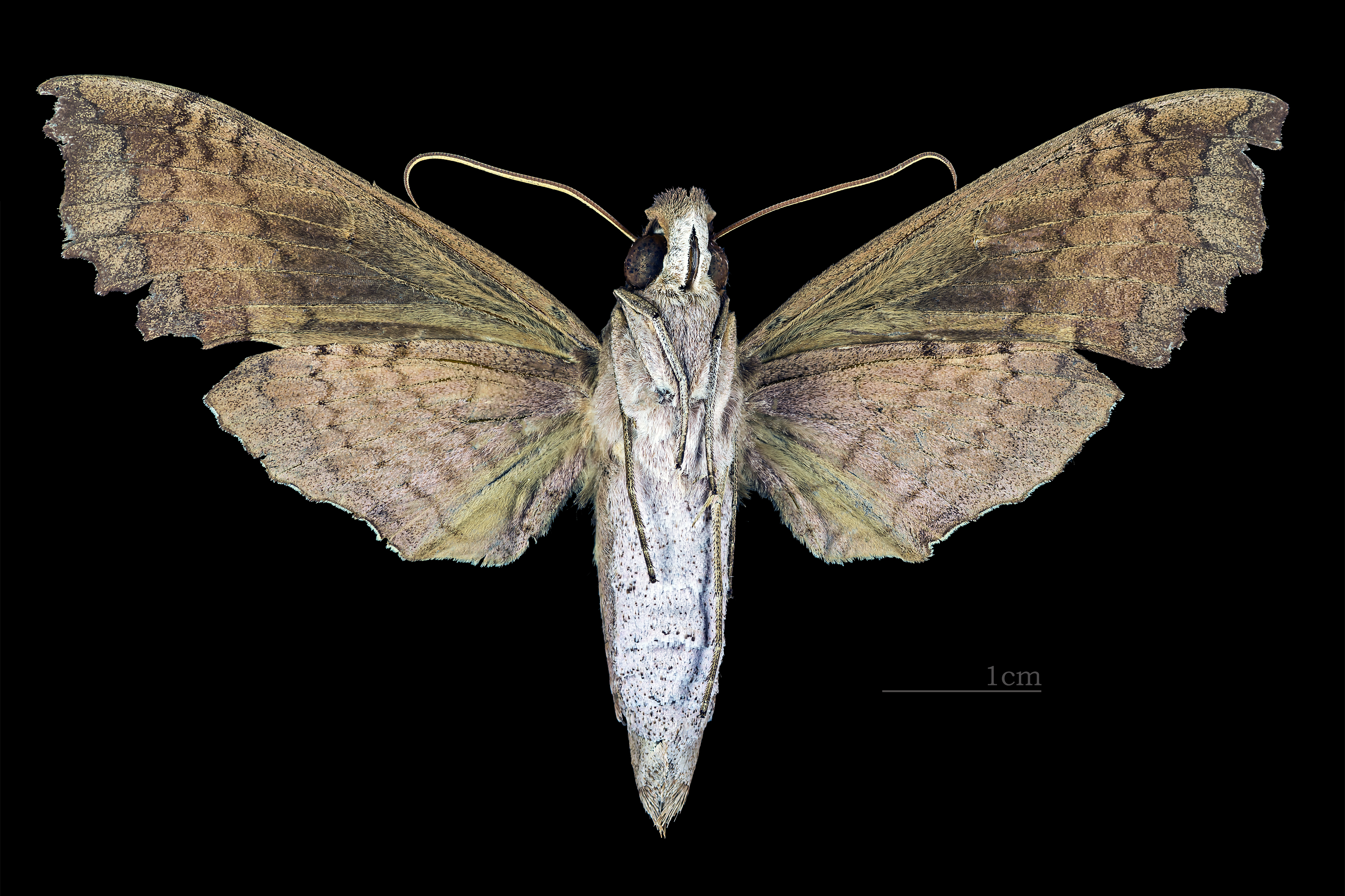
Female ventral

== Biology ==
The larvae feed on Doliocarpus dentatus, Curatella americana and probably other Dilleniaceae species.
