= Iphis (disambiguation) =

Iphis or Iphys, in Greek mythology, was the daughter of Telethusa and Ligdus in Crete.

Iphis may also refer to:

== Mythical/fictional character names ==
- Iphis (name), the name of eight characters in Greek mythology
- Iphis, the name used to refer to the daughter of Jephthah in early modern literature

== Literary works ==
- Iphis, an opera by Elena Kats-Chernin
- Iphis et Iante, a comedy by Isaac de Benserade

== In biology ==
- Iphis monarch, a species of bird
- Aleuron iphis, a species of moth
- Iphis casalis, a species of mite
- Coenonympha iphis, a species of butterfly
- Ogyris iphis, a species of butterfly in the genus Ogyris
- Culex iphis, a species of mosquito, see List of Culex species
- Pyrrochalcia iphis, a species of skippers in the genus Pyrrhochalcia
