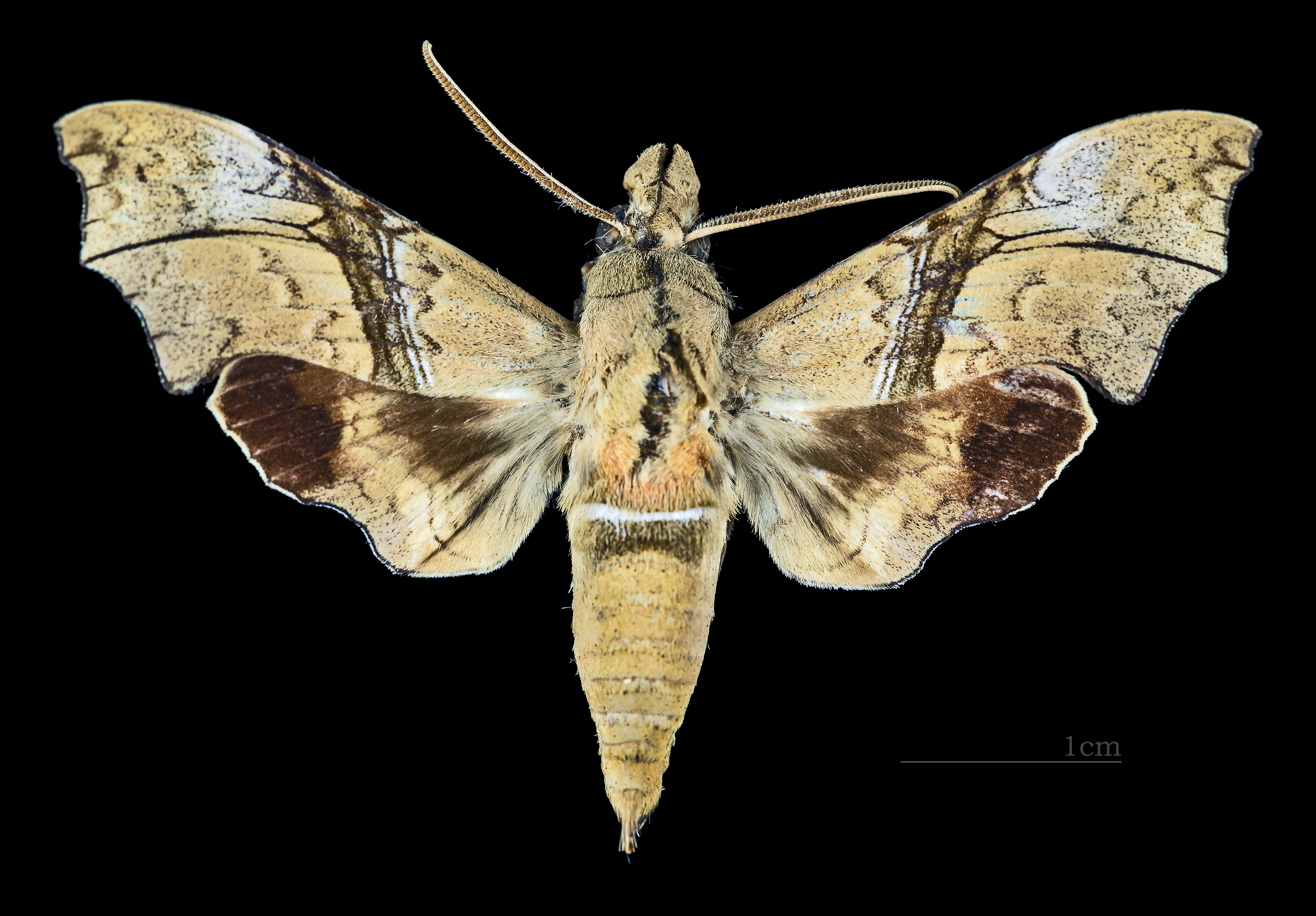
- Aleuron iphis male dorsal
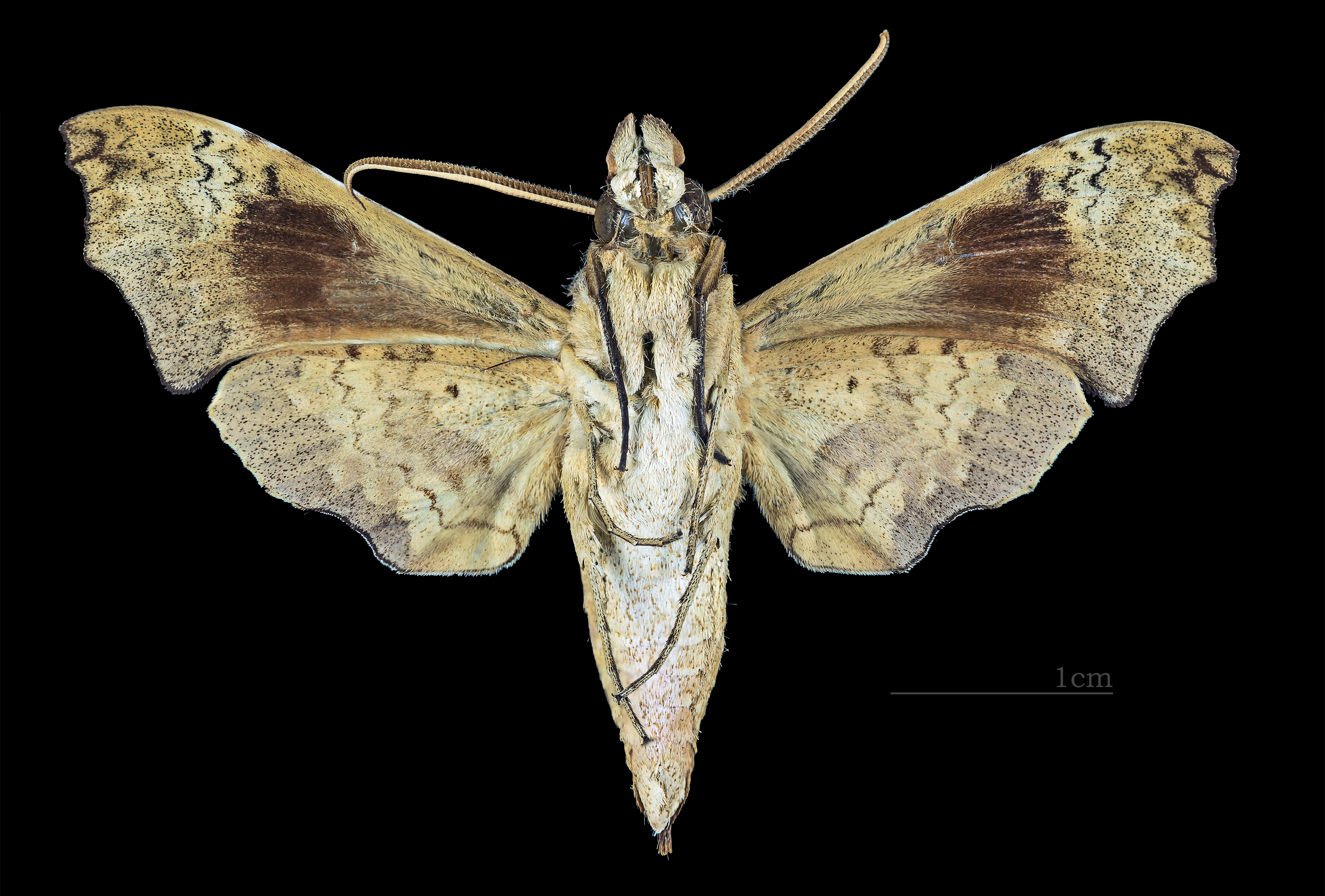
- Aleuron iphis male ventral

Scientific classification
- Kingdom: Animalia
- Phylum: Arthropoda
- Clade: Pancrustacea
- Class: Insecta
- Order: Lepidoptera
- Family: Sphingidae
- Genus: Aleuron
- Species: A. iphis

Binomial name
- Aleuron iphis (Walker, 1856)

Synonyms
- Enyo iphis Walker, 1856; Tylognathus scriptor R. Felder, [1874]; Calliomma volatica Clemens, 1859; Aleuron volatica (Clemens, 1859)

= Aleuron iphis =

Species of moth

Aleuron iphis is a moth of the family Sphingidae. It was described by Francis Walker in 1856

== Distribution ==
It is found from Mexico, Belize, Guatemala, Nicaragua, Costa Rica to Venezuela, Bolivia and Brazil.

== Description ==
The wingspan is 52–57 mm.

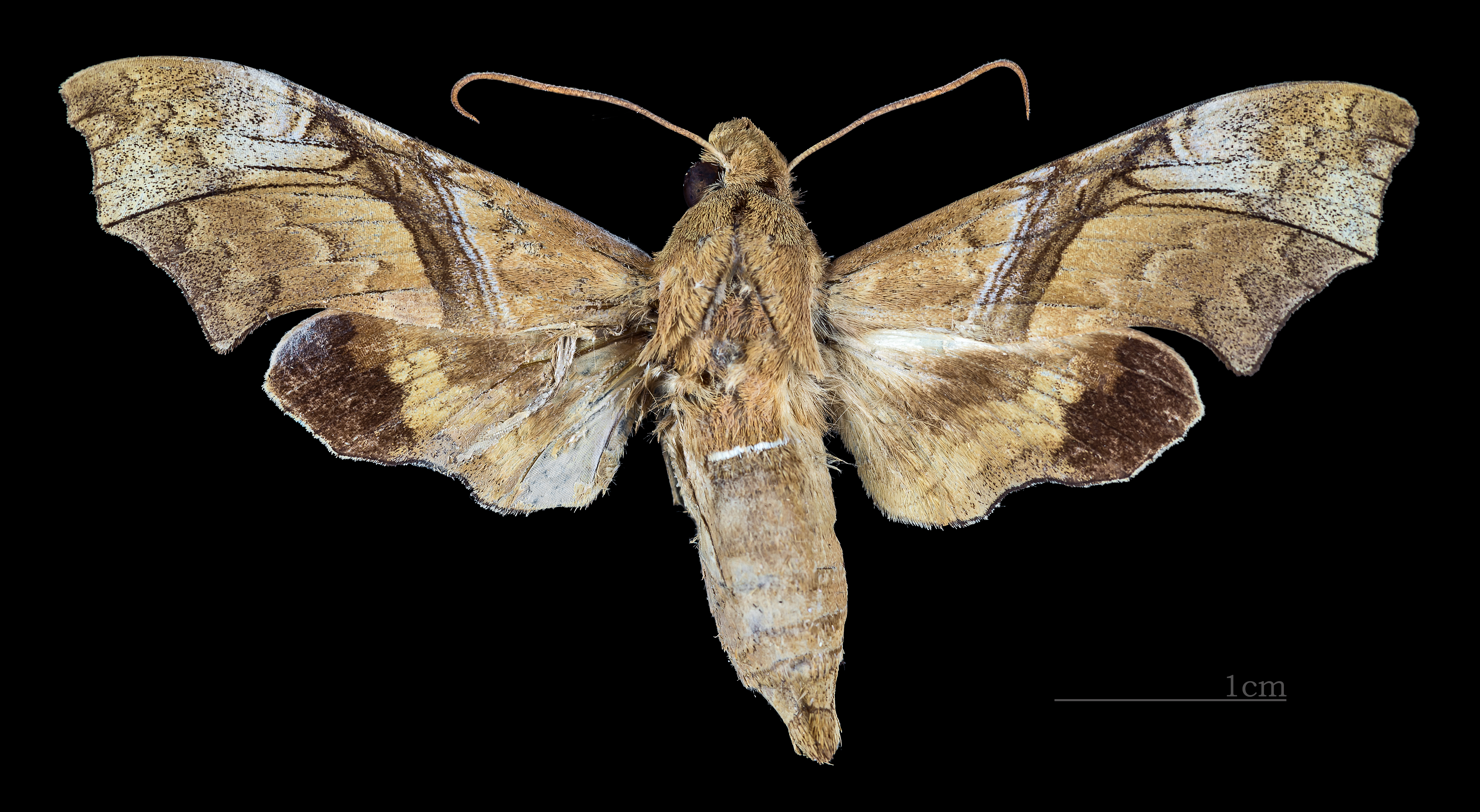
Female dorsal e
(coll.MHNT)

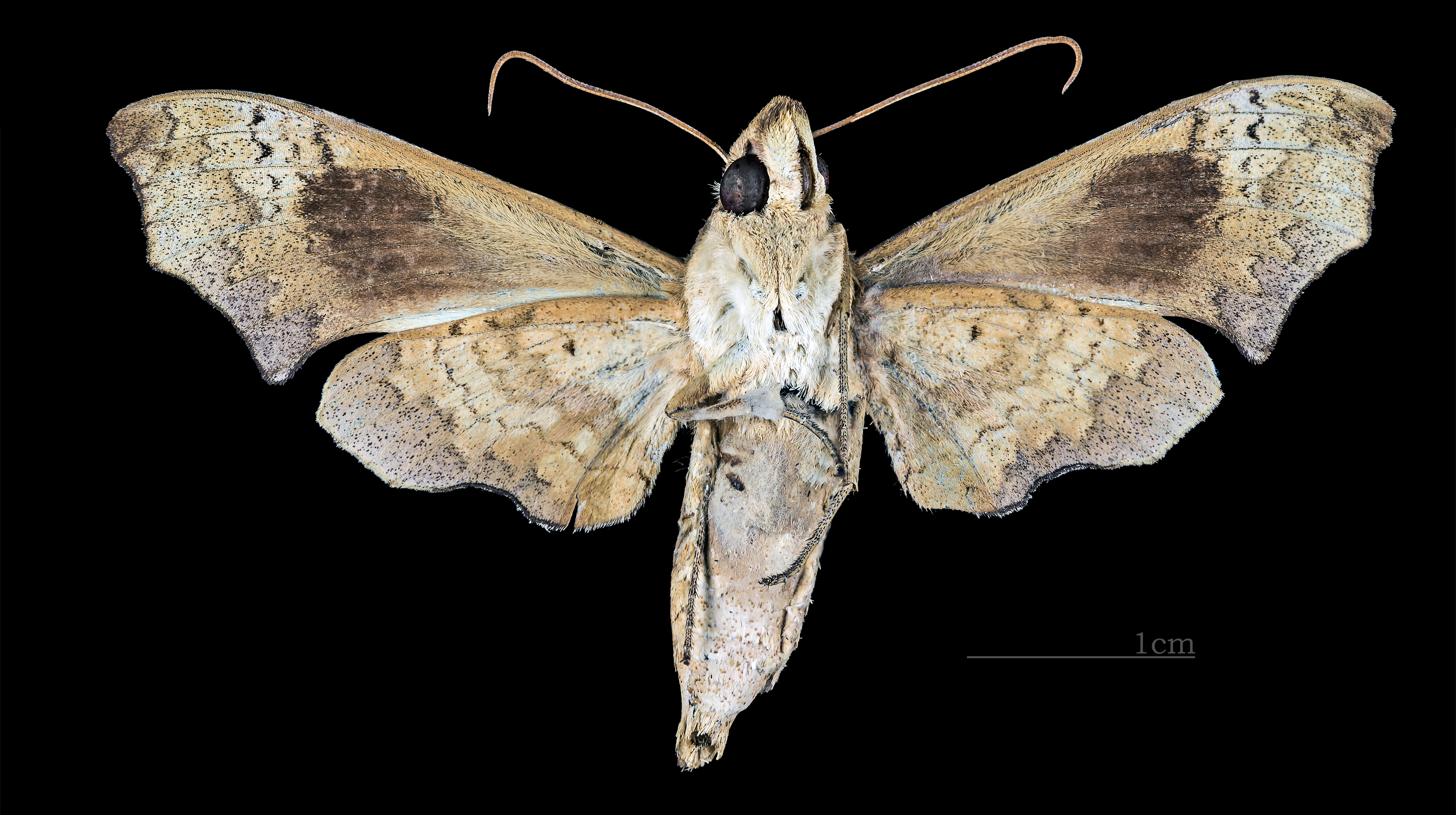
Female ventral
(coll.MHNT)

== Biology ==
- Adults are on wing from at least July to January in Costa Rica.
- The larvae feed on Tetracera volubilis, Curatella americana and probably other Dilleniaceae species.
