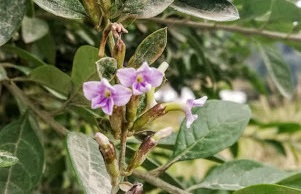

Scientific classification
- Kingdom: Plantae
- Clade: Tracheophytes
- Clade: Angiosperms
- Clade: Eudicots
- Clade: Asterids
- Order: Lamiales
- Family: Verbenaceae
- Genus: Duranta
- Species: D. mutisii

Binomial name
- Duranta mutisii L.f.

Synonyms
- Duranta boekei Moldenke; Duranta macrocarpa Kunth; Duranta mutisiana Sm.; Duranta mutisii f. serrulata Moldenke; Duranta parietariifolia Juss. ex Walp.; Duranta phytolaccifolia Juss. ex Schau.; Duranta recurvistachys Rusby

= Duranta mutisii =

Species of plant

Duranta mutisii, commonly known as espino in Spanish, is a shrub of the family Verbenaceae that is found in South America.

== Description ==
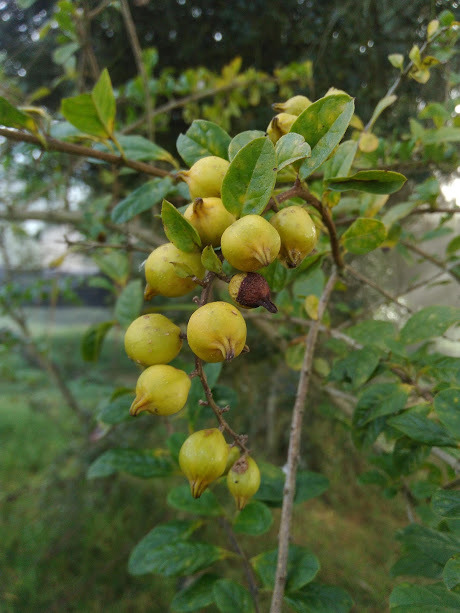
Fruits.

It is a shrub that can reach 8 meters high, with more or less dense foliage, has an irregular crown, with abundant branching and subquadrangular branches. Its leaves are simple opposite, with an entire border, smooth, leathery, with an acute apex and cuneate base, without stipules and without exudate. The spines are opposite and curved. The flowers are light blue, tubular, grouped in axillary inflorescences in the form of a cluster. The fruits are yellow, round, apiculated, with yellow pulp and each contains one seed.

== Distribution ==
It is distributed in South America at an altitude of 1800 to 3000 meters above sea level, in the following countries: Colombia, Ecuador, Peru and Venezuela.

== Uses ==
It serves as food for a great diversity of native fauna; its flowers and fruits serve as food for insects and birds, its leaves are food of diverse amount of larvae, for example the larvae of Rothschildia aricia that produce silk. The plant is also used to counteract deforestation, use in fences and also as ornamental in parks.
