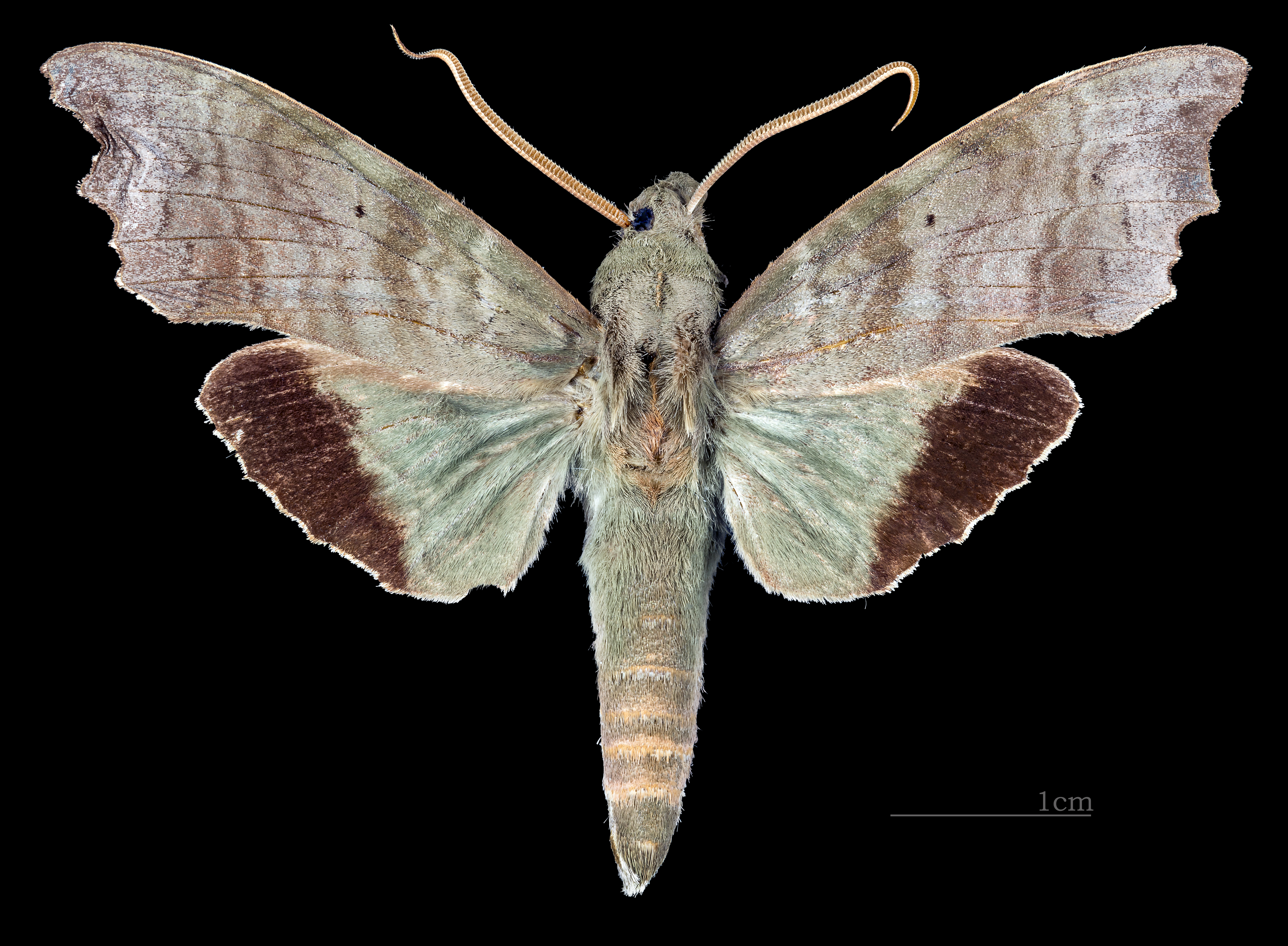
- Male Aleuron chloroptera

Scientific classification
- Kingdom: Animalia
- Phylum: Arthropoda
- Clade: Pancrustacea
- Class: Insecta
- Order: Lepidoptera
- Family: Sphingidae
- Subfamily: Macroglossinae
- Tribe: Dilophonotini
- Subtribe: Dilophonotina
- Genus: Aleuron; Boisduval, 1870

Species
- See text

Synonyms
- Tylognathus R. Felder, 1874; Callenyo Grote, 1874; Gonenyo Butler, 1874

= Aleuron =

Genus of moths

Aleuron is a genus of moths in the family Sphingidae first described by Jean Baptiste Boisduval in 1870.

== Species ==
- Aleuron carinata (Walker 1856)
- Aleuron chloroptera (Perty 1833)
- Aleuron cymographum Rothschild & Jordan 1903
- Aleuron iphis (Walker 1856)
- Aleuron neglectum Rothschild & Jordan 1903
- Aleuron prominens (Walker 1856)
- Aleuron ypanemae (Boisduval 1875)
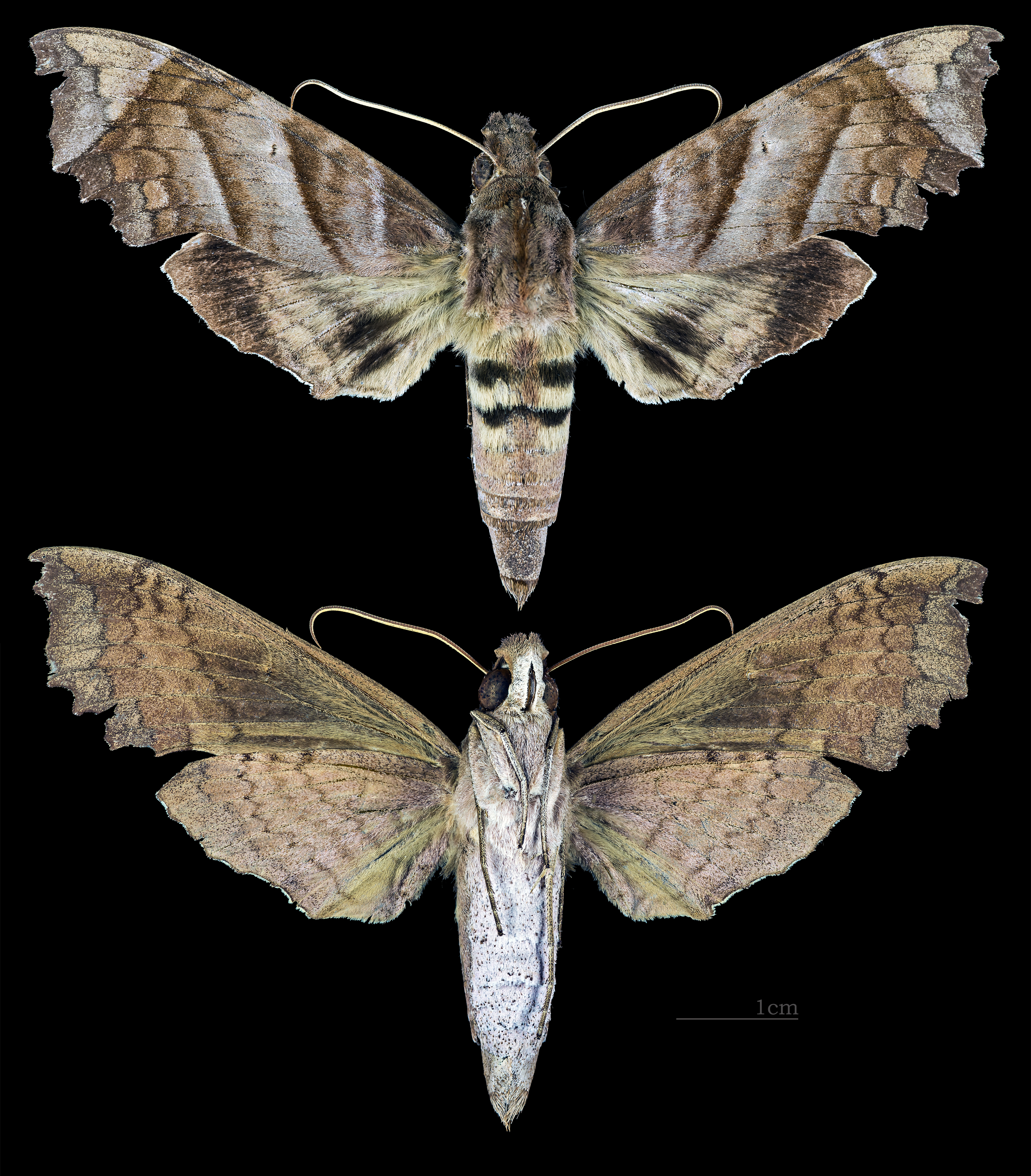
Aleuron carinata

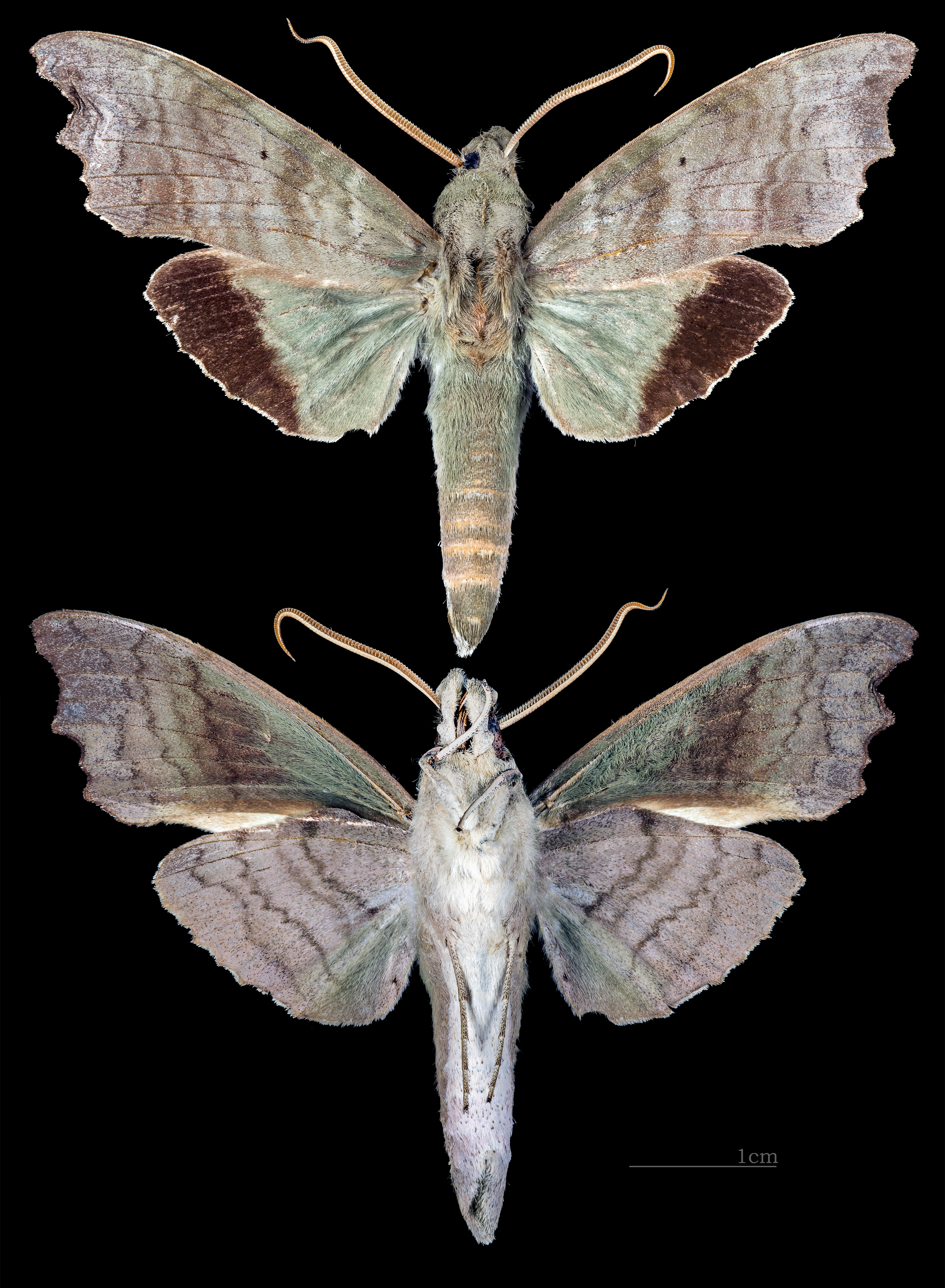
Aleuron chloroptera

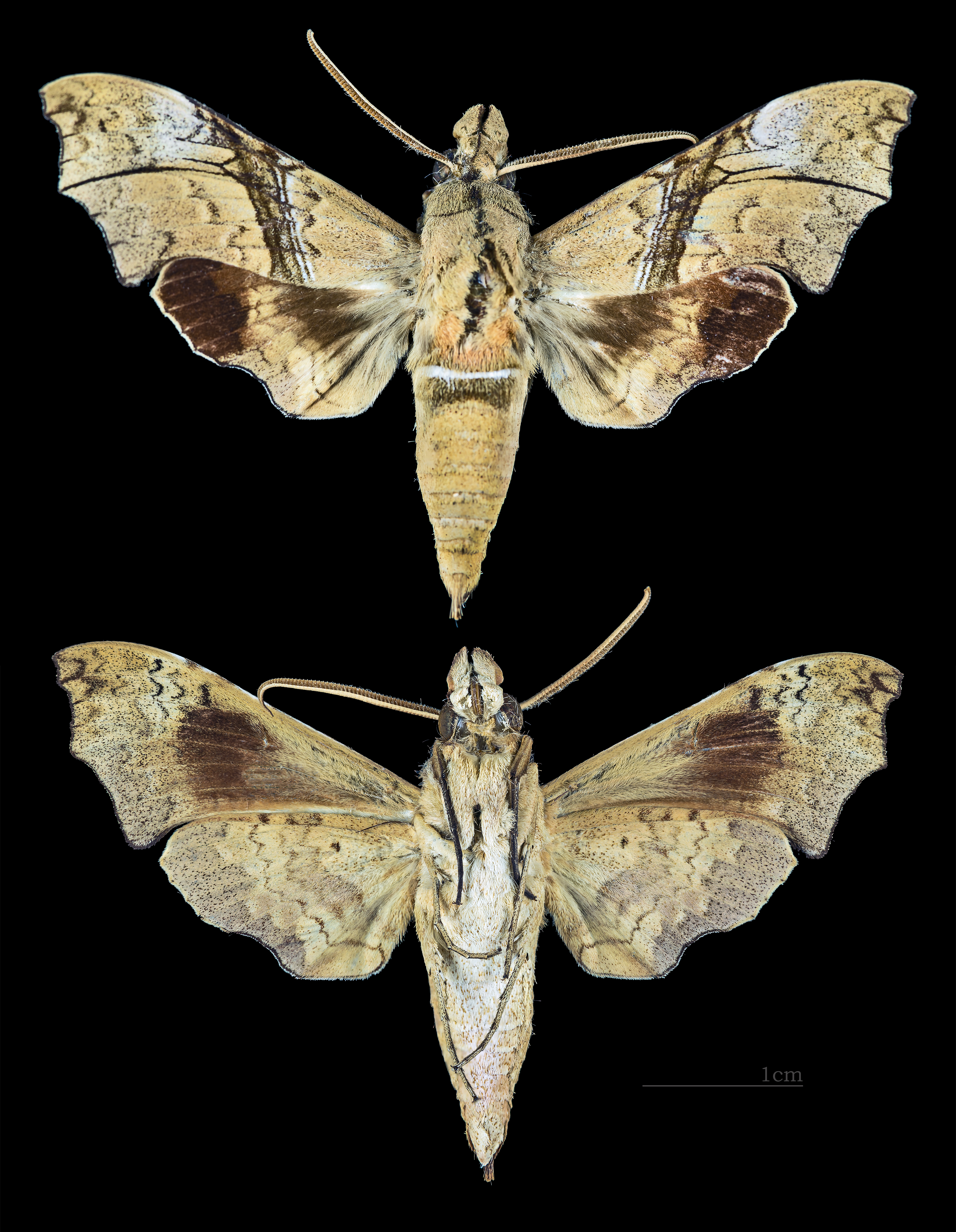
Aleuron iphis

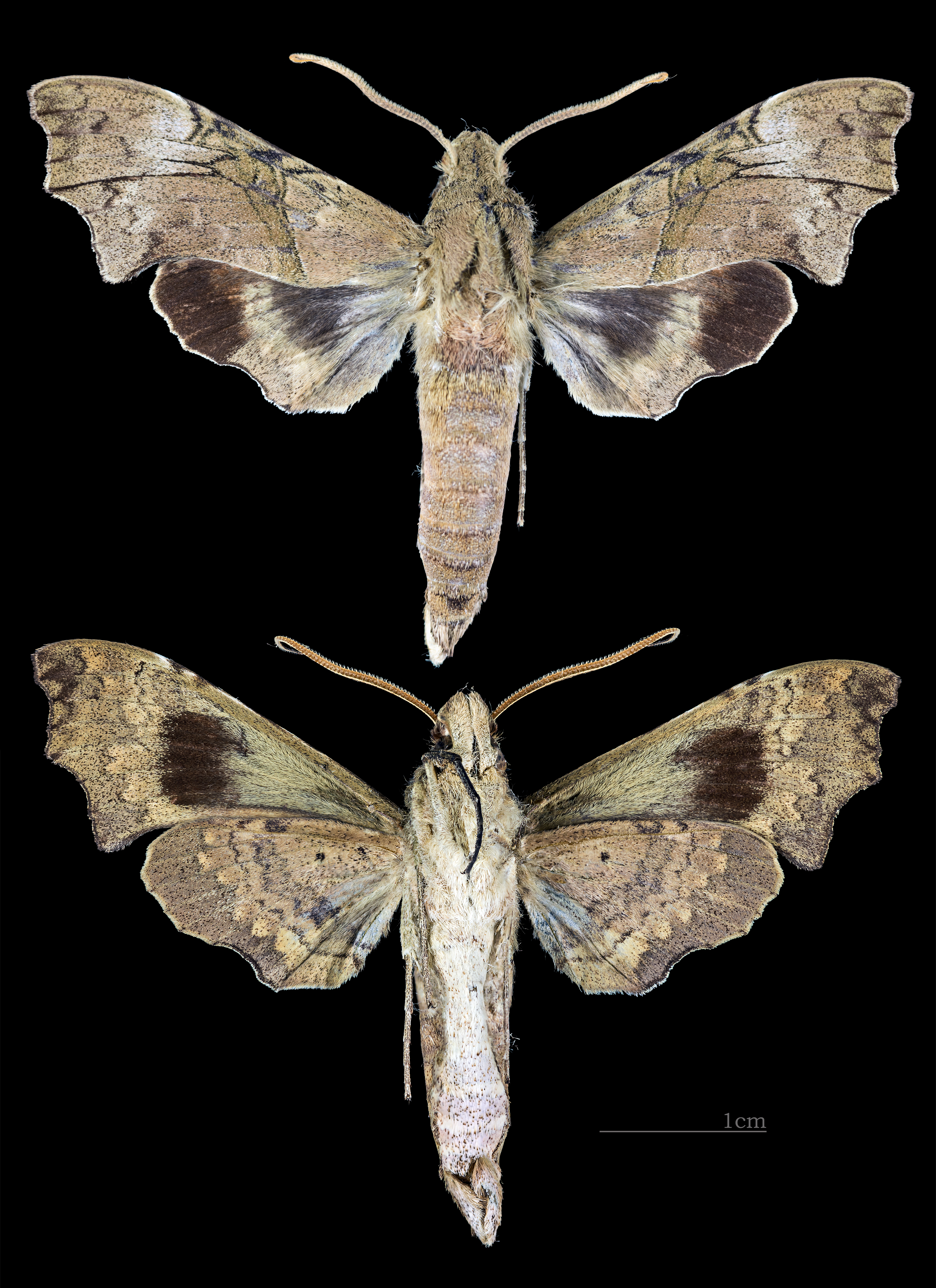
Aleuron neglectum
