= Duranta serratifolia =

- Duranta serratifolia in Jardin des Plantes de Tolouse

Scientific classification
- Kingdom: Plantae
- Clade: Tracheophytes
- Clade: Angiosperms
- Clade: Eudicots
- Clade: Asterids
- Order: Lamiales
- Family: Verbenaceae
- Genus: Duranta
- Species: D. serratifolia

Binomial name
- Duranta serratifolia (Griseb.) Kuntze

Species of plant

Duranta serratifolia is a species of flowering plant in the family Verbenaceae. It is native to Bolivia and northwest Argentina.
