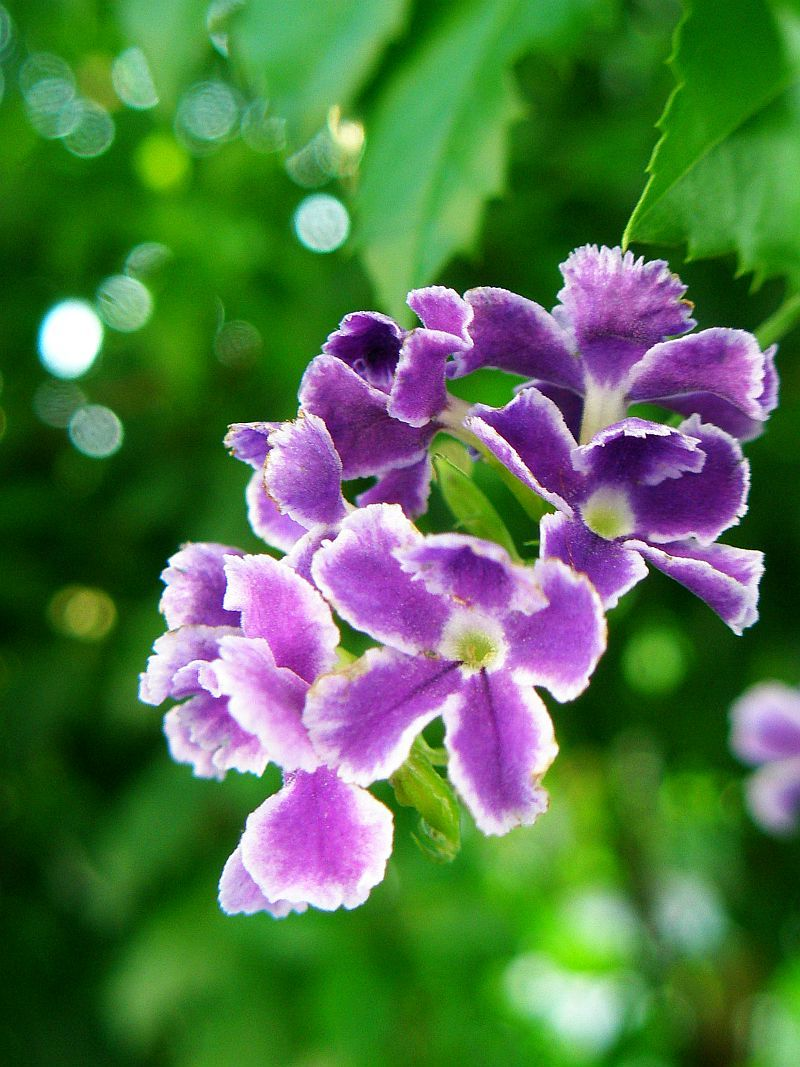

Scientific classification
- Kingdom: Plantae
- Clade: Tracheophytes
- Clade: Angiosperms
- Clade: Eudicots
- Clade: Asterids
- Order: Lamiales
- Family: Verbenaceae
- Genus: Duranta; L.

Species
- Duranta dombeyana; Duranta erecta; Duranta mutisii; Duranta serratifolia; Duranta stenostachya; Duranta triacantha

= Duranta =

Genus of flowering plants

Duranta is a genus of flowering plants in the verbena family, Verbenaceae. It contains 17 species of shrubs and small trees that are native from southern Florida to Mexico and South America. They are commonly cultivated as hedges and ornamental plants.

Duranta is registered as an invasive weed by many councils of Australia. It is a prolific, fast growing weed that is spread by birds from domestic areas to natural reserves. It was introduced and marketed as a hedge plant some years ago. Many people now fight to keep this thorny pest under control. It is highly ranked in the most invasive weeds in Australia.

== Selected species ==
- Duranta dombeyana Moldenke
- Duranta erecta L.
- Duranta mutisii
- Duranta serratifolia (Griseb.) Kuntze
- Duranta stenostachya Tod.
- Duranta triacantha Juss.

== Gallery ==
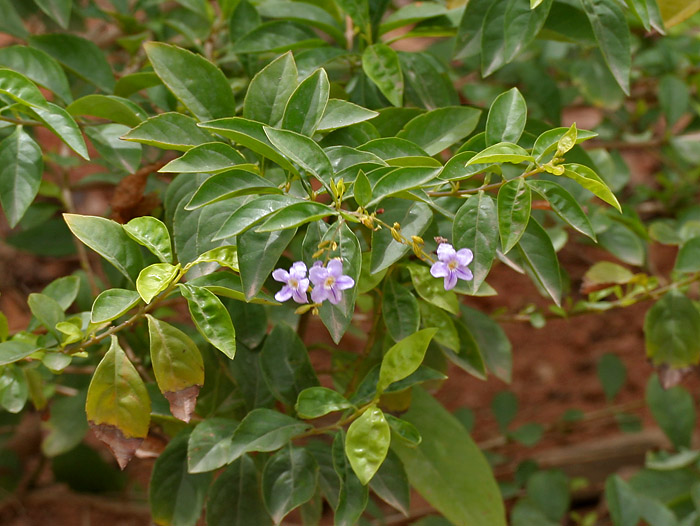
Duranta erecta in Hyderabad, India.

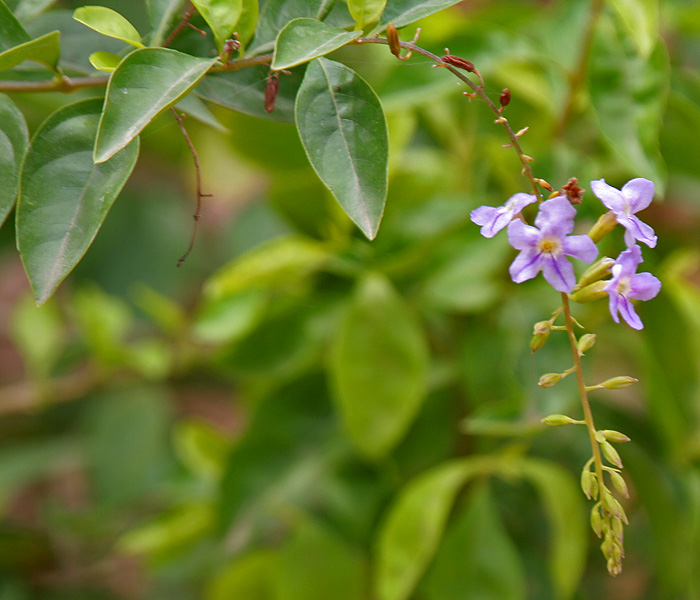
Duranta erecta in Hyderabad, India.

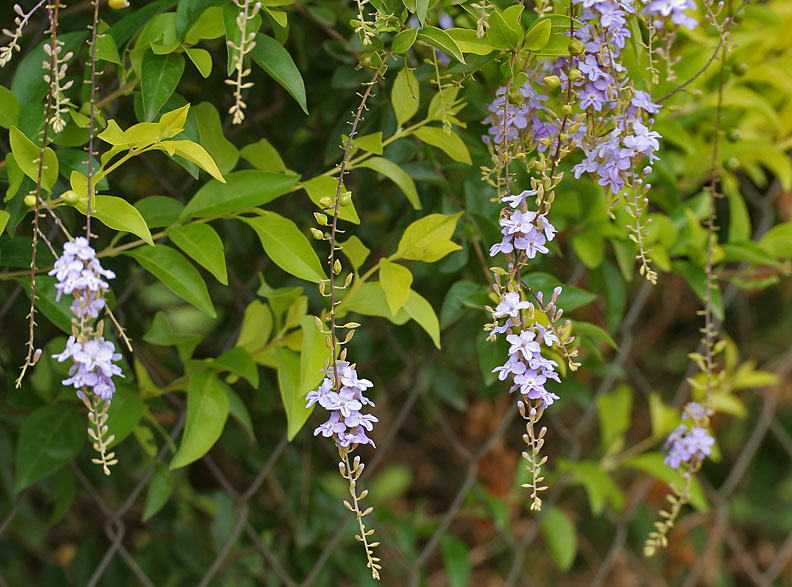
Duranta erecta at Ananthagiri Hills, in Rangareddy district of Andhra Pradesh, India.

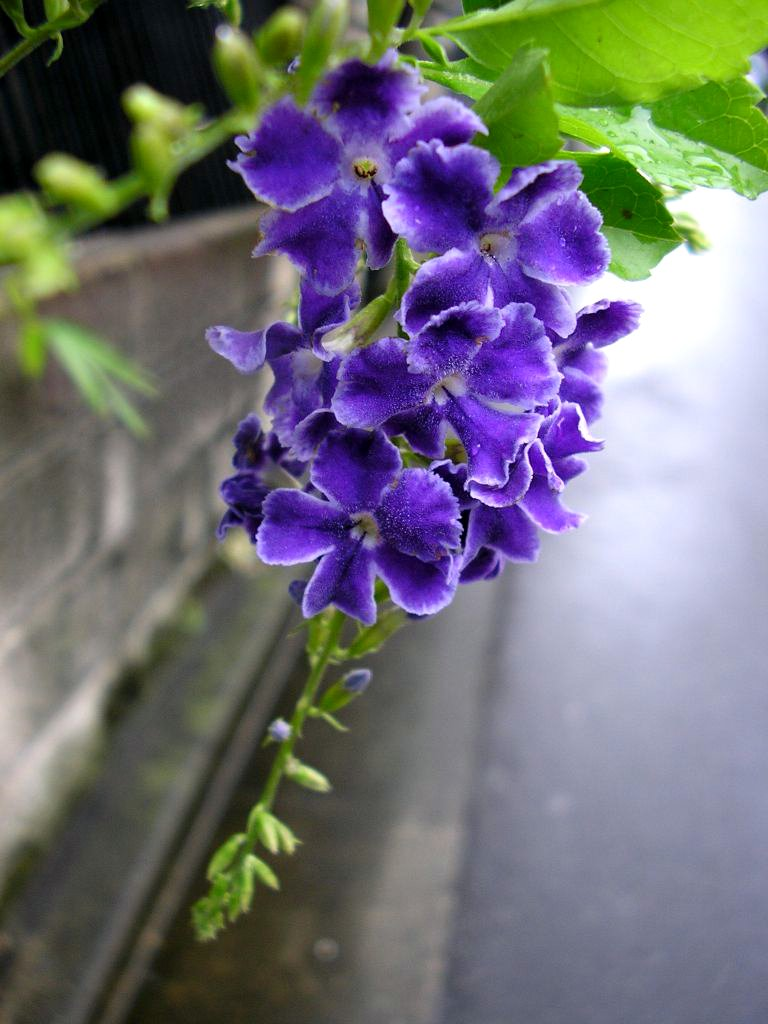

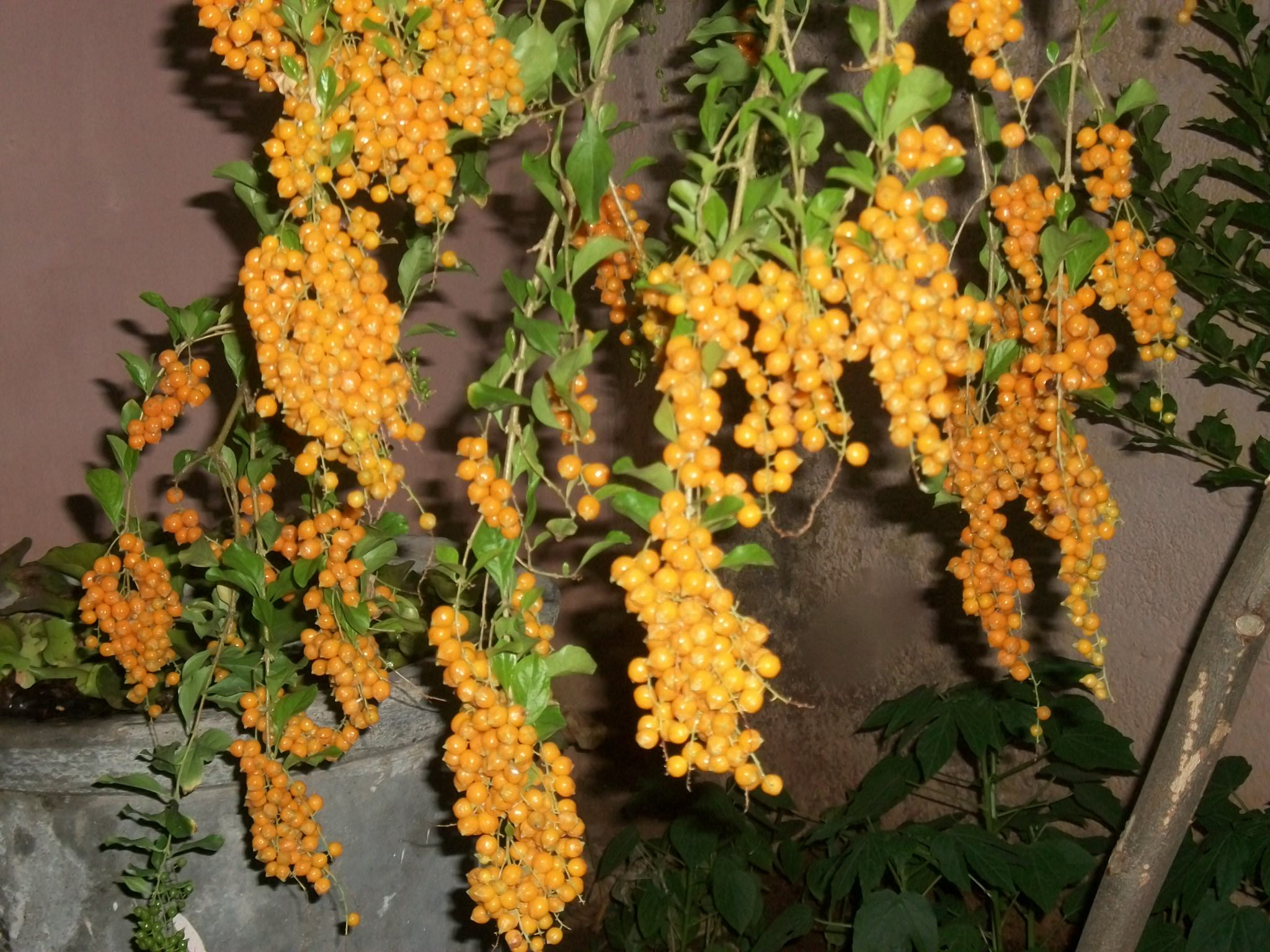
Fruits of duranta

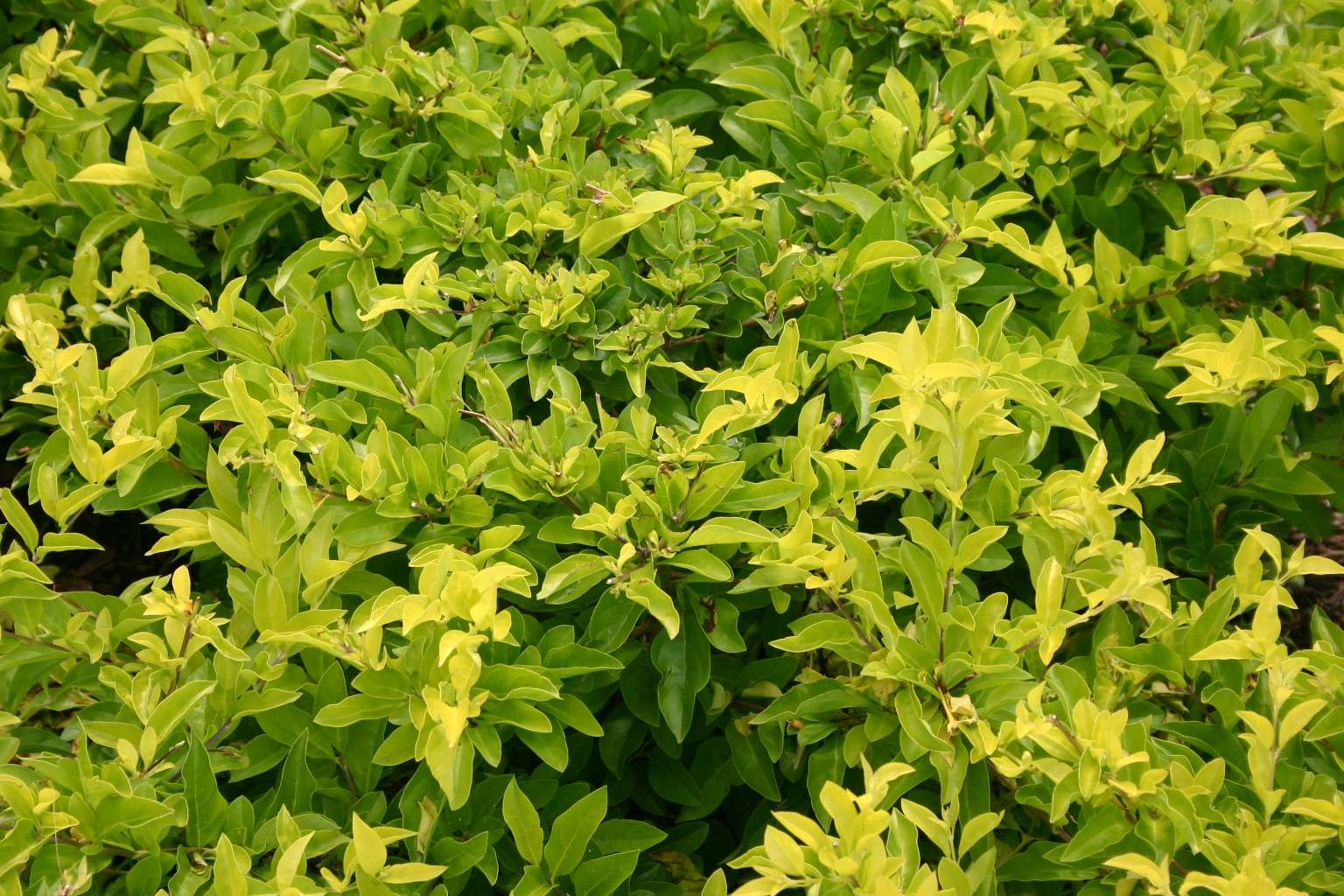
Golden Duranta (Sheena's Gold)

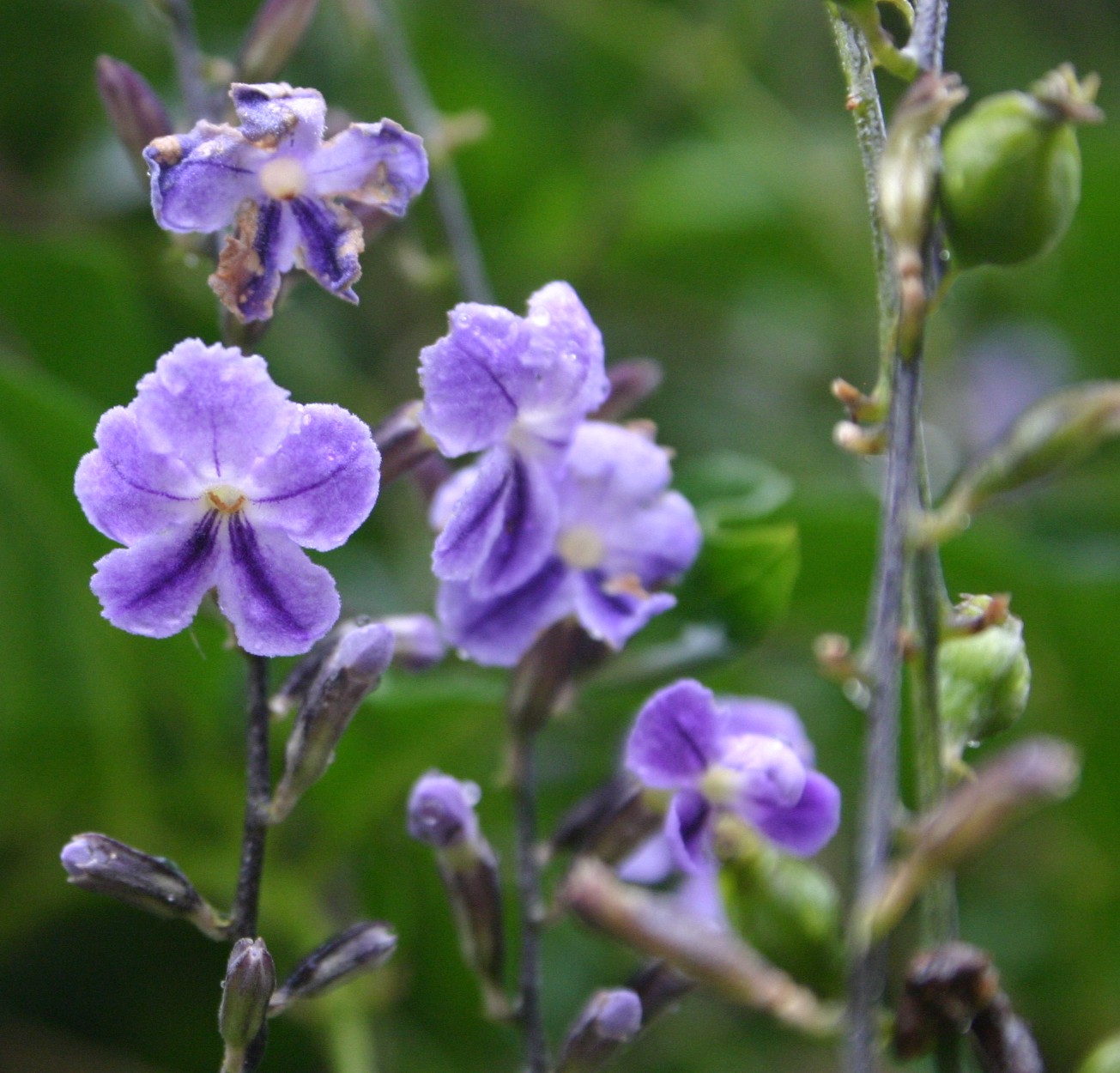
Duranta repens L.

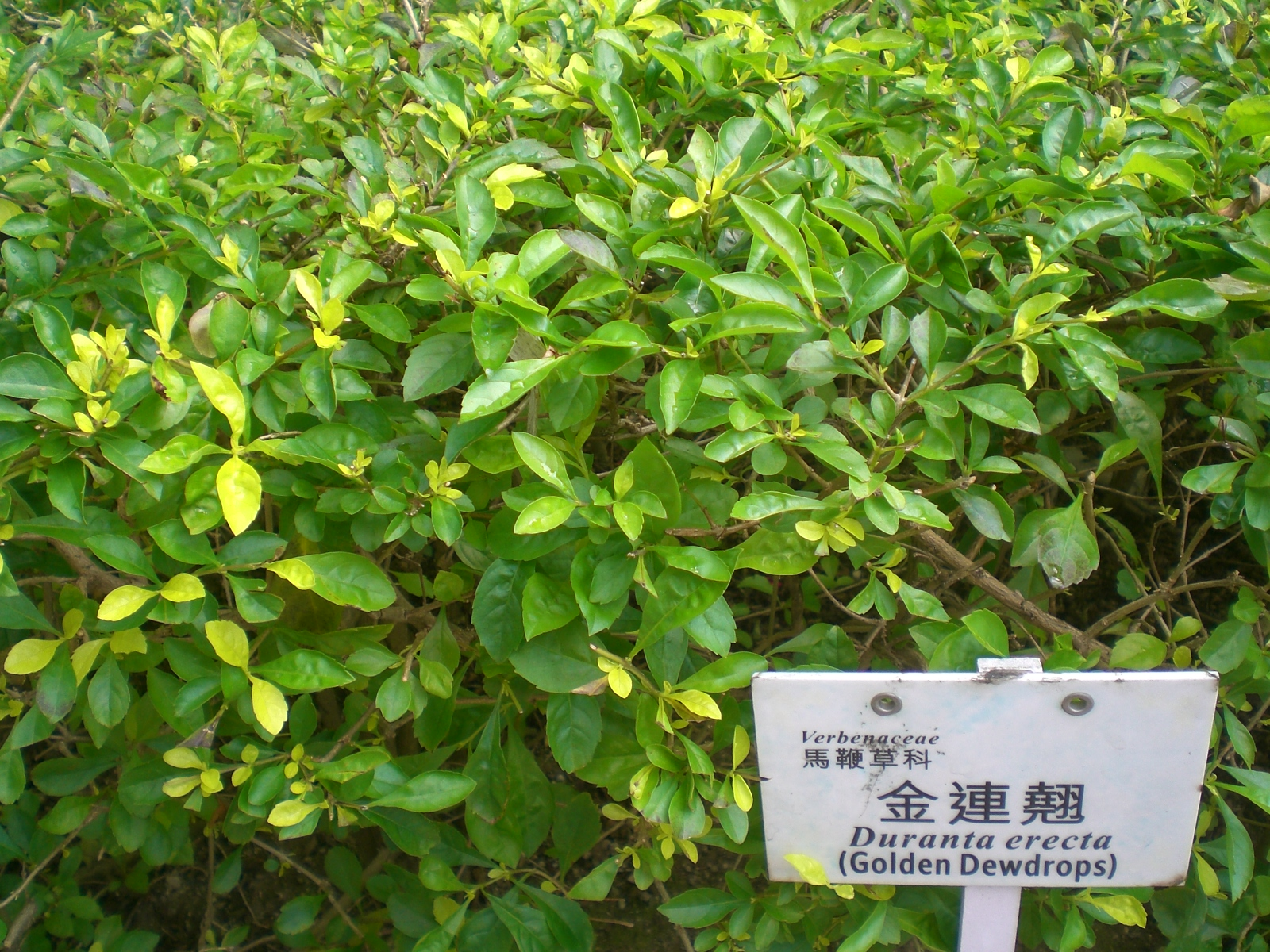
Golden Dewdrops
