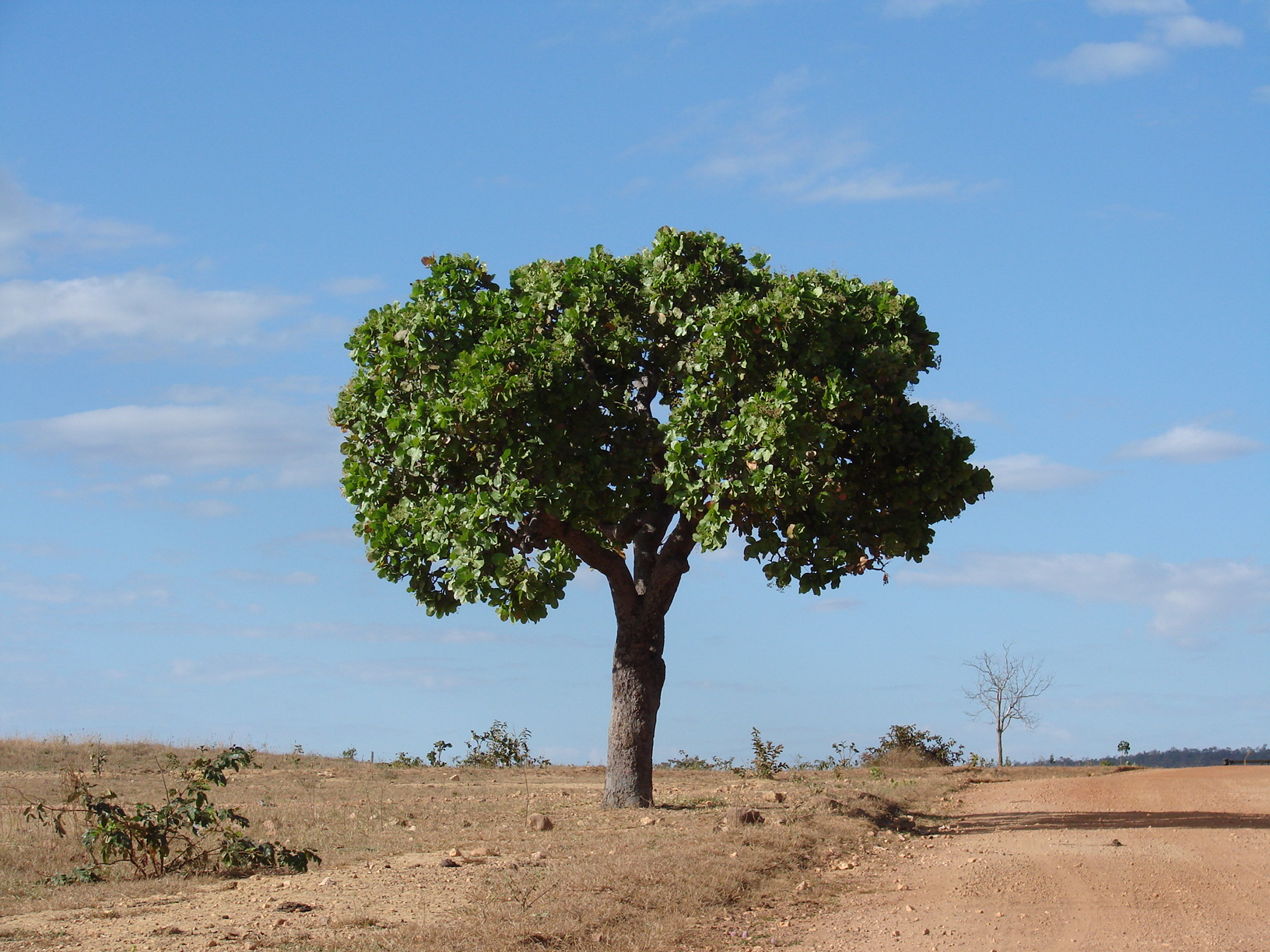
- Curatella americana in the Cerrado of Brazil.

Conservation status
- Least Concern (IUCN 3.1)

Scientific classification
- Kingdom: Plantae
- Clade: Tracheophytes
- Clade: Angiosperms
- Clade: Eudicots
- Order: Dilleniales
- Family: Dilleniaceae
- Genus: Curatella; L. 1759
- Species: C. americana

Binomial name
- Curatella americana L. 1759

Synonyms
- Curatella cambaiba A.St.-Hil. 1825; Curatella glabra Spruce ex Benth. 1861; Curatella grisebachiana Eichler 1863

= Curatella =

Genus of flowering plants

Curatella americana, commonly known as the wild cashew tree, sambaı́ba, and the sandpaper tree, is a species of tree in the family Dilleniaceae. It is the sole accepted species in genus Curatella.

== Description ==
Curatella americana is a semi-deciduous tree with a dense, rounded crown. It typically grows 6 to 10 meters (20 to 33 ft) tall. The trunk is short, thick, and usually crooked, up to 40–50 centimeters (16–20 in) in diameter.

== Range ==
Curatella americana ranges through the tropical Americas, including northern South America (Brazil, Bolivia, Peru, Colombia, Venezuela, and the Guyanas), Central America from Panama to Mexico, and the western Caribbean.

== Habitat ==
Curatella americana is generally found in savanna and dry forest habitats. In Guatemala, it is found on dry open or brushy hillsides below 1,200 meters (3,900 ft) elevation, or growing among pines.

== Human uses ==
Parts of the plant, including its edible fruits and seeds, are a local source of food, traditional medicines, and other commodities. It is generally harvested from the wild, although it is sometimes planted for its fruits and seeds. It is widely grown as an ornamental plant in Central America.
