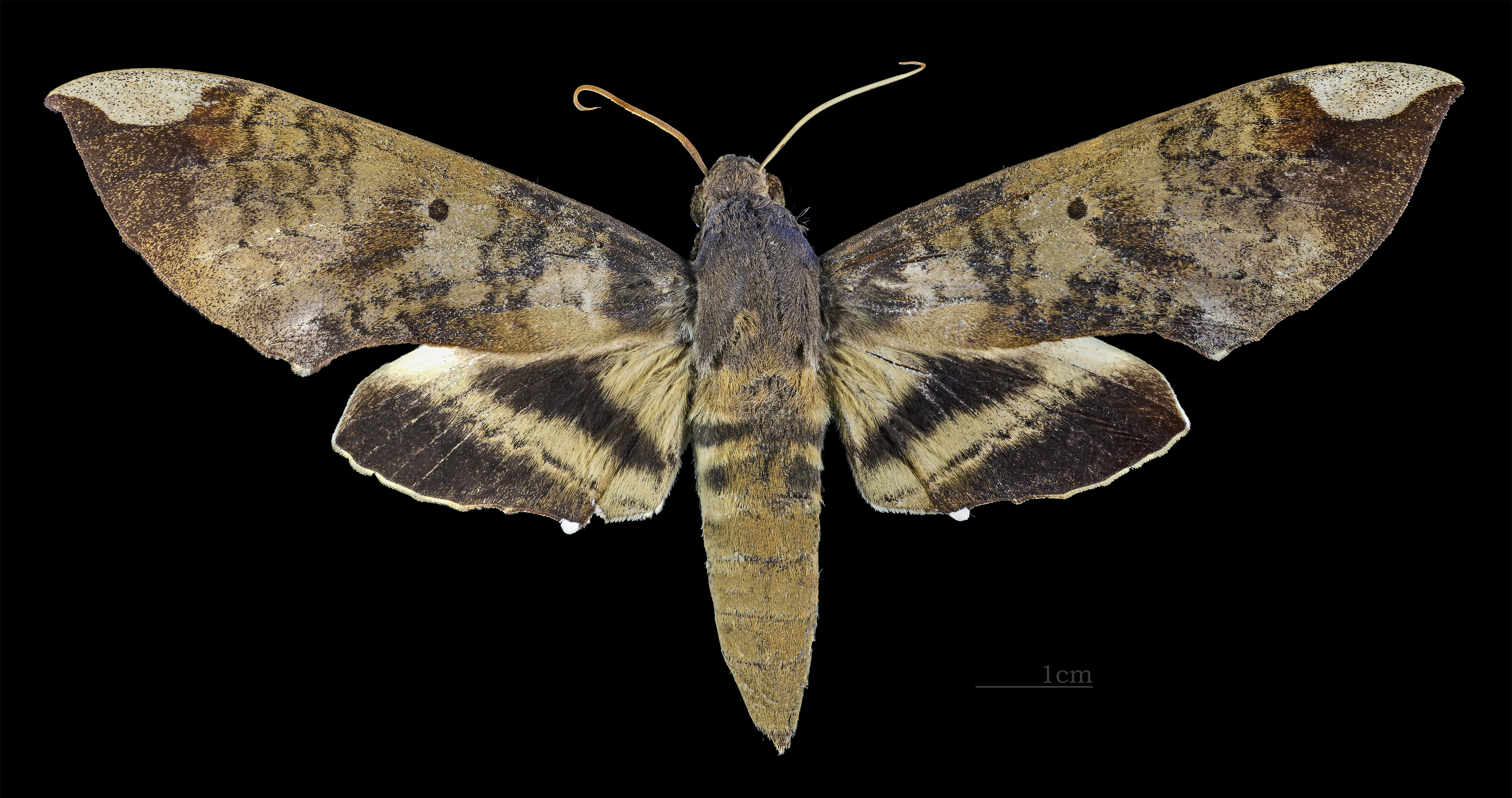
- Pachylia ficus

Scientific classification
- Domain: Eukaryota
- Kingdom: Animalia
- Phylum: Arthropoda
- Class: Insecta
- Order: Lepidoptera
- Family: Sphingidae
- Subtribe: Dilophonotina
- Genus: Pachylia; Walker, 1856

Synonyms
- Pachylia H. Lucas, 1857

= Pachylia =

Genus of moths

Pachylia is a genus of moths in the family Sphingidae. The genus was erected by Francis Walker in 1856.

== Species ==
- Pachylia darceta H. Druce, 1881
- Pachylia ficus (Linnaeus, 1758)
- Pachylia syces (Hübner, 1819)
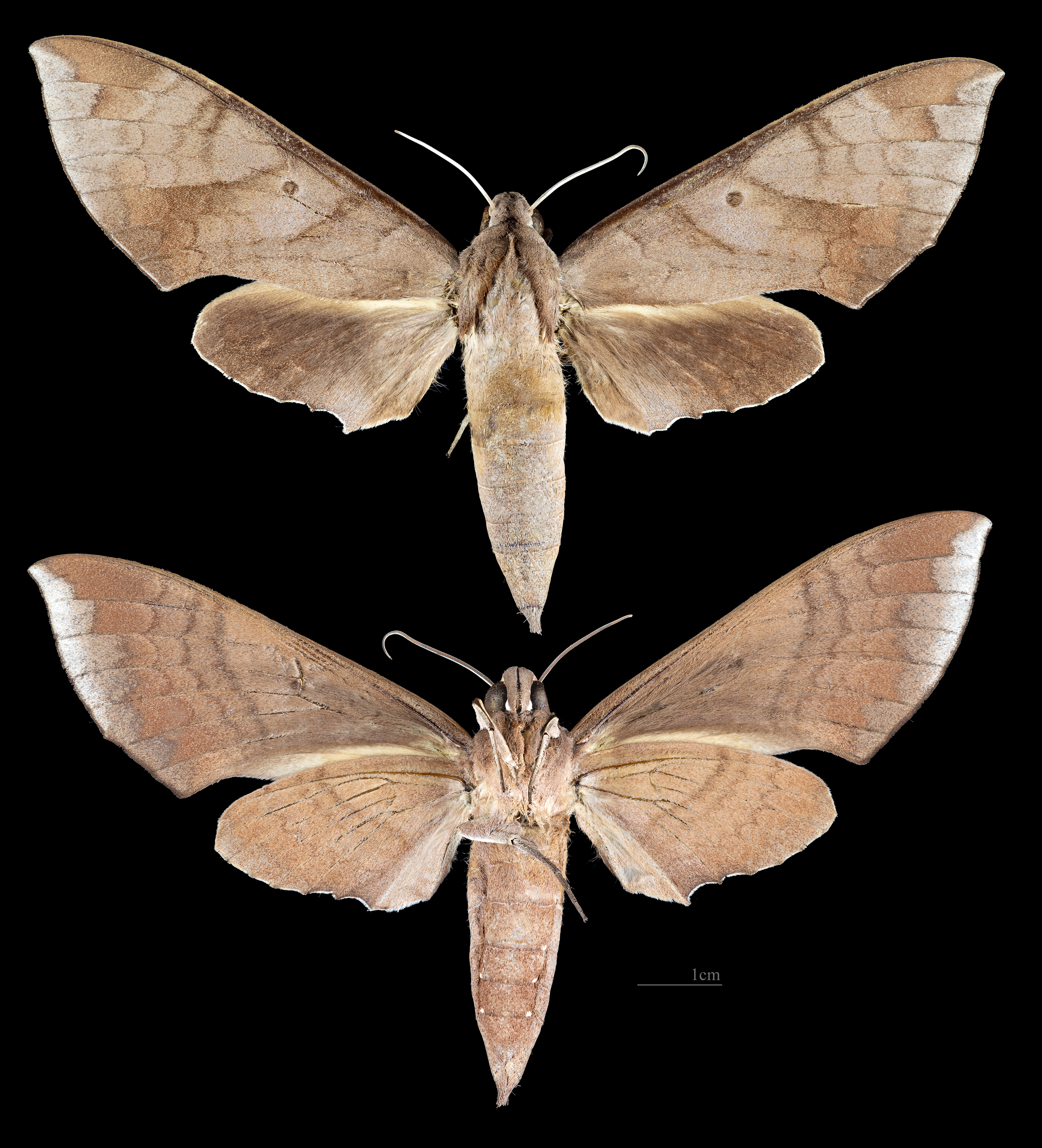
Pachylia darceta

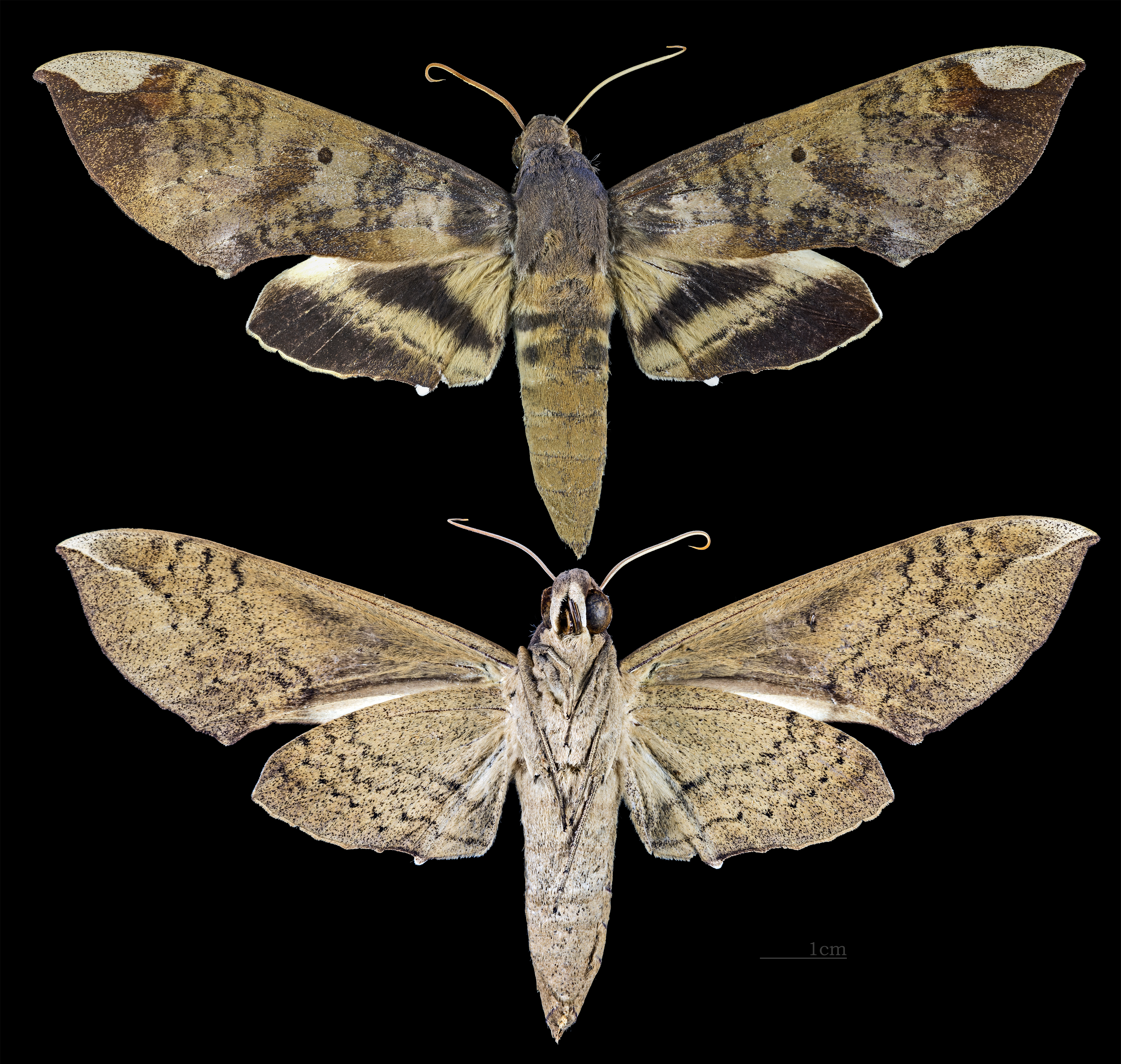
Pachylia ficus

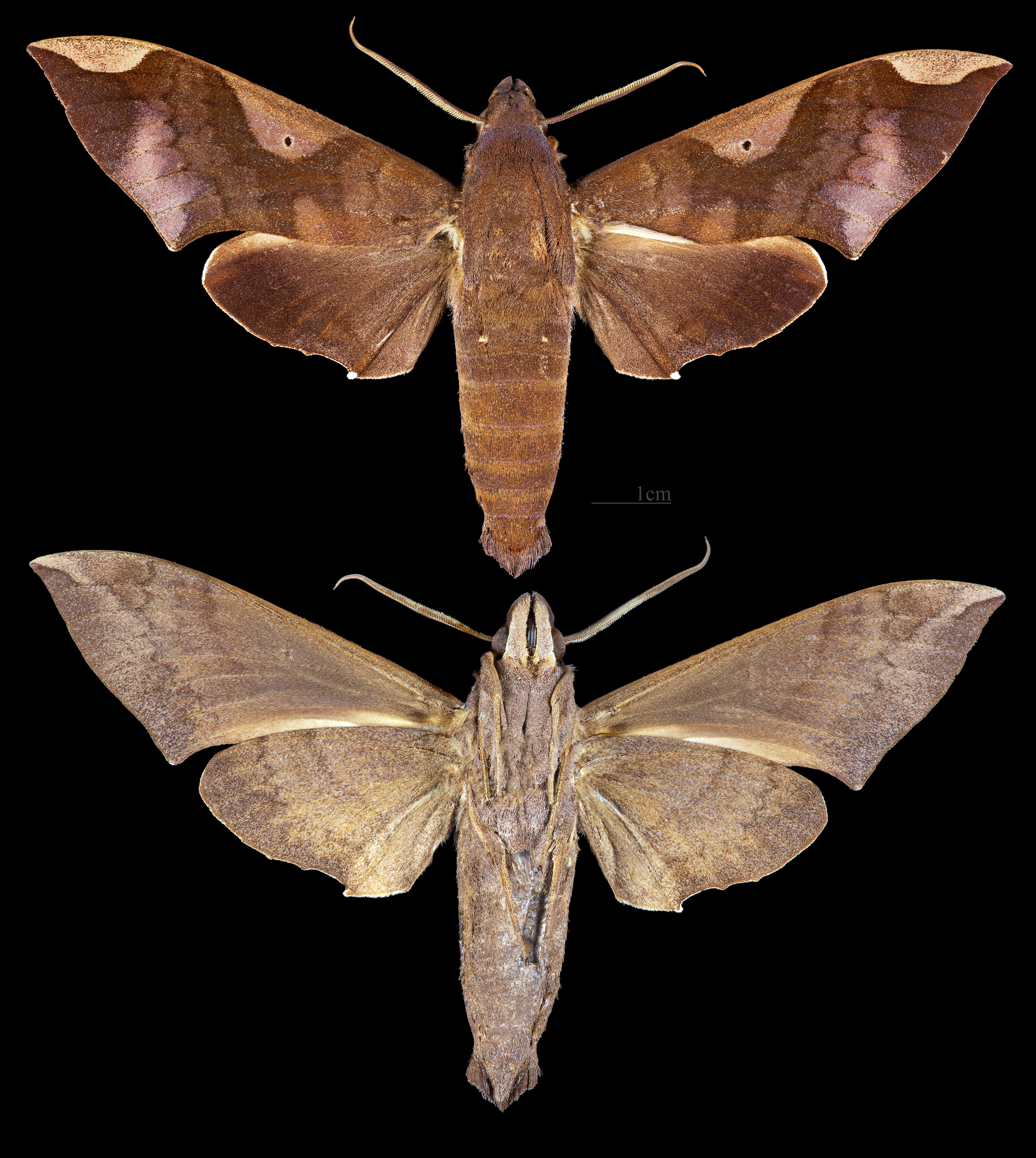
Pachylia syces
