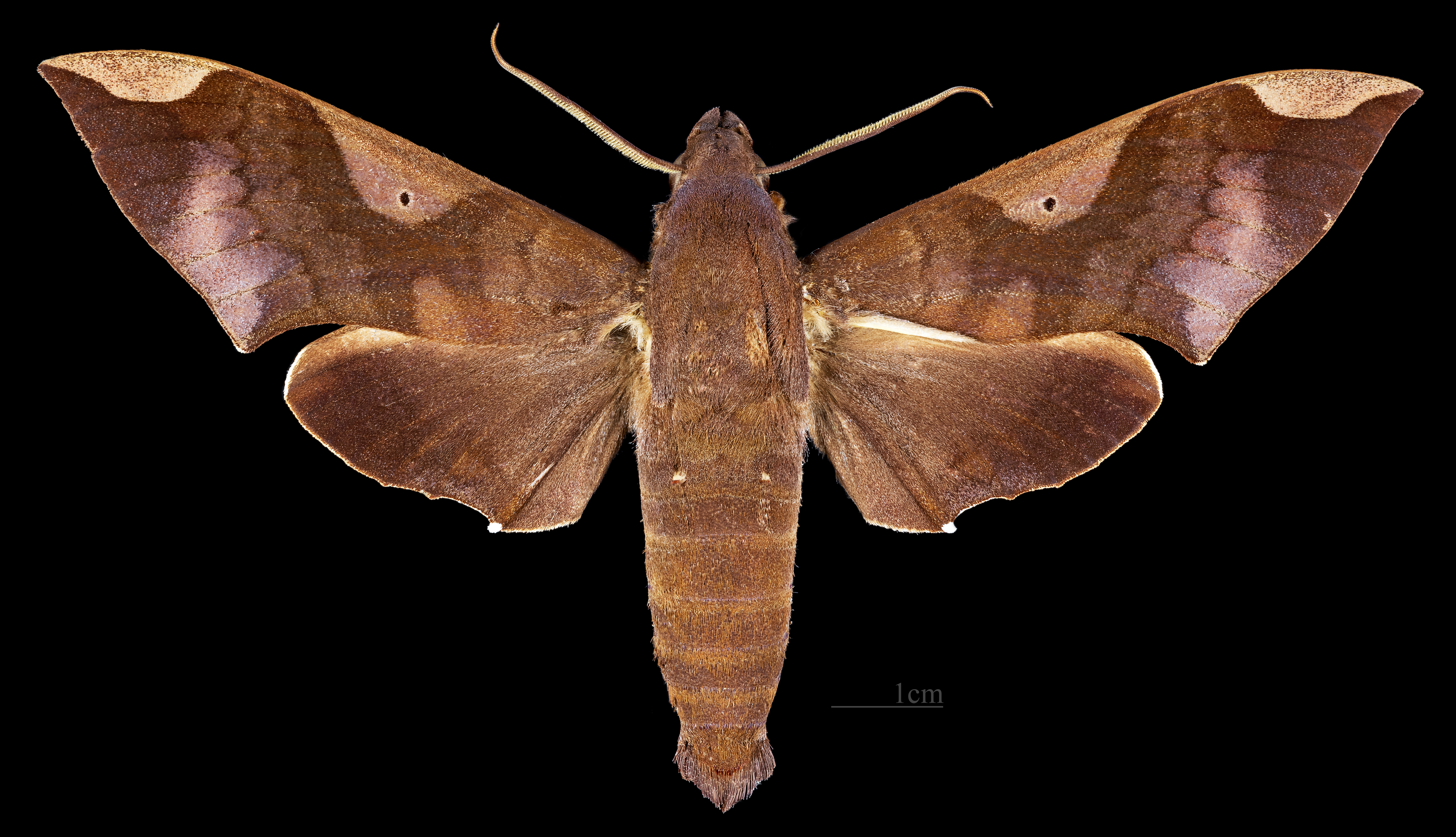
- Pachylia syces ♂
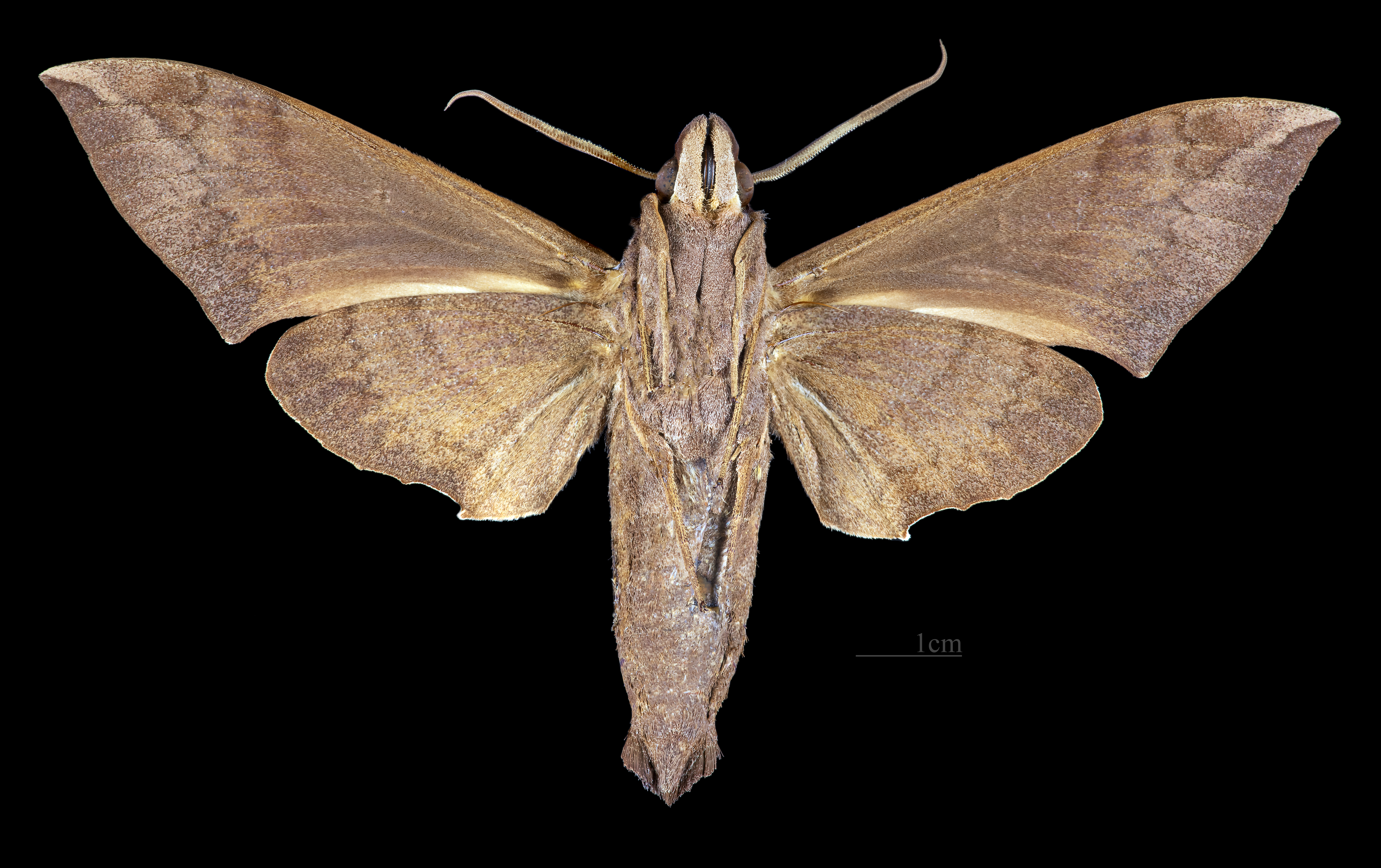
- Pachylia syces ♂ △

Scientific classification
- Kingdom: Animalia
- Phylum: Arthropoda
- Class: Insecta
- Order: Lepidoptera
- Family: Sphingidae
- Genus: Pachylia
- Species: P. syces

Binomial name
- Pachylia syces (Hubner, 1819)

Synonyms
- Enyo syces Hübner, 1819; Pachylia inornata Clemens, 1859; Pachylia syces cubensis Closs, 1911; Pachylia syces septentrionalis Gehlen, 1944

= Pachylia syces =

Species of moth

Pachylia syces is a moth of the family Sphingidae.

== Distribution ==
It is found from Mexico through Belize and Honduras to Brazil, Bolivia and Argentina. It is also found on Jamaica.

== Subspecies ==
- Pachylia syces syces (Mexico through Belize and Honduras to Brazil, Bolivia, Paraguay and Argentina)
- Pachylia syces insularis Rothschild & Jordan, 1903 (Jamaica)

== Description ==
There is a pale median band on the forewing upperside which is separated into two patches. Occasionally the patches are connected into a continuous transverse band, but if so, the band so formed is strongly constricted. The hindwing upperside is almost unicolorous, darkened distally, without distinct bands and with a conspicuous white tip.

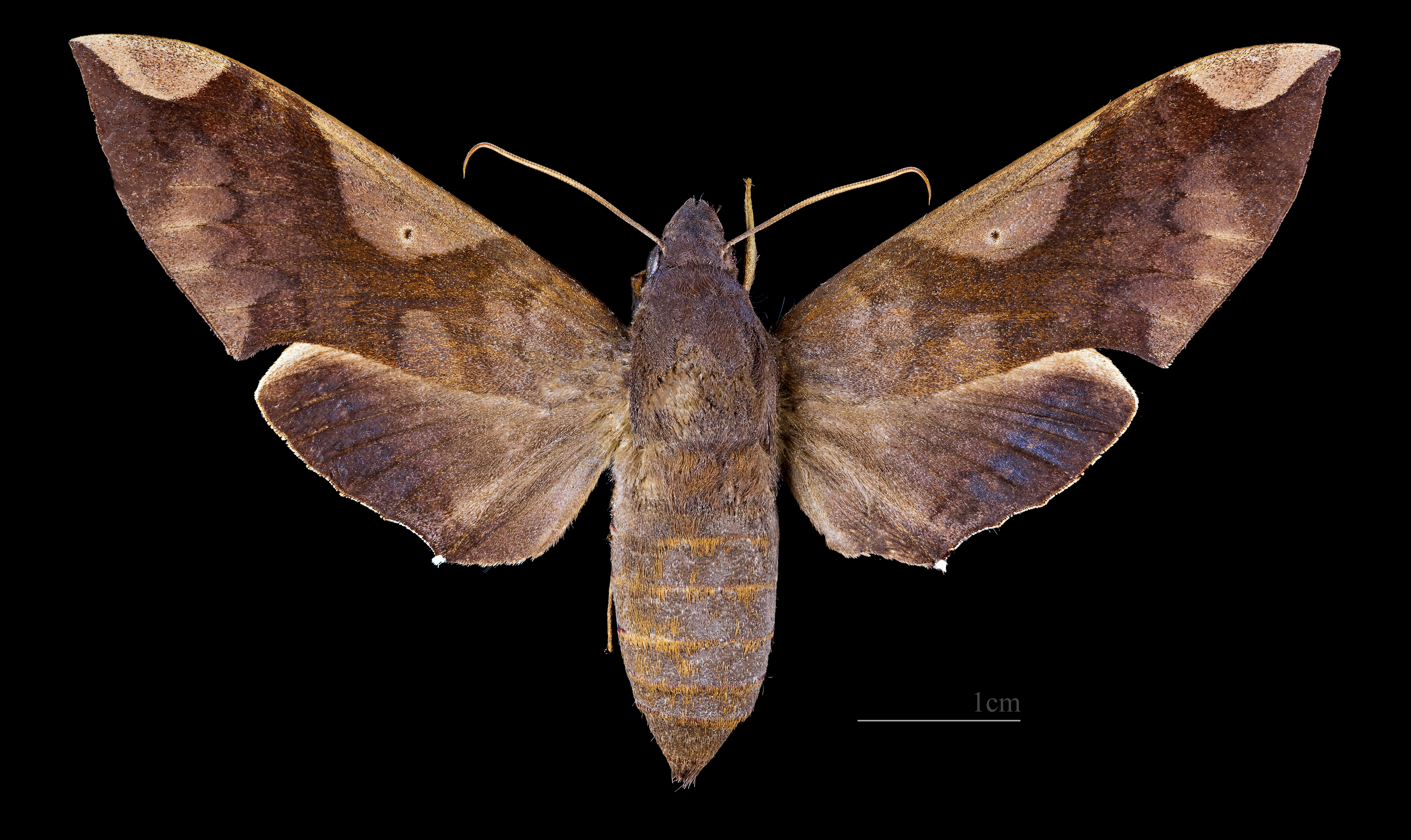
Pachylia syces ♀

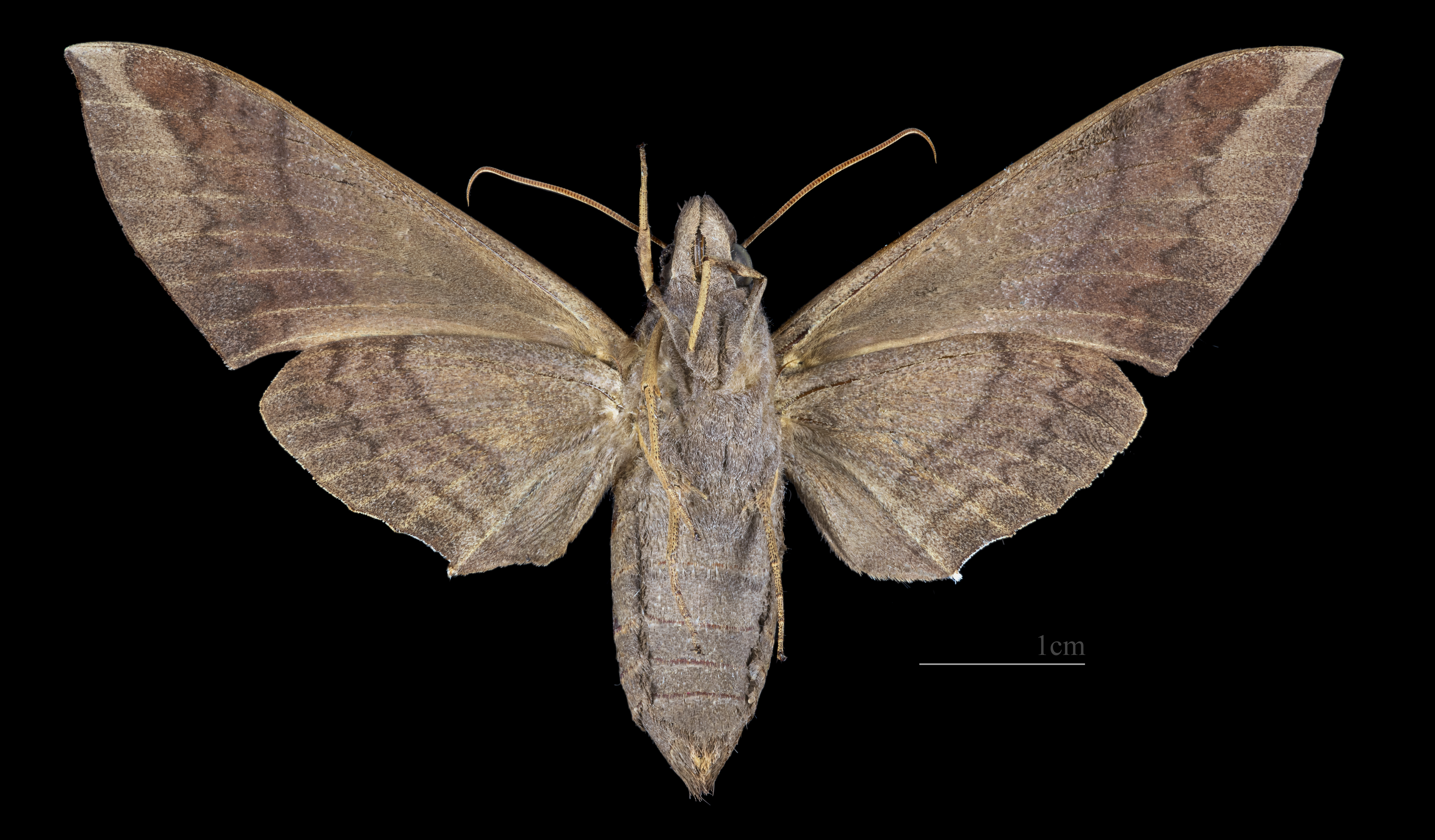
Pachylia syces ♀ △

== Biology ==
There are probably multiple generations per year.

The larvae have been recorded feeding on Ficus microcarpa, Ficus prinoides, Ficus ovalis and Artocarpus integrifolius.

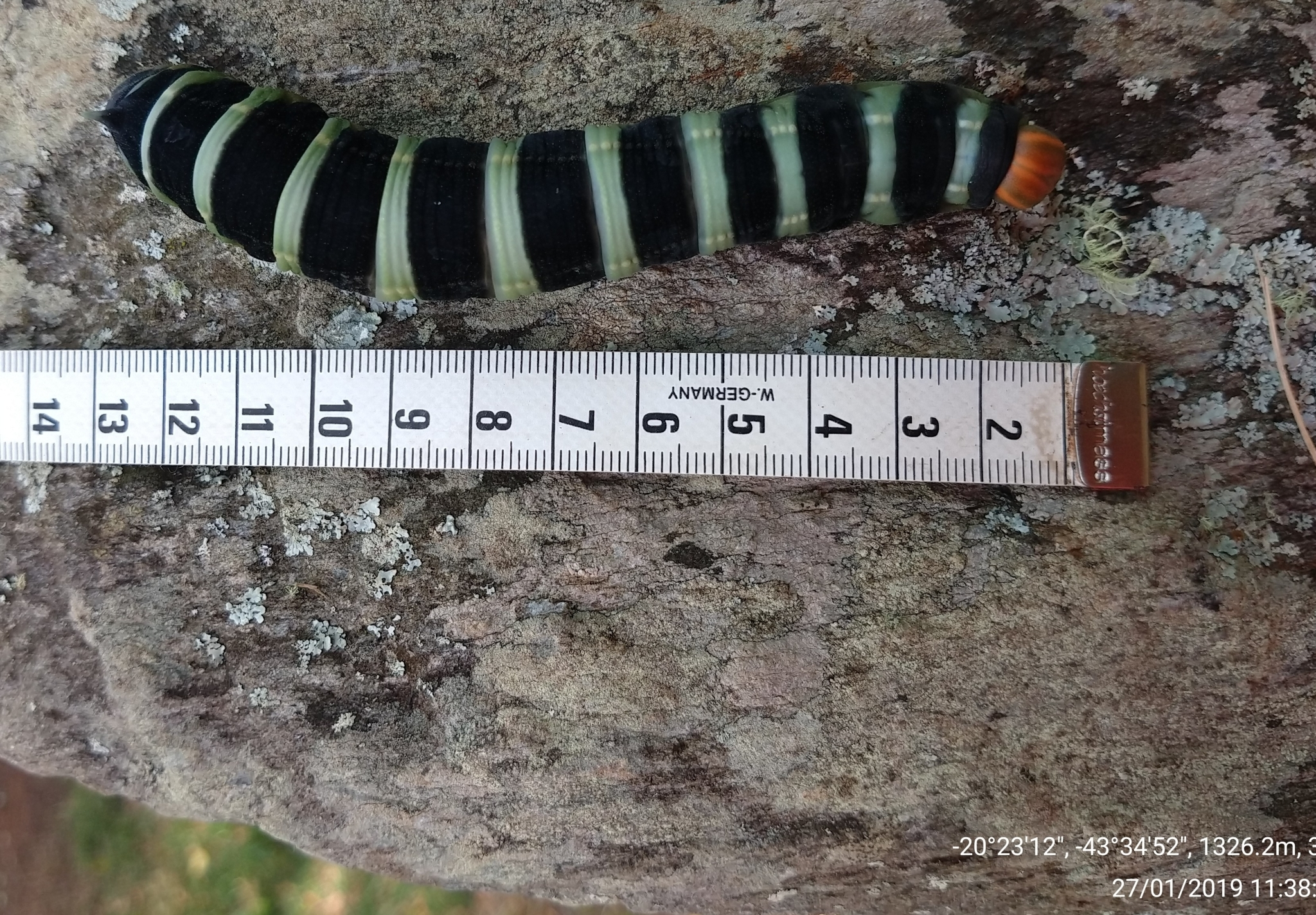
Larva measurement

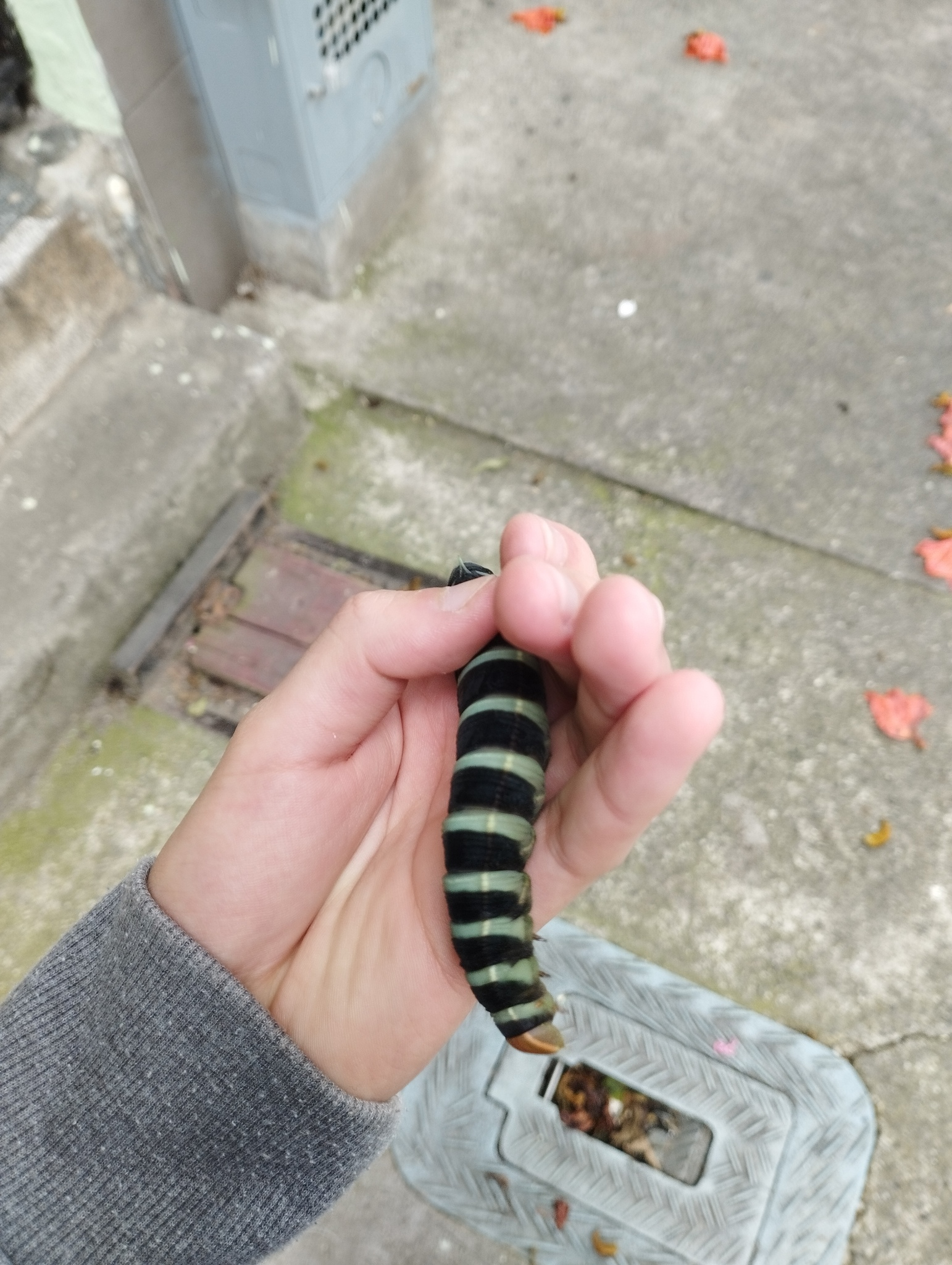
Larva size comparison

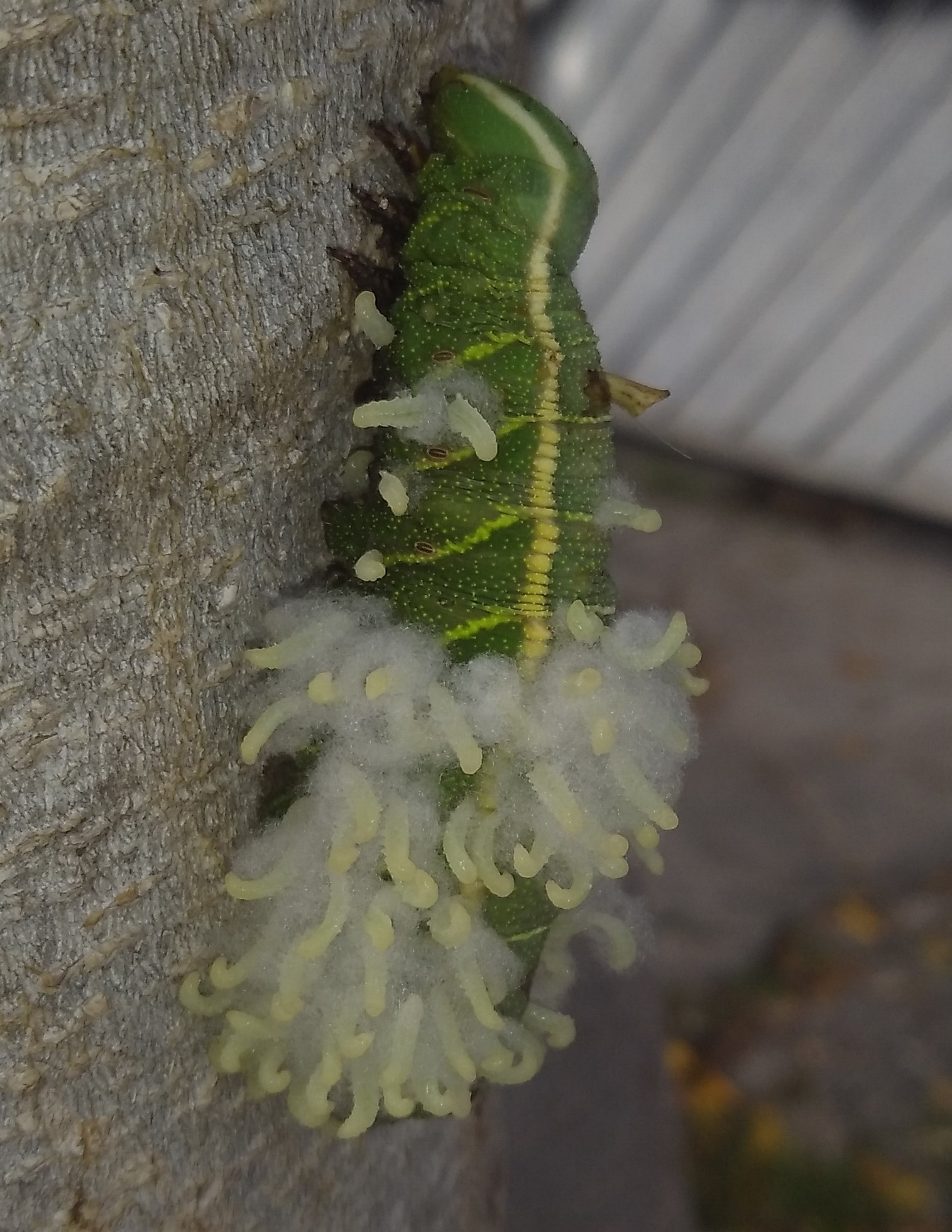
With parasitic wasp larvae

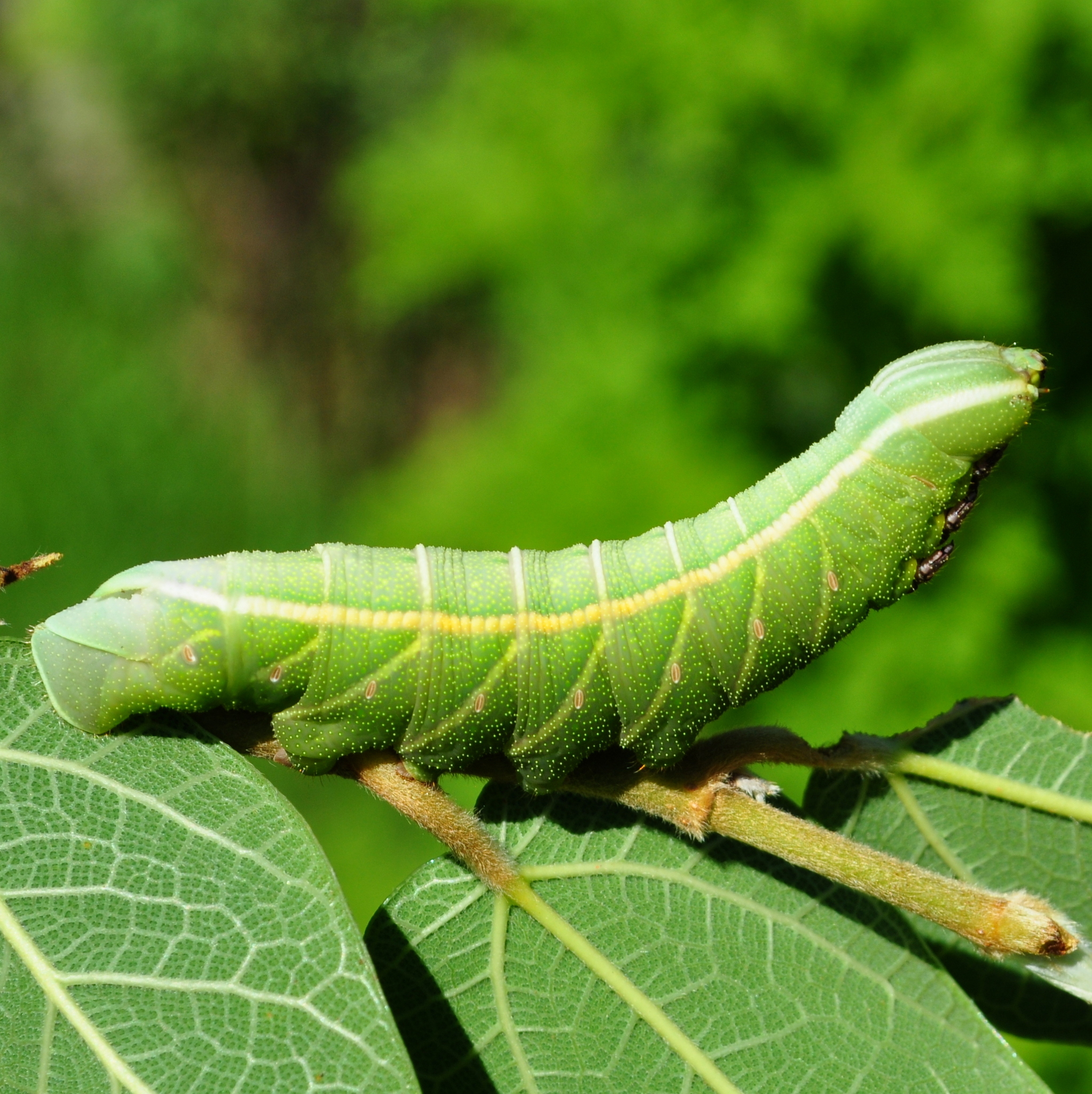
Green colour phase

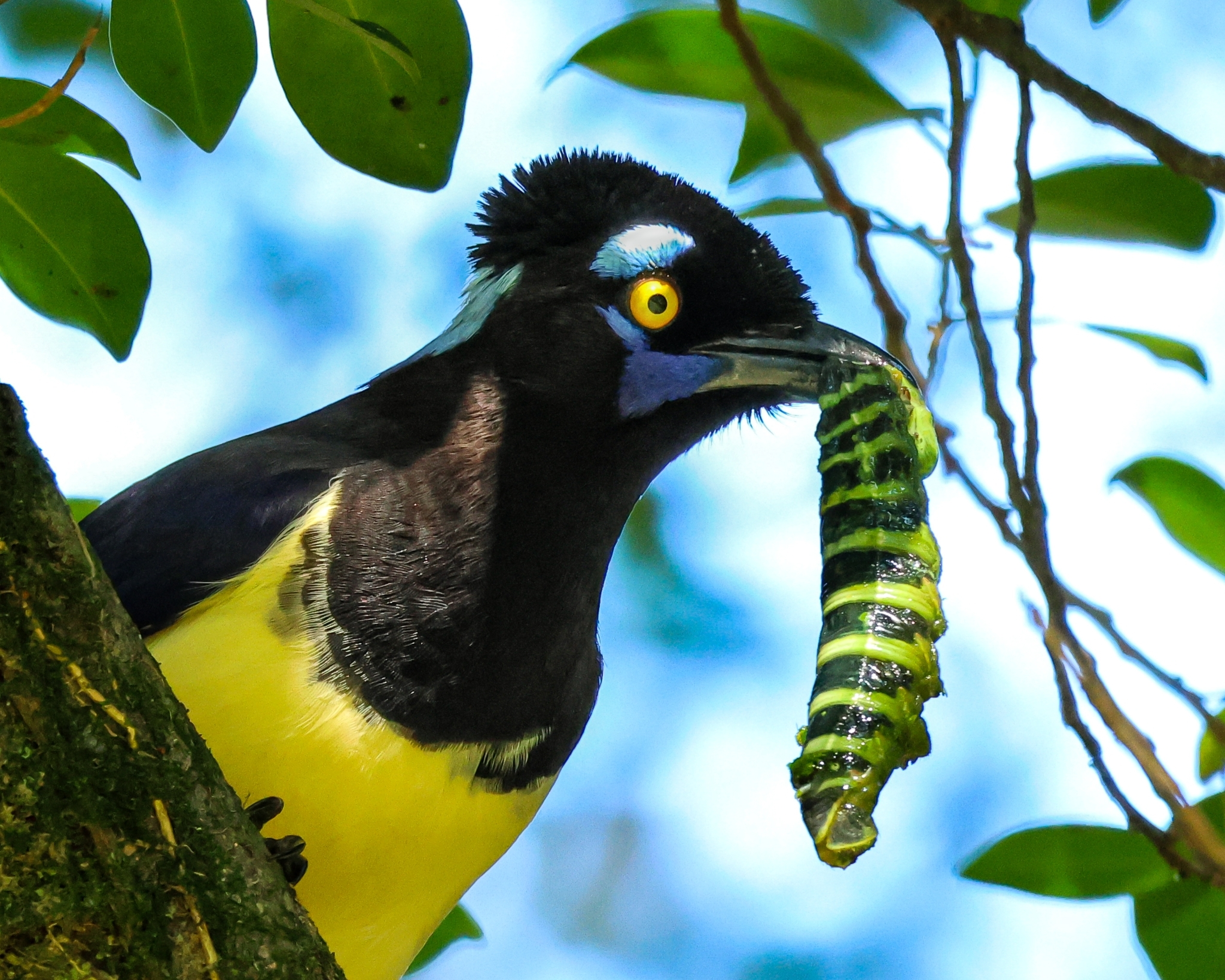
Preyed on by a plush-crested jay
