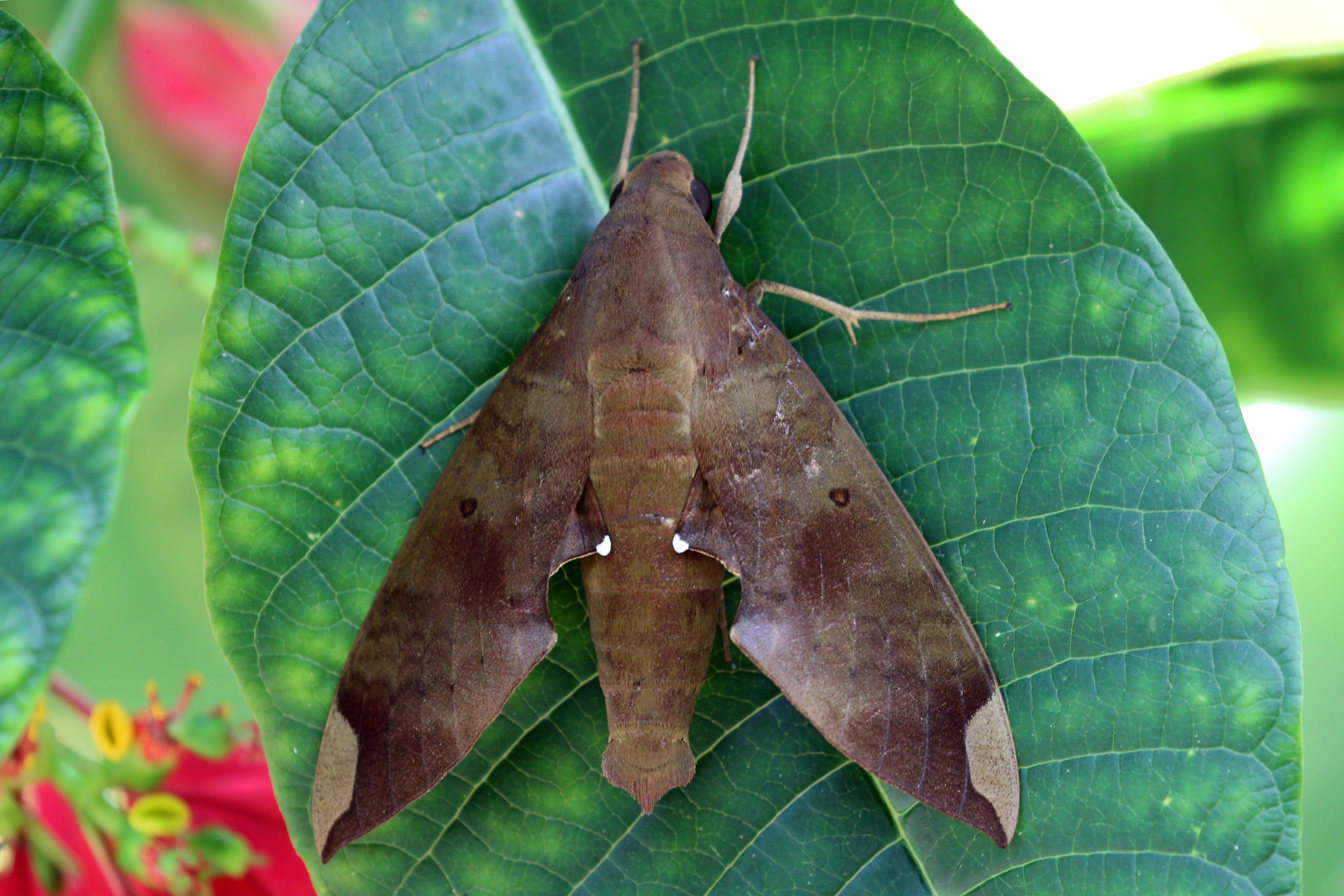
- Queen Elizabeth II Botanic Park, Grand Cayman

Conservation status
- Secure (NatureServe)

Scientific classification
- Kingdom: Animalia
- Phylum: Arthropoda
- Clade: Pancrustacea
- Class: Insecta
- Order: Lepidoptera
- Family: Sphingidae
- Genus: Pachylia
- Species: P. ficus

Binomial name
- Pachylia ficus (Linnaeus, 1758)

Synonyms
- Sphinx ficus Linnaeus, 1758; Pachylia undatifascia Butler, 1876; Pachylia lyncea Clemens, 1859; Chaerocampa crameri Ménétriés, 1857; Pachylia ficus venezuelensis Schaufuss, 1870; Pachylia ficus aterrima (Bönninghausen, 1899)

= Pachylia ficus =

Fig sphinx

Species of moth

Pachylia ficus, known as the fig sphinx, is a moth of the family Sphingidae. It lives across South America from Uruguay through to Central America, and to the southern tip of the United States, straying into Arizona and Texas.

== Description ==
It has a wingspan of 4 3/8–5 1/2 inches (110–140 mm), with orange-brown wings.

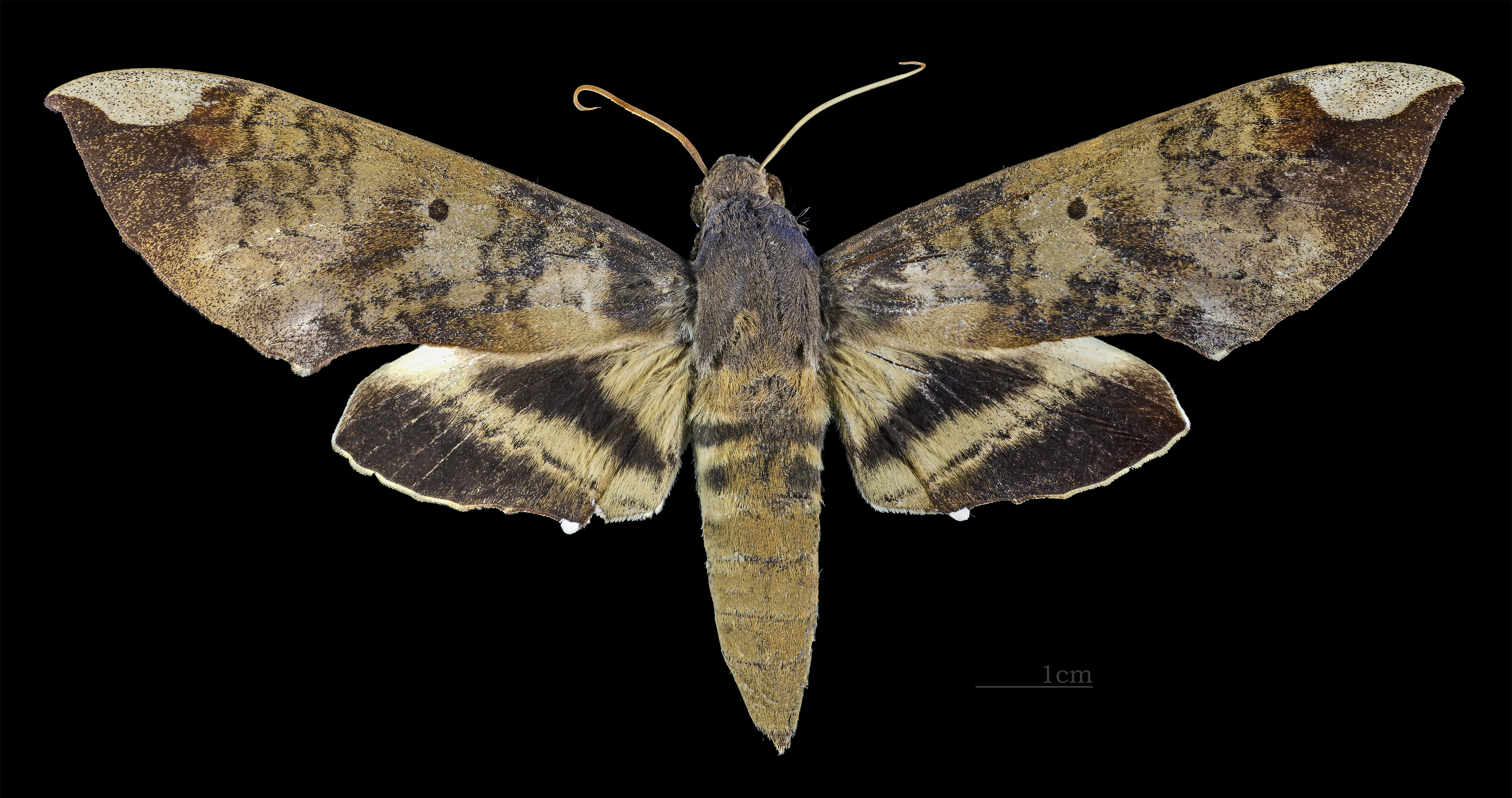
Pachylia ficus male
Dorsal side MHNT

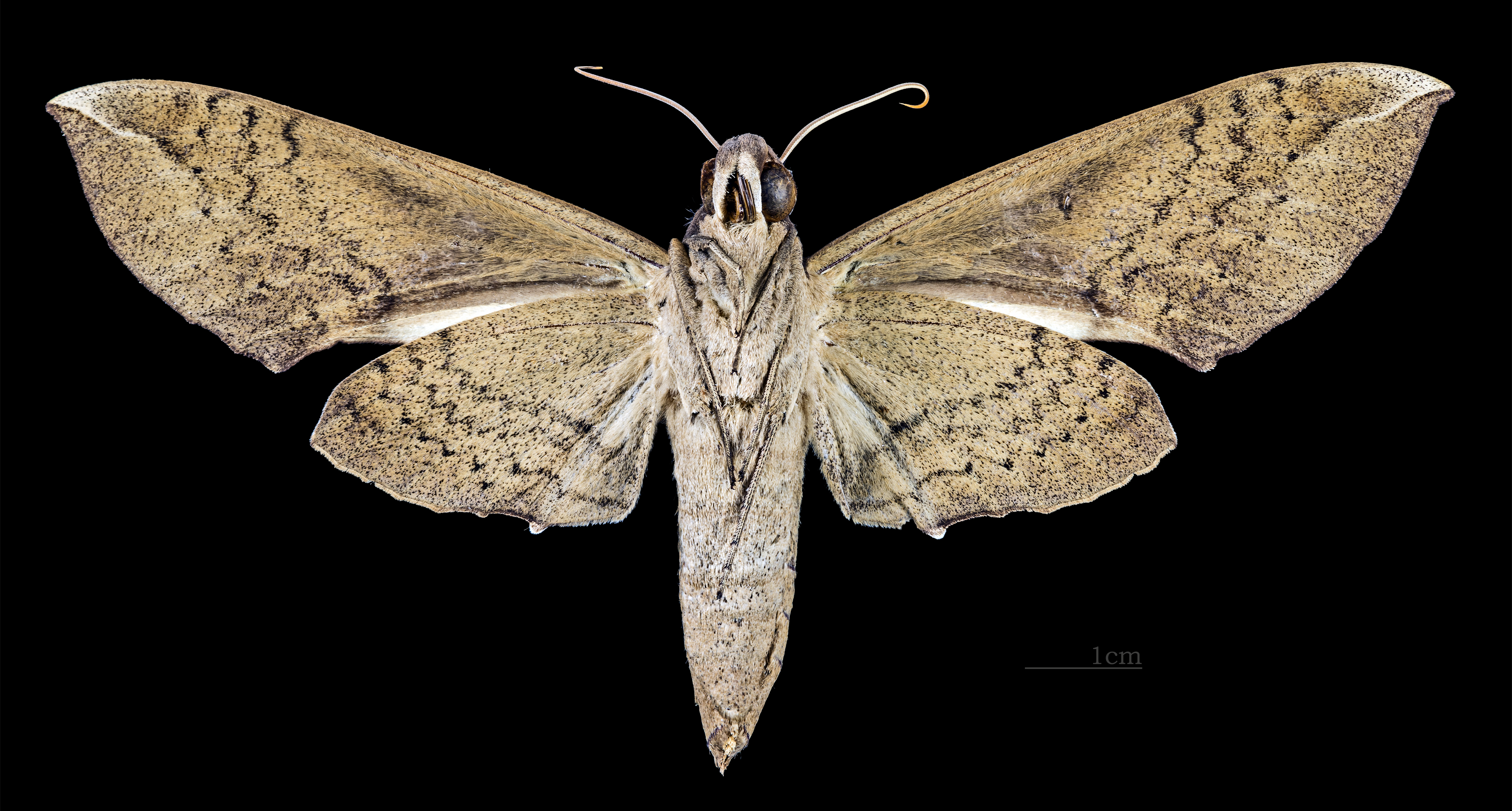
Pachylia ficus male
△ Ventral side MHNT

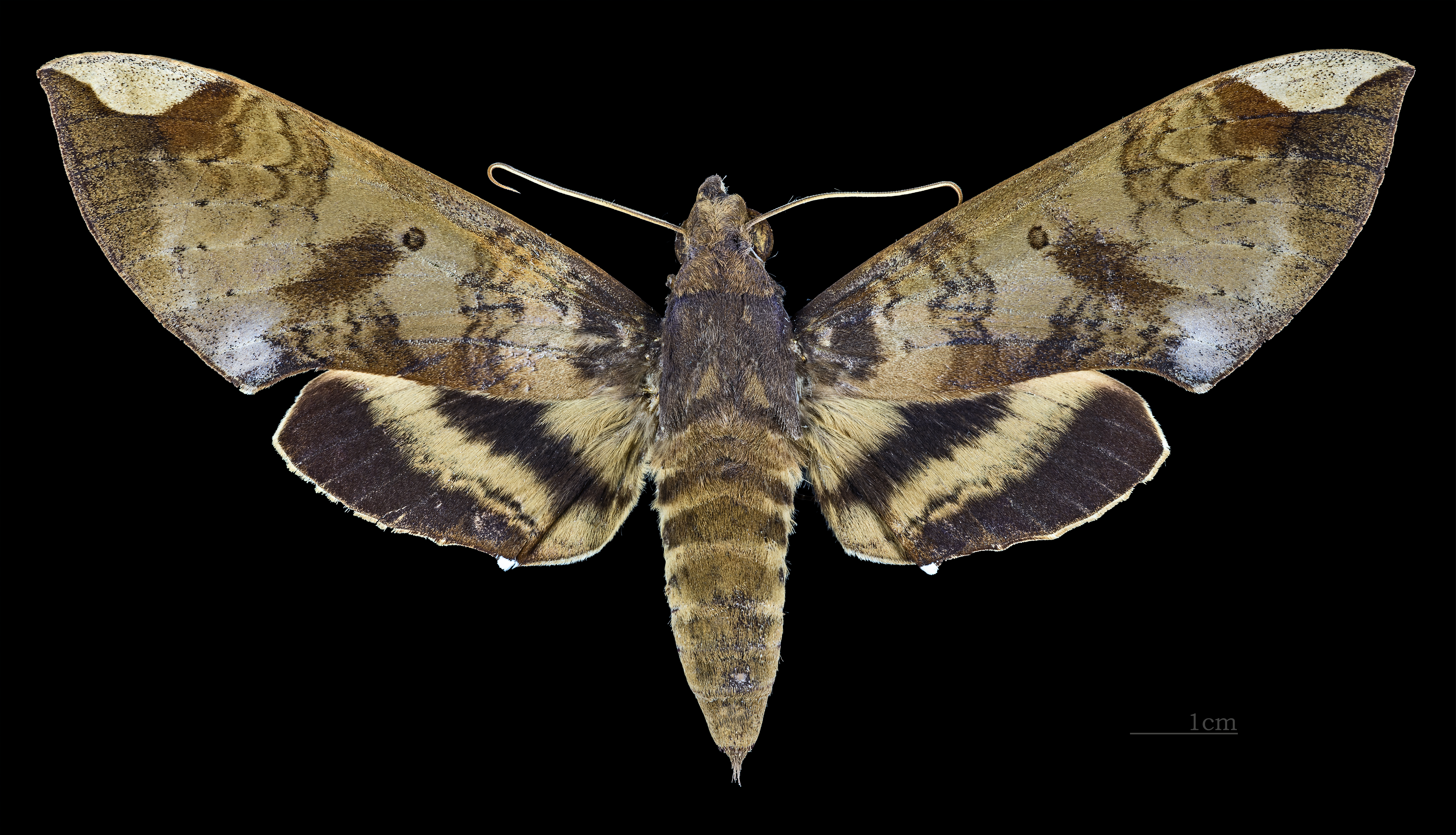
Pachylia ficus female
Dorsal side MHNT

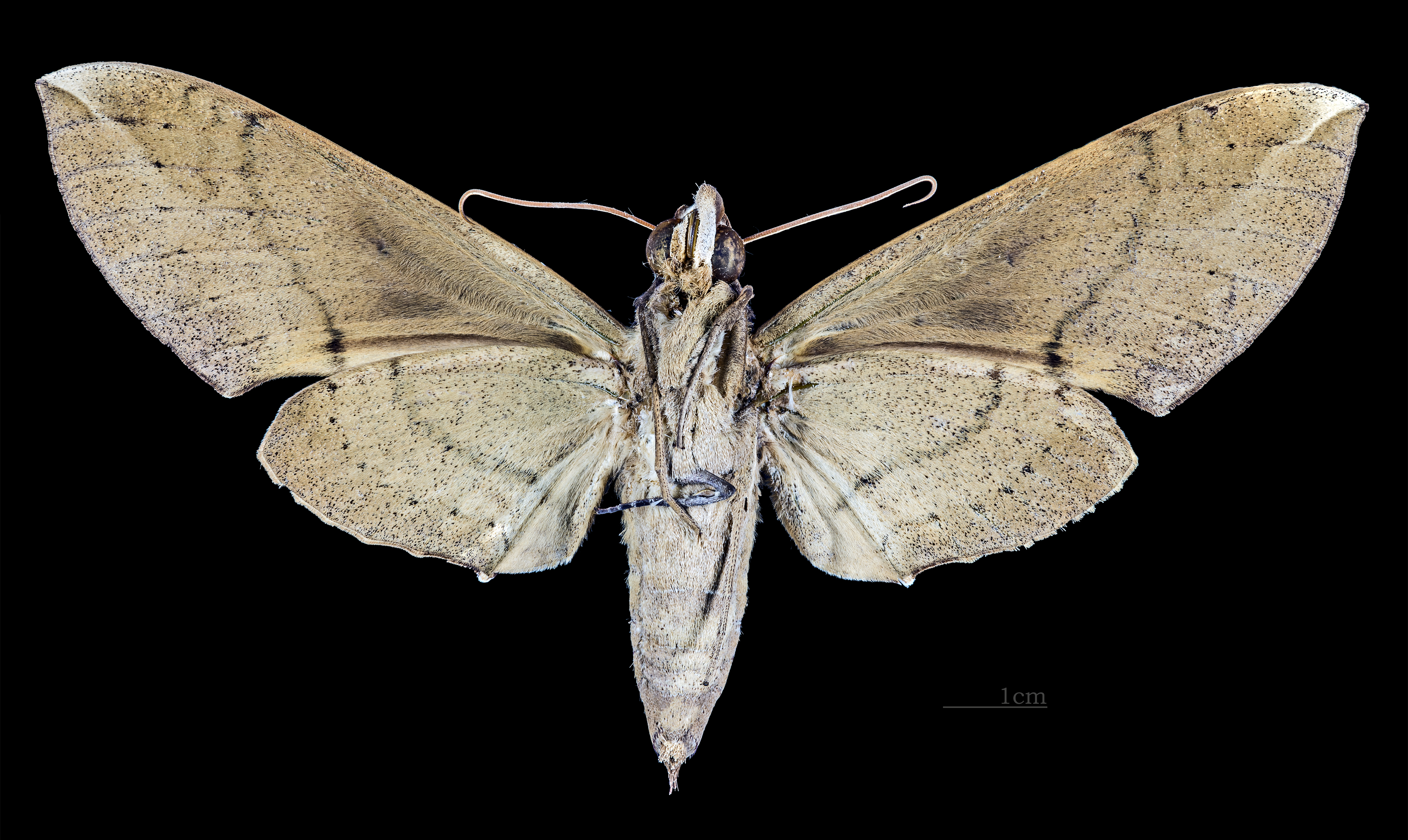
Pachylia ficus female
△ Ventral side MHNT

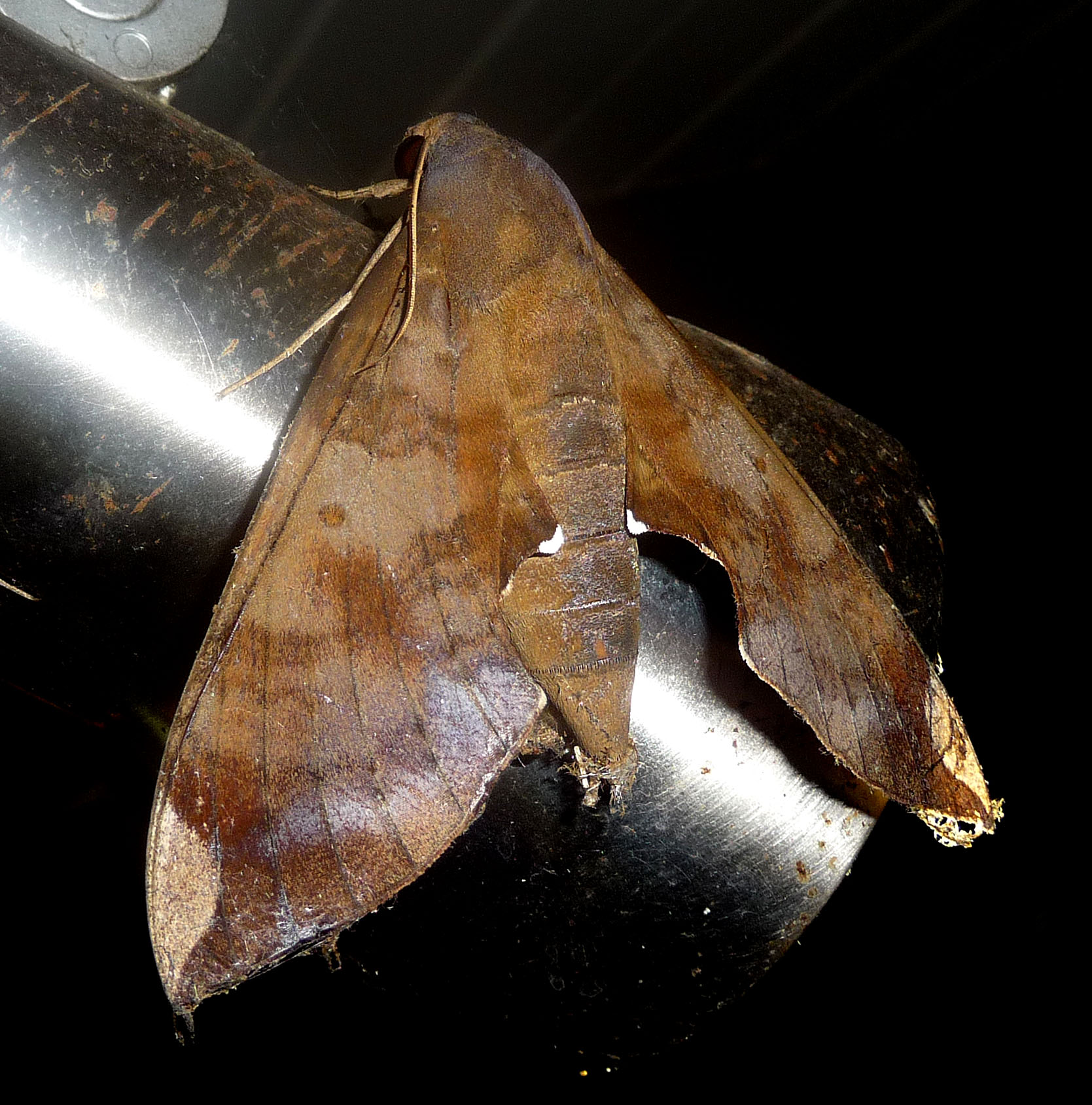

== Biology ==
There are several generations per year in the tropics, peninsular Florida and southern Texas. Adults have been recorded in February, September and November in Brazil and in June in Panama. The adults feed on the nectar of various flowers, including Asystasia gangetica and the endangered ghost orchid (Dendrophylax lindenii). They also pollinate the ghost orchid.

The larvae have been recorded feeding on Ficus aurea, Ficus carica, Ficus microcarpa, Ficus religiosa, Ficus pumila, Ficus gamelleira, Ficus prinoides, Ficus pumila and Artocarpus integrifolius. There are several colour morphs. Pupation takes place in a cocoon spun amongst leaf litter.
