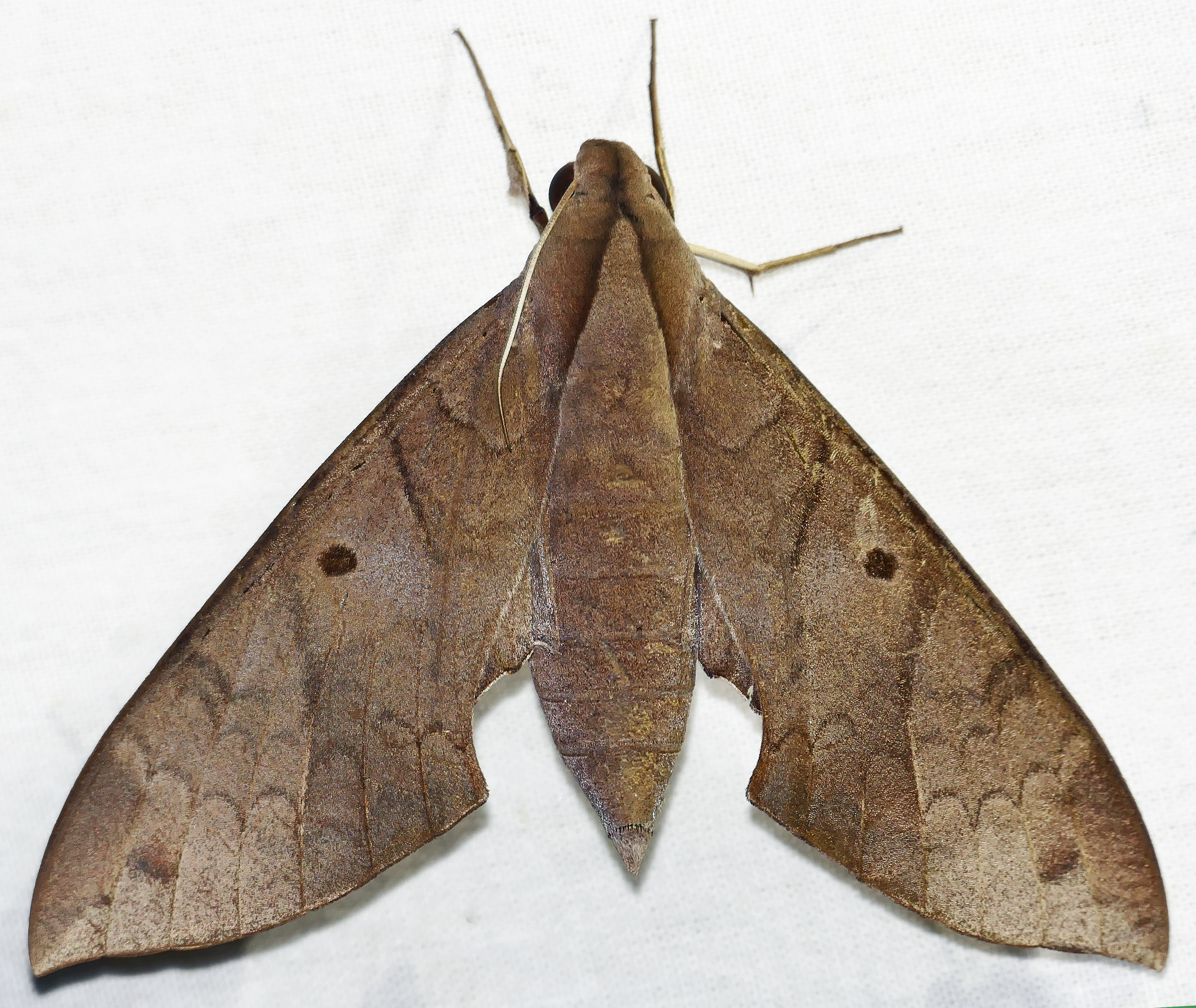

Scientific classification
- Domain: Eukaryota
- Kingdom: Animalia
- Phylum: Arthropoda
- Class: Insecta
- Order: Lepidoptera
- Family: Sphingidae
- Genus: Pachylia
- Species: P. darceta

Binomial name
- Pachylia darceta H. Druce, 1881

= Pachylia darceta =

Species of moth

Pachylia darceta is a moth of the family Sphingidae first described by Herbert Druce in 1881.

== Distribution ==
It is known from Panama, Costa Rica, Venezuela, Brazil and Bolivia.

== Description ==
There are three oblique black lines on the forewing upperside and two in the basal half of the wing. The hindwing upperside is uniform brown without markings.

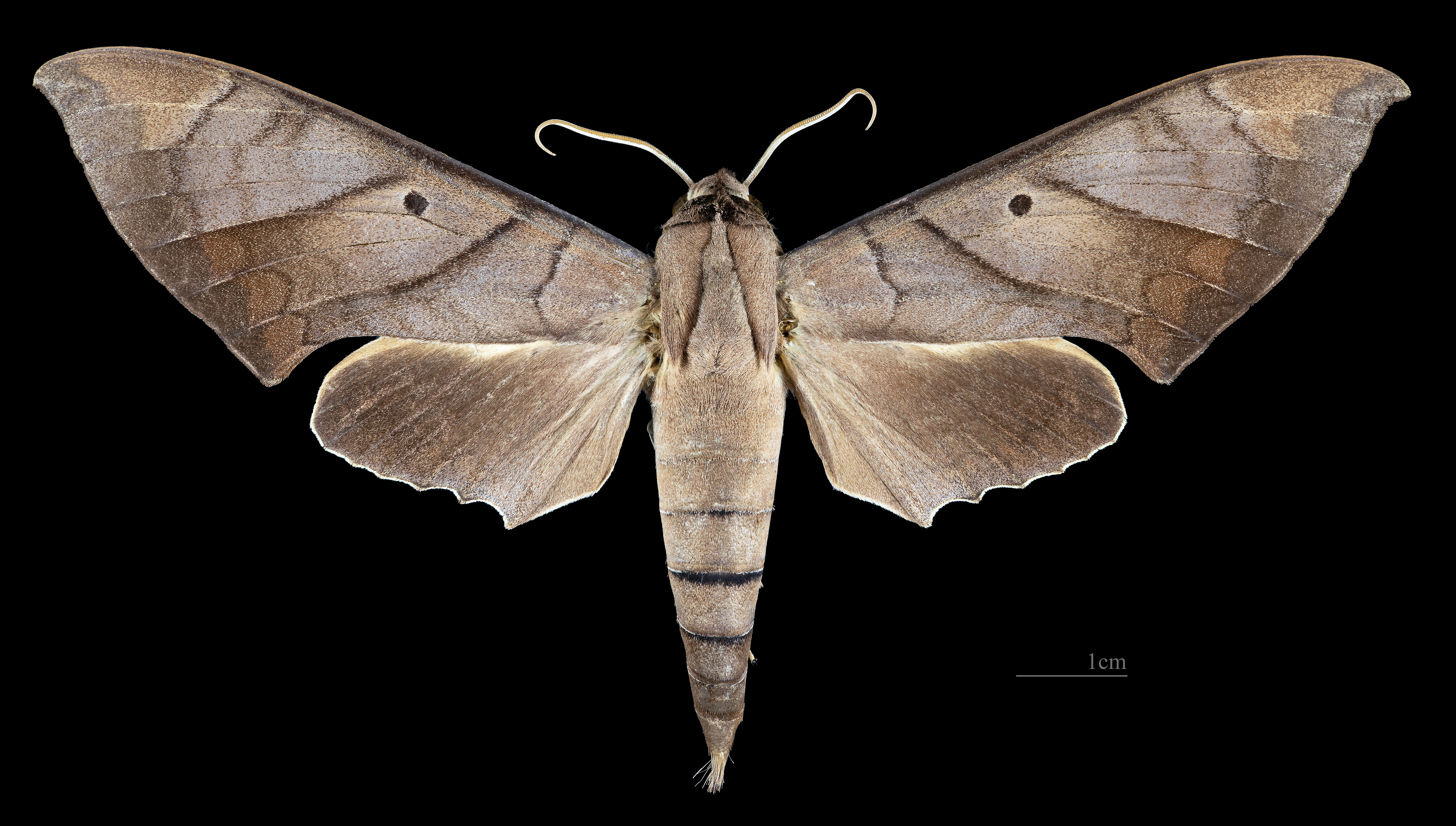
Male dorsal view

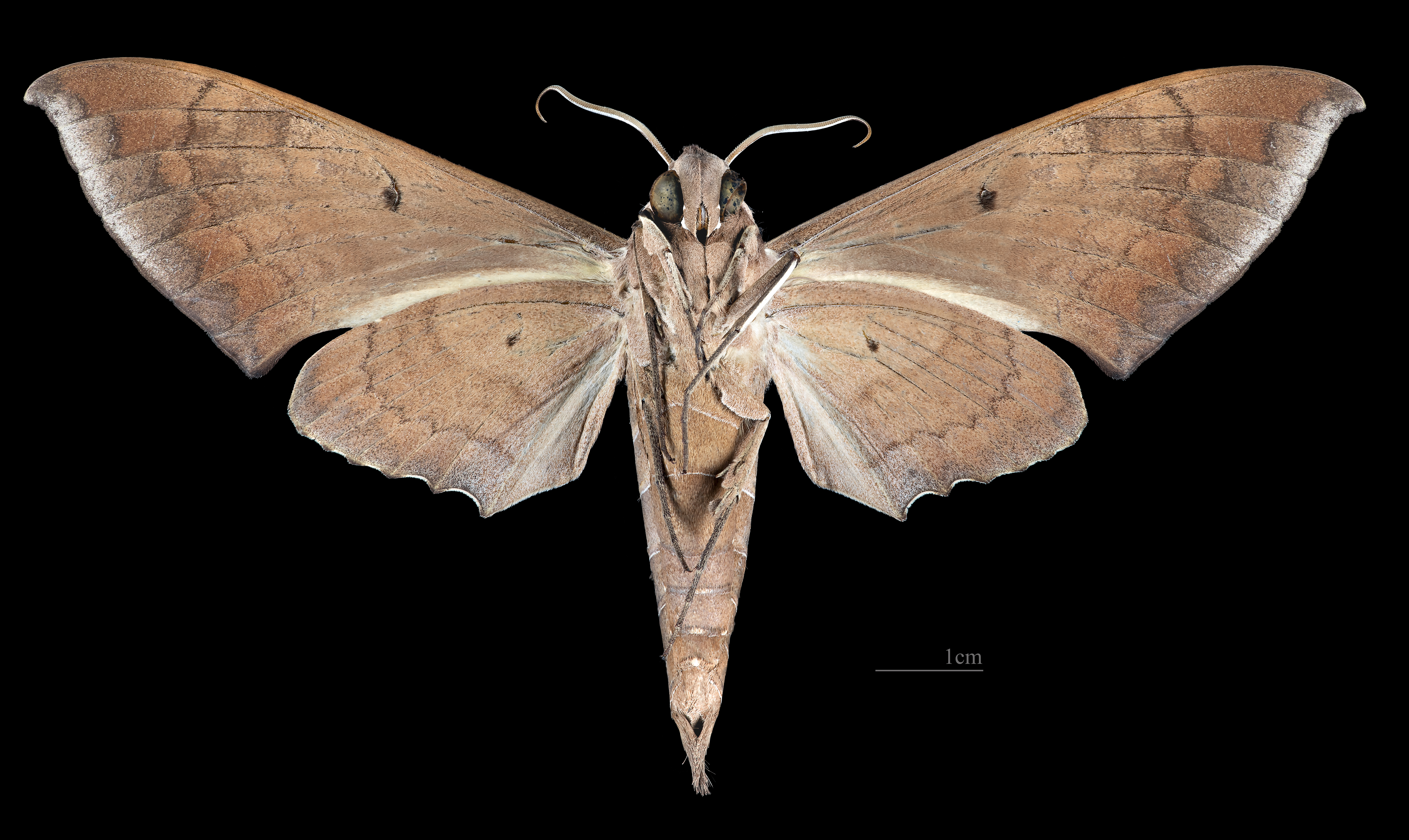
Male ventral view

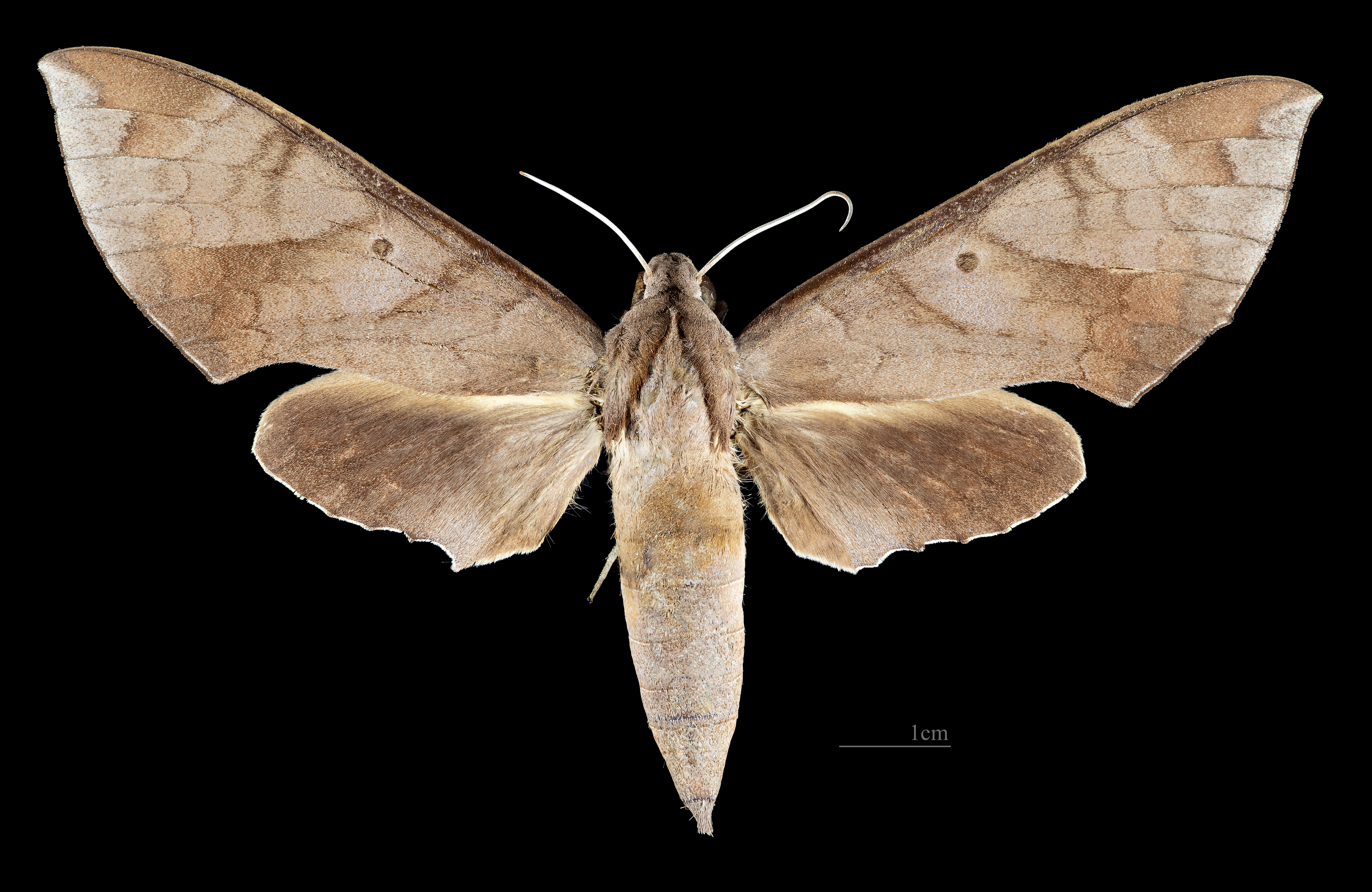
Female dorsal view

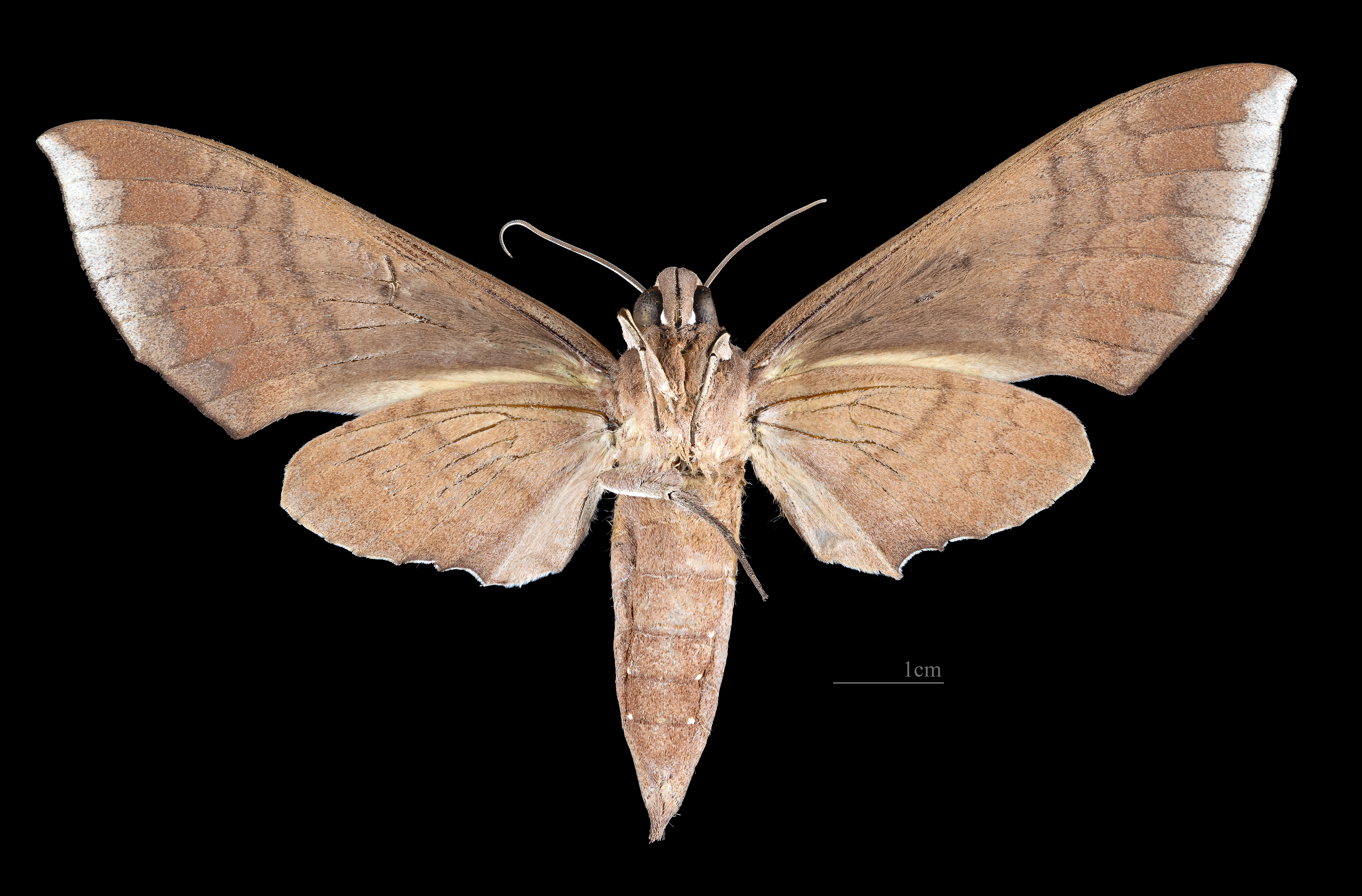
Female ventral view

== Biology ==
There are probably multiple generations per year. Adults have been recorded from early August to September in Brazil.
