= Eois stellataria =

Scientific classification
- Kingdom: Animalia
- Phylum: Arthropoda
- Clade: Pancrustacea
- Class: Insecta
- Order: Lepidoptera
- Family: Geometridae
- Genus: Eois
- Species: E. stellataria

Binomial name
- Eois stellataria (Warren, 1907)

Synonyms
- Cambogia stellataria Warren, 1907

Species of moth

Eois stellataria is a moth in the family Geometridae. It is found in Peru.

The wingspan is about 24 mm. The forewings are dull chocolate brown, the costa and all the veins covered from the base to the margin by uniform pale yellow dots, representing a succession of pale lines. The hindwings are similar, but without prominent yellow spots. The basal half is speckled with pale.
