= Eois lilacina =

Scientific classification
- Kingdom: Animalia
- Phylum: Arthropoda
- Clade: Pancrustacea
- Class: Insecta
- Order: Lepidoptera
- Family: Geometridae
- Genus: Eois
- Species: E. lilacina

Binomial name
- Eois lilacina (Warren, 1904)

Synonyms
- Cambogia lilacina Warren, 1904; Cambogia inviolata Prout, 1910; Cambogia condensata Warren, 1907

Species of moth

Eois lilacina is a moth in the family Geometridae. It is found in Peru.

== Subspecies ==
- Eois lilacina lilacina (south-eastern Peru)
- Eois lilacina condensata (Warren, 1907) (Peru)
- Eois lilacina inviolata (Prout, 1910) (Peru)
