= Eois pallidicosta =

Scientific classification
- Kingdom: Animalia
- Phylum: Arthropoda
- Clade: Pancrustacea
- Class: Insecta
- Order: Lepidoptera
- Family: Geometridae
- Genus: Eois
- Species: E. pallidicosta

Binomial name
- Eois pallidicosta (Warren, 1907)

Synonyms
- Cambogia pallidicosta Warren, 1907

Species of moth

Eois pallidicosta is a moth in the family Geometridae. It is found in Peru.

The wingspan is about 26 mm. The forewings are red-brown, with a creamy grey costal streak with five dark speckles. The hindwings are paler towards the base and along the costa.
