= Eois binaria =

Scientific classification
- Kingdom: Animalia
- Phylum: Arthropoda
- Clade: Pancrustacea
- Class: Insecta
- Order: Lepidoptera
- Family: Geometridae
- Genus: Eois
- Species: E. binaria

Binomial name
- Eois binaria (Guenée, 1858)

Synonyms
- Cambogia binaria Guenée, 1858; Cidaria vitellaria Felder & Rogenhofer, 1875; Cambogia hyriata Snellen, 1874

Species of moth

Eois binaria is a moth in the family Geometridae. It is found in Brazil and Colombia.
