= Eois zenobia =

Scientific classification
- Kingdom: Animalia
- Phylum: Arthropoda
- Clade: Pancrustacea
- Class: Insecta
- Order: Lepidoptera
- Family: Geometridae
- Genus: Eois
- Species: E. zenobia

Binomial name
- Eois zenobia (Schaus, 1912)

Synonyms
- Cambogia zenobia Schaus, 1912

Species of moth

Eois zenobia is a moth in the family Geometridae first described by William Schaus in 1912. It is found in Costa Rica.
