= Eois aurata =

Scientific classification
- Kingdom: Animalia
- Phylum: Arthropoda
- Clade: Pancrustacea
- Class: Insecta
- Order: Lepidoptera
- Family: Geometridae
- Genus: Eois
- Species: E. aurata

Binomial name
- Eois aurata (Warren, 1897)

Synonyms
- Cambogia aurata Warren, 1897

Species of moth

Eois aurata is a moth in the family Geometridae. It is found in Suriname.
