= Eois undulosata =

Scientific classification
- Kingdom: Animalia
- Phylum: Arthropoda
- Clade: Pancrustacea
- Class: Insecta
- Order: Lepidoptera
- Family: Geometridae
- Genus: Eois
- Species: E. undulosata

Binomial name
- Eois undulosata (Warren, 1901)

Synonyms
- Cambogia undulosata Warren, 1901

Species of moth

Eois undulosata is a moth in the family Geometridae. It is found in Colombia and Costa Rica.
