= Eois diapsis =

Scientific classification
- Kingdom: Animalia
- Phylum: Arthropoda
- Clade: Pancrustacea
- Class: Insecta
- Order: Lepidoptera
- Family: Geometridae
- Genus: Eois
- Species: E. diapsis

Binomial name
- Eois diapsis Prout, 1932

Species of moth

Eois diapsis is a moth in the family Geometridae. It is found in Kenya.
