= Eois insueta =

Scientific classification
- Kingdom: Animalia
- Phylum: Arthropoda
- Clade: Pancrustacea
- Class: Insecta
- Order: Lepidoptera
- Family: Geometridae
- Genus: Eois
- Species: E. insueta

Binomial name
- Eois insueta (Schaus, 1912)

Synonyms
- Cambogia insueta Schaus, 1912

Species of moth

Eois insueta is a moth in the family Geometridae. It is found in Costa Rica.
