= Eois percisa =

Scientific classification
- Kingdom: Animalia
- Phylum: Arthropoda
- Clade: Pancrustacea
- Class: Insecta
- Order: Lepidoptera
- Family: Geometridae
- Genus: Eois
- Species: E. percisa

Binomial name
- Eois percisa (Warren, 1907)

Synonyms
- Cambogia percisa Warren, 1907

Species of moth

Eois percisa is a moth in the family Geometridae. It is found in Peru.

The wingspan is about 21 mm. The forewings are pale yellow, with lilac-grey wavy cross-lines parallel to the oblique outer margin. In the basal half of the wing (including the central fascia) these lines are thickened and confluent, obscuring the ground-colour except on the costa. The hindwings are similar to the forewings, but the basal third is grey and contains a large black cell-spot and a pale yellow band beyond it, which is visible (but less prominent) on the forewings also.
