= Eois filiferata =

Scientific classification
- Kingdom: Animalia
- Phylum: Arthropoda
- Clade: Pancrustacea
- Class: Insecta
- Order: Lepidoptera
- Family: Geometridae
- Genus: Eois
- Species: E. filiferata

Binomial name
- Eois filiferata (Dognin, 1912)

Synonyms
- Cambogia filiferata Dognin, 1912

Species of moth

Eois filiferata is a moth in the family Geometridae. It is found in Ecuador.
