= Eois obscura =

Scientific classification
- Kingdom: Animalia
- Phylum: Arthropoda
- Clade: Pancrustacea
- Class: Insecta
- Order: Lepidoptera
- Family: Geometridae
- Genus: Eois
- Species: E. obscura

Binomial name
- Eois obscura (Dognin, 1909)

Synonyms
- Cambogia obscura Dognin, 1909

Species of moth

Eois obscura is a moth in the family Geometridae. It is found in Colombia.
