= Eois biradiata =

Scientific classification
- Kingdom: Animalia
- Phylum: Arthropoda
- Clade: Pancrustacea
- Class: Insecta
- Order: Lepidoptera
- Family: Geometridae
- Genus: Eois
- Species: E. biradiata

Binomial name
- Eois biradiata (Dognin, 1911)

Synonyms
- Cambogia biradiata Dognin, 1911

Species of moth

Eois biradiata is a moth in the family Geometridae. It is found in Colombia and Ecuador.
