= Eois subangulata =

Scientific classification
- Kingdom: Animalia
- Phylum: Arthropoda
- Clade: Pancrustacea
- Class: Insecta
- Order: Lepidoptera
- Family: Geometridae
- Genus: Eois
- Species: E. subangulata

Binomial name
- Eois subangulata (Walker, 1861)

Synonyms
- Cambogia subangulata Walker, 1861

Species of moth

Eois subangulata is a moth in the family Geometridae. It is found in Brazil.
