= Eois isographata =

Scientific classification
- Kingdom: Animalia
- Phylum: Arthropoda
- Clade: Pancrustacea
- Class: Insecta
- Order: Lepidoptera
- Family: Geometridae
- Genus: Eois
- Species: E. isographata

Binomial name
- Eois isographata (Walker, 1863)

Synonyms
- Acidalia isographata Walker, 1863

Species of moth

Eois isographata is a moth in the family Geometridae. It is found in the Amazon region and on Cuba.
