= Eois cancellata =

Scientific classification
- Kingdom: Animalia
- Phylum: Arthropoda
- Clade: Pancrustacea
- Class: Insecta
- Order: Lepidoptera
- Family: Geometridae
- Genus: Eois
- Species: E. cancellata

Binomial name
- Eois cancellata (Warren, 1906)

Synonyms
- Cambogia cancellata Warren, 1906

Species of moth

Eois cancellata is a moth in the family Geometridae. It is found in south-eastern Peru.
