= Eois canariata =

Scientific classification
- Kingdom: Animalia
- Phylum: Arthropoda
- Clade: Pancrustacea
- Class: Insecta
- Order: Lepidoptera
- Family: Geometridae
- Genus: Eois
- Species: E. canariata

Binomial name
- Eois canariata (Dognin, 1903)

Synonyms
- Cambogia canariata Dognin, 1903

Species of moth

Eois canariata is a moth in the family Geometridae. It is found in Ecuador.
