= Eois subcrocearia =

Scientific classification
- Kingdom: Animalia
- Phylum: Arthropoda
- Clade: Pancrustacea
- Class: Insecta
- Order: Lepidoptera
- Family: Geometridae
- Genus: Eois
- Species: E. subcrocearia

Binomial name
- Eois subcrocearia (Snellen, 1874)

Synonyms
- Asthena subcrocearia Snellen, 1874

Species of moth

Eois subcrocearia is a moth in the family Geometridae. It is found in Colombia.
