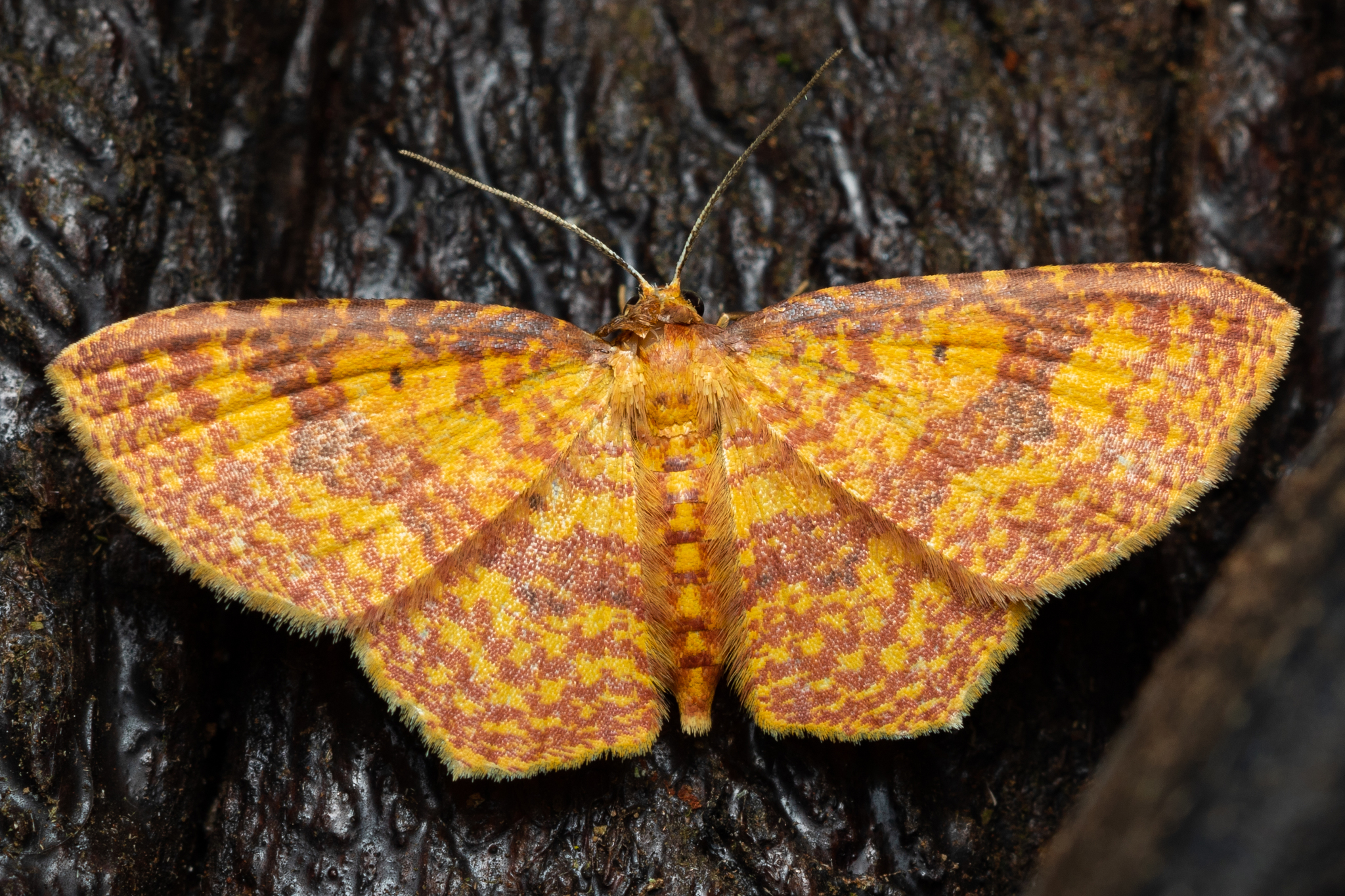

Scientific classification
- Kingdom: Animalia
- Phylum: Arthropoda
- Clade: Pancrustacea
- Class: Insecta
- Order: Lepidoptera
- Family: Geometridae
- Genus: Eois
- Species: E. nucula

Binomial name
- Eois nucula (Druce, 1892)

Synonyms
- Cambogia nucula Druce, 1892

= Eois nucula =

Species of moth

Eois nucula is a species of moth in the family Geometridae. It was first described by Druce in 1892 and is found in Panama.

The spelling "nucula and "necula" have both been used. The discrepancy is explained by Brehm et al.:

In their catalog of the geometrid moths of the world, Parsons et al. (1999) list Eois necula (Druce). However, the taxon necula is a Sterrhinae species belonging to the genus Tricentra Warren. The species name was apparently mixed up with the taxon nucula, described by Druce on the same page and depicted on the same plate as necula. The male holotype of nucula has so far not been labeled in the collection of the NHM and needs to be identified in future revisionary work. As judged from Druce's plate, the species belongs to the odatis (Druce) clade sensu Strutzenberger et al. (2010).
