= Eois nigrosticta =

Scientific classification
- Kingdom: Animalia
- Phylum: Arthropoda
- Clade: Pancrustacea
- Class: Insecta
- Order: Lepidoptera
- Family: Geometridae
- Genus: Eois
- Species: E. nigrosticta

Binomial name
- Eois nigrosticta (Warren, 1901)

Synonyms
- Cambogia nigrosticta Warren, 1901

Species of insect

Eois nigrosticta is a moth in the family Geometridae. It is found in Colombia.
