= Eois leucampyx =

Scientific classification
- Kingdom: Animalia
- Phylum: Arthropoda
- Clade: Pancrustacea
- Class: Insecta
- Order: Lepidoptera
- Family: Geometridae
- Genus: Eois
- Species: E. leucampyx

Binomial name
- Eois leucampyx Prout, 1926

Species of moth

Eois leucampyx is a moth in the family Geometridae. It is found on New Britain.
