= Eois nigrinotata =

Scientific classification
- Kingdom: Animalia
- Phylum: Arthropoda
- Clade: Pancrustacea
- Class: Insecta
- Order: Lepidoptera
- Family: Geometridae
- Genus: Eois
- Species: E. nigrinotata

Binomial name
- Eois nigrinotata (Warren, 1907)

Synonyms
- Cambogia nigrinotata Warren, 1907

Species of moth

Eois nigrinotata is a moth in the family Geometridae. It is found in Peru.

The wingspan is about 26 mm. The forewings are pale yellow, the veins and finer lines marked by orange-red scales. The hindwings have less distinct markings.
