= Eois cymatodes =

Scientific classification
- Kingdom: Animalia
- Phylum: Arthropoda
- Clade: Pancrustacea
- Class: Insecta
- Order: Lepidoptera
- Family: Geometridae
- Genus: Eois
- Species: E. cymatodes

Binomial name
- Eois cymatodes (Meyrick, 1886)

Synonyms
- Cretheis cymatodes Meyrick, 1886; Euchoeca iophrica Turner, 1907

Species of moth

Eois cymatodes is a moth in the Geometridae family, found on Vanuatu and in Queensland, Australia.
