= Eois obada =

Scientific classification
- Kingdom: Animalia
- Phylum: Arthropoda
- Clade: Pancrustacea
- Class: Insecta
- Order: Lepidoptera
- Family: Geometridae
- Genus: Eois
- Species: E. obada

Binomial name
- Eois obada (H. Druce, 1892)

Synonyms
- Cambogia obada H. Druce, 1892; Cambogia transsecta Warren, 1901

Species of moth

Eois obada is a moth in the family Geometridae first described by Herbert Druce in 1892. It is found in Mexico and Panama.

== Subspecies ==
- Eois obada obada (Mexico)
- Eois obada transsecta (Warren, 1901) (Panama)
