= Eois zorra =

Scientific classification
- Kingdom: Animalia
- Phylum: Arthropoda
- Clade: Pancrustacea
- Class: Insecta
- Order: Lepidoptera
- Family: Geometridae
- Genus: Eois
- Species: E. zorra

Binomial name
- Eois zorra (Dognin, 1896)

Synonyms
- Anisodes zorra Dognin, 1896

Species of moth

Eois zorra is a moth in the family Geometridae. It is found in Ecuador.
