= Eois russearia =

Scientific classification
- Kingdom: Animalia
- Phylum: Arthropoda
- Clade: Pancrustacea
- Class: Insecta
- Order: Lepidoptera
- Family: Geometridae
- Genus: Eois
- Species: E. russearia

Binomial name
- Eois russearia Hubner, 1818

Species of moth

Eois russearia is a moth in the family Geometridae. It is found in Suriname.
