= Eois obliviosa =

Scientific classification
- Kingdom: Animalia
- Phylum: Arthropoda
- Clade: Pancrustacea
- Class: Insecta
- Order: Lepidoptera
- Family: Geometridae
- Genus: Eois
- Species: E. obliviosa

Binomial name
- Eois obliviosa Holloway, 1997

Species of moth

Eois obliviosa is a moth in the family Geometridae. It is found on Borneo. The habitat consists of lowland forests and lower montane forests.

The length of the forewings is 10–11 mm.
