= Eois cedon =

Scientific classification
- Kingdom: Animalia
- Phylum: Arthropoda
- Clade: Pancrustacea
- Class: Insecta
- Order: Lepidoptera
- Family: Geometridae
- Genus: Eois
- Species: E. cedon

Binomial name
- Eois cedon (H. Druce, 1892)

Synonyms
- Cambogia cedon H. Druce, 1892; Cambogia particolor Warren, 1895

Species of moth

Eois cedon is a moth in the family Geometridae first described by Herbert Druce in 1892. It is found in Guatemala.
