= Eois willotti =

Scientific classification
- Kingdom: Animalia
- Phylum: Arthropoda
- Clade: Pancrustacea
- Class: Insecta
- Order: Lepidoptera
- Family: Geometridae
- Genus: Eois
- Species: E. willotti

Binomial name
- Eois willotti Holloway, 1997

Species of moth

Eois willotti is a moth in the family Geometridae. It is found on Borneo. The habitat consists of lowland forests, including dipterocarp forests and heath forests.

The length of the forewings is 9–10 mm. The wings are yellow, strongly fasciated with red.
