= Eois albosignata =

Scientific classification
- Kingdom: Animalia
- Phylum: Arthropoda
- Clade: Pancrustacea
- Class: Insecta
- Order: Lepidoptera
- Family: Geometridae
- Genus: Eois
- Species: E. albosignata

Binomial name
- Eois albosignata (Dognin, 1911)

Synonyms
- Cambogia albosignata Dognin, 1911

Species of moth

Eois albosignata is a moth in the family Geometridae. It is found in Colombia.
