= Eois apyraria =

Scientific classification
- Kingdom: Animalia
- Phylum: Arthropoda
- Clade: Pancrustacea
- Class: Insecta
- Order: Lepidoptera
- Family: Geometridae
- Genus: Eois
- Species: E. apyraria

Binomial name
- Eois apyraria (Guenée, 1858)

Synonyms
- Cambogia apyraria Guenée, 1858

Species of moth

Eois apyraria is a moth in the family Geometridae. It is found in French Guiana.
