= Eois expressaria =

Scientific classification
- Kingdom: Animalia
- Phylum: Arthropoda
- Clade: Pancrustacea
- Class: Insecta
- Order: Lepidoptera
- Family: Geometridae
- Genus: Eois
- Species: E. expressaria

Binomial name
- Eois expressaria (Walker, 1861)

Synonyms
- Acidalia expressaria Walker, 1861

Species of moth

Eois expressaria is a moth in the family Geometridae. It is found in Honduras.
