= Eois ephyrata =

Scientific classification
- Kingdom: Animalia
- Phylum: Arthropoda
- Clade: Pancrustacea
- Class: Insecta
- Order: Lepidoptera
- Family: Geometridae
- Genus: Eois
- Species: E. ephyrata

Binomial name
- Eois ephyrata (Walker, 1863)

Synonyms
- Acidalia ephyrata Walker, 1863

Species of moth

Eois ephyrata is a moth of the Geometridae family. It is found on Borneo island. The habitat consists of low elevation dipterocarp forests.
