= Eois discata =

Scientific classification
- Kingdom: Animalia
- Phylum: Arthropoda
- Clade: Pancrustacea
- Class: Insecta
- Order: Lepidoptera
- Family: Geometridae
- Genus: Eois
- Species: E. discata

Binomial name
- Eois discata (Warren, 1898)

Synonyms
- Pseudasthena discata Warren, 1898

Species of moth

Eois discata is a moth in the family Geometridae. It is found in Singapore and on Borneo and Bali.
