= Eois carnana =

Scientific classification
- Kingdom: Animalia
- Phylum: Arthropoda
- Clade: Pancrustacea
- Class: Insecta
- Order: Lepidoptera
- Family: Geometridae
- Genus: Eois
- Species: E. carnana

Binomial name
- Eois carnana (H. Druce, 1892)

Synonyms
- Asthena carnana H. Druce, 1892

Species of moth

Eois carnana is a moth in the family Geometridae first described by Herbert Druce in 1892. It is found in Guatemala and Brazil.

== Subspecies ==
- Eois carnana carnana (Guatemala)
- Eois carnana aberrans Prout, 1922 (Brazil)
