= Eois rectifasciata =

Scientific classification
- Kingdom: Animalia
- Phylum: Arthropoda
- Clade: Pancrustacea
- Class: Insecta
- Order: Lepidoptera
- Family: Geometridae
- Genus: Eois
- Species: E. rectifasciata

Binomial name
- Eois rectifasciata D. S. Fletcher, 1958

Species of moth

Eois rectifasciata is a moth in the family Geometridae. It was described by David Stephen Fletcher in 1958. It is found in Uganda.
