= Eois punctifera =

Scientific classification
- Kingdom: Animalia
- Phylum: Arthropoda
- Clade: Pancrustacea
- Class: Insecta
- Order: Lepidoptera
- Family: Geometridae
- Genus: Eois
- Species: E. punctifera

Binomial name
- Eois punctifera (Dognin, 1911)

Synonyms
- Cambogia punctifera Dognin, 1911

Species of moth

Eois punctifera is a moth in the family Geometridae. It is found in Colombia.
