= Eois borrata =

Scientific classification
- Kingdom: Animalia
- Phylum: Arthropoda
- Clade: Pancrustacea
- Class: Insecta
- Order: Lepidoptera
- Family: Geometridae
- Genus: Eois
- Species: E. borrata

Binomial name
- Eois borrata (Dognin, 1893)

Synonyms
- Cambogia borrata Dognin, 1893

Species of moth

Eois borrata is a moth in the family Geometridae. It is found in Ecuador.
