= Eois sanguilinea =

Scientific classification
- Kingdom: Animalia
- Phylum: Arthropoda
- Clade: Pancrustacea
- Class: Insecta
- Order: Lepidoptera
- Family: Geometridae
- Genus: Eois
- Species: E. sanguilinea

Binomial name
- Eois sanguilinea (Warren, 1895)

Synonyms
- Cambogia sanguilinea Warren, 1895

Species of moth

Eois sanguilinea is a moth in the family Geometridae. It is found on St. George's Island, Bermuda.
