= Eois muscosa =

Scientific classification
- Kingdom: Animalia
- Phylum: Arthropoda
- Clade: Pancrustacea
- Class: Insecta
- Order: Lepidoptera
- Family: Geometridae
- Genus: Eois
- Species: E. muscosa

Binomial name
- Eois muscosa (Dognin, 1910)

Synonyms
- Hydata muscosa Dognin, 1910

Species of moth

Eois muscosa is a moth in the family Geometridae. It is found in Colombia.
