= Eois furvibasis =

Scientific classification
- Kingdom: Animalia
- Phylum: Arthropoda
- Clade: Pancrustacea
- Class: Insecta
- Order: Lepidoptera
- Family: Geometridae
- Genus: Eois
- Species: E. furvibasis

Binomial name
- Eois furvibasis (Dognin, 1914)

Synonyms
- Amaurinia furvibasis Dognin, 1914

Species of moth

Eois furvibasis is a moth in the family Geometridae.

It is found in Colombia.
