= Eois adimaria =

Scientific classification
- Kingdom: Animalia
- Phylum: Arthropoda
- Clade: Pancrustacea
- Class: Insecta
- Order: Lepidoptera
- Family: Geometridae
- Genus: Eois
- Species: E. adimaria

Binomial name
- Eois adimaria (Snellen, 1874)

Synonyms
- Cambogia adimaria Snellen, 1874; Acidalia argentifilata Felder & Rogenhofer, 1875

Species of moth

Eois adimaria is a moth in the family Geometridae. It is found in Colombia.
