= Eois muscularia =

Scientific classification
- Kingdom: Animalia
- Phylum: Arthropoda
- Clade: Pancrustacea
- Class: Insecta
- Order: Lepidoptera
- Family: Geometridae
- Genus: Eois
- Species: E. muscularia

Binomial name
- Eois muscularia (Dognin, 1900)

Synonyms
- Cambogia muscularia Dognin, 1900

Species of moth

Eois muscularia is a moth in the family Geometridae. It is found in Bolivia.
