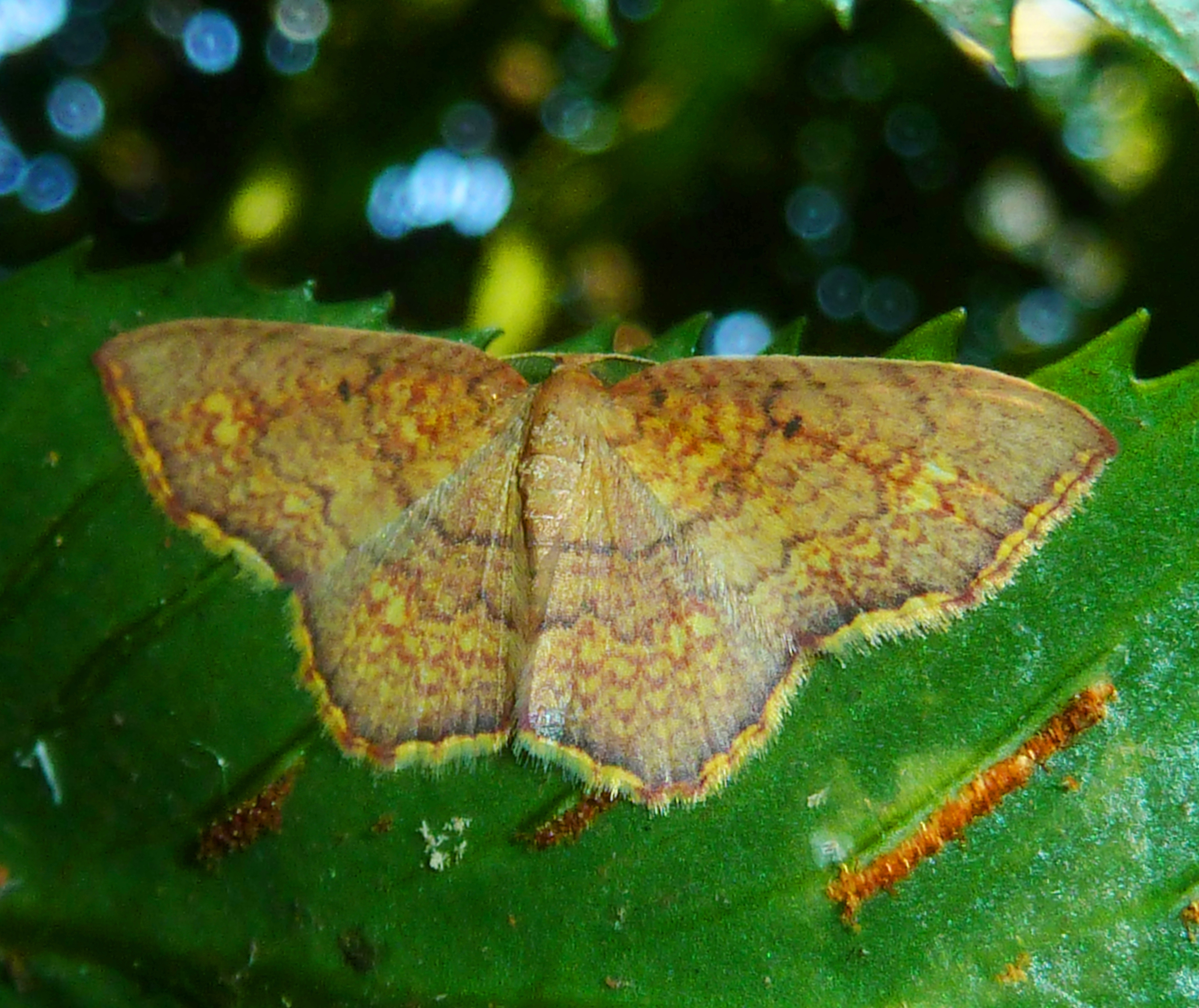
- Eois grataria ab. mediofusca in South Africa

Scientific classification
- Kingdom: Animalia
- Phylum: Arthropoda
- Class: Insecta
- Order: Lepidoptera
- Family: Geometridae
- Tribe: Asthenini
- Genus: Eois; Hübner, 1818

Synonyms
- Amaurinia Guenée, 1857; Amphibatodes Warren, 1895; Anthyria Swinhoe, 1892; Bardanes Moore, 1888; Cambogia Guenée, 1857; Cretheis Meyrick, 1886; Phrudoplaga Warren, 1894; Prasinoscia Warren, 1905; Pseudasthena Moore, 1887; Psilocambogia Hampson, 1893; Synthalia Warren, 1902

= Eois =

Genus of moths

Eois is a genus of tropical moths in the family Geometridae. It was first described by Jacob Hübner in 1818. Caterpillars of Eois species are most commonly green with darker markings, but species with fully dark caterpillars also exist. They are specialized feeders associated with Piperaceae species, with sparse additional records on Chloranthaceae species. Adults are typically small, with diverse wing shape, color and patterning across the genus.

== Species ==
As of February 2024, the genus contains 267 validly described species, 220 from the Neotropical region and the remainder from Old World tropical areas in Africa and Asia. An estimated additional 1000 Neotropical species remain thus far undescribed.

Scientific name	Describer	Year described
Eois abbreviata	(Dognin	1906)
Eois acerba	(Dognin	1900)
Eois adimaria	(Snellen	1874)
Eois agroica	(Dyar	1913)
Eois albigrisea	(Dognin	1913)
Eois albosignata	(Dognin	1911)
Eois alticola	(Aurivillius	1925)
Eois amarillada	(Dognin	1893)
Eois amaryllaria	(Schaus	1901)
Eois ambarilla	(Dognin	1893)
Eois amydroscia	L. B. Prout	1922
Eois angulata	(Warren	1904)
Eois anisorrhopa	L. B. Prout	1933
Eois antiopata	(Warren	1904)
Eois apyraria	(Guenée	1858)
Eois arenacea	(Dognin	1912)
Eois atrostrigata	(Warren	1894)
Eois aurata	(Warren	1897)
Eois auruda	(Dognin	1900))
Eois azafranata	(Dognin	1893)
Eois basaliata	(Warren	1907)
Eois batea	H. Druce	1892
Eois beebei	(Fletcher	1952)
Eois bellissima	(Warren	1904)
Eois bermellada	(Dognin	1893)
Eois bifilata	(Warren	1895)
Eois binaria	(Guenée	1858)
Eois biradiata	(Dognin	1911)
Eois bitaeniata	(L. B. Prout	1910)
Eois bolana	(Dognin	1899)
Eois boliviensis	(Dognin	1900)
Eois borrata	(Dognin	1893)
Eois borratoides	(L. B. Prout	1910)
Eois brasiliensis	L. B. Prout	1933
Eois brunnea	(Warren	1904)
Eois brunneicosta	(Dognin	1916)
Eois burla	(Dognin	1899)
Eois camptographata	L. B. Prout	1922
Eois canariata	(Dognin	1903)
Eois cancellata	(Warren	1906)
Eois carmenta	(H. Druce	1892)
Eois carnana	(H. Druce	1892)
Eois carrasca	(Dognin	1899)
Eois cassandra	H. Druce	1892
Eois catana	H. Druce	1892
Eois cedon	(H. Druce	1892)
Eois cellulata	(L. B. Prout	1910)
Eois cervina	(Warren	1901)
Eois chasca	(Dognin	1899)
Eois chione	L. B. Prout	1933
Eois chrysocraspedata	(Warren	1897)
Eois cinerascens	(Warren	1907)
Eois ciocolatina	(Warren	1907)
Eois citriaria	(Schaus	1912)
Eois cobardata	(Dognin	1893)
Eois coerulea	(Warren	1905)
Eois cogitata	(Dognin	1918)
Eois coloraria	(Schaus	1901)
Eois commixta	(Warren	1904)
Eois concatenata	(L. B. Prout	1910)
Eois consocia	(Warren	1897)
Eois contractata	(Walker	1861)
Eois contraversa	(Warren	1907)
Eois costalaria	(Schaus	1901)
Eois crocina	(Schaus	1912)
Eois cymatodes	(Meyrick	1886)
Eois decursaria	(Moschler	1886)
Eois deleta	(Schaus	1912)
Eois delicatula	(Warren	1904)
Eois diapsis	L. B. Prout	1932
Eois dibapha	(Schaus	1912)
Eois dione	(Schaus	1912)
Eois discata	(Warren	1898)
Eois dissensa	(Schaus	1912)
Eois dissimilaris	(Moore,	1887)
Eois dissimilis	(Moore	1887)
Eois diversicosta	(L. B. Prout	1911)
Eois dorisaria	(Schaus	1913)
Eois dryantis	(Schaus	1912)
Eois dryope	(Schaus	1912)
Eois elongata	(Schaus	1912)
Eois encina	(Dognin	1899)
Eois ephyrata	(Walker	1863)
Eois escamata	(Dognin	1893)
Eois ewa	Moraes & Stanton	2021
Eois expressaria	(Walker	1861)
Eois fasciata	(Warren	1901)
Eois filiferata	(Dognin	1912)
Eois flavata	(Warren	1896)
Eois flavifulva	(Warren	1904)
Eois flavotaeniata	(Warren	1895)
Eois fragilis	(Warren	1900)
Eois fucosa	(Dognin	1912)
Eois fulva	(L. B. Prout	1910)
Eois fulvicosta	(Dognin	1912)
Eois funiculata	(Warren	1904)
Eois furvibasis	(Dognin	1914)
Eois fuscicosta	(Dognin	1912)
Eois gemellaria	(Guenée	1858)
Eois glauculata	(Walker	1863)
Eois golosata	(Dognin	1893)
Eois goodmani	(Schaus	1913)
Eois grataria	(Walker	1861)
Eois griseicosta	(Warren	1904)
Eois guapa	(Schaus	1912)
Eois haematodes	(Warren	1907)
Eois haltima	(Schaus	1901)
Eois heliadaria	(Guenée	1857)
Eois hermosaria	(Schaus	1901)
Eois heza	(Dognin	1899)
Eois hocica	(Dognin	1899)
Eois hulaquina	(Dyar	1914)
Eois hyperythraria	(Guenée	1857)
Eois ignefumata	(Dognin	1910)
Eois imitata	(Warren	1907)
Eois impletaria	(Walker	1866)
Eois incandescens	Herbulot	1954
Eois inconspicua	(Warren	1907)
Eois inflammata	(Dognin	1911)
Eois ingrataria	(Warren	1898)
Eois insignata	(Walker	1861)
Eois insolens	(Warren	1905)
Eois insolita	(Dognin	1913)
Eois insueta	(Schaus	1912)
Eois intacta	(Warren	1904)
Eois internexa	Dognin	1911
Eois isabella	(Schaus	1901)
Eois isographata	(Walker	1863)
Eois jifia	(Dognin	1899)
Eois lavendula	(Warren	1907)
Eois lavinia	(Schaus	1912)
Eois leucampyx	L. B. Prout	1926
Eois lilacea	(Dognin	1909)
Eois lilacina	(Warren	1904)
Eois lineolata	(Warren	1897)
Eois lucivittata	(Warren	1907)
Eois lunatissima	(Schaus	1915)
Eois lunifera	(Dognin	1912)
Eois lunulosa	(Moore	1887)
Eois macrozeta	Herbulot	1988
Eois marcearia	(Guenée	1858)
Eois margarita	(Dognin	1911)
Eois mediogrisea	(Dognin	1914)
Eois mediostrigata	(Warren	1907)
Eois memorata	(Walker	1861)
Eois mexicaria	(Walker	1866)
Eois mictographa	L. B. Prout	1933
Eois mixosemia	L. B. Prout	1926
Eois multilunata	(Dognin	1912)
Eois multistrigaria	Warren	1901
Eois muscosa	(Dognin	1910)
Eois muscularia	(Dognin	1900)
Eois myrrha	(Schaus	1912)
Eois nacara	(Schaus	1901)
Eois naias	(Schaus	1912)
Eois neclas	(H. Druce	1892)
Eois neutraria	(Guenée	1858)
Eois nigriceps	(Warren	1907)
Eois nigricosta	L. B. Prout	1926
Eois nigrinotata	(Warren	1907)
Eois nigriplaga	(Warren	1897)
Eois nigrosticta	(Warren	1901)
Eois nucula	(H. Druce	1892)
Eois numeria	(H. Druce	1892)
Eois numida	(H. Druce	1892)
Eois nundina	H. Druce	1892
Eois nympha	(Schaus	1912)
Eois obada	(H. Druce	1892)
Eois obliviosa	Holloway	1997
Eois obscura	(Dognin	1909)
Eois occia	(H. Druce	1892)
Eois odatis	(H. Druce	1892)
Eois olivacea	(C. Felder & Rogenhofer	1875)
Eois olivaria	(Schaus	1901)
Eois operbula	(Dyar	1913)
Eois ops	H. Druce	1892
Eois oressigenes	L. B. Prout	1921
Eois oxum	Moraes & Freitas	2021
Eois oya	Moraes & Montebello	2021
Eois pallidicosta	(Warren	1907)
Eois pallidula	(Warren	1896)
Eois pararussearia	Dognin	1901
Eois paraviolascens	(Dognin	1900)
Eois parumsimii	Doan	2024
Eois parva	(Dognin	1918)
Eois paulona	(Schaus	1927)
Eois percisa	(Warren	1907)
Eois perfusca	Herbulot	1988
Eois perstrigata	(Warren	1907)
Eois peruviensis	(Schaus	1901)
Eois phaneroscia	L. B. Prout	1922
Eois plana	(Dognin	1918)
Eois planetaria	(Warren	1907)
Eois planifimbria	L. B. Prout	1922
Eois platearia	(Schaus	1901)
Eois plicata	(Moore	1888)
Eois plumbacea	(Warren	1894)
Eois plumbeofusa	(Warren	1901)
Eois polycyma	(West	1930)
Eois primularis	L. B. Prout	1922
Eois pseudobada	(Dognin	1918)
Eois pseudolivacea	Doan	2024
Eois punctata	(Dognin	1913)
Eois punctifera	(Dognin	1911)
Eois pyrauges	L. B. Prout	1927
Eois quadrilatera	(Dognin	1895)
Eois rectifasciata	D. S. Fletcher	1958
Eois reducta	Herbulot	1988
Eois relaxaria	(Snellen	1874)
Eois restrictata	(Warren	1901)
Eois reticulata	(Schaus	1901)
Eois roseocincta	(Warren	1908)
Eois rubiada	(Dognin	1893)
Eois rubicunda	(Dognin	1912)
Eois russearia	Hübner	1818
Eois sagittaria	(Snellen	1874)
Eois sanguilinea	(Warren	1895)
Eois sanguilineata	(Warren	1901)
Eois saria	(Dyar	1913)
Eois scama	(Dognin	1899)
Eois semipicta	(Warren	1897)
Eois semirosea	(Dognin	1913)
Eois semirubra	(Warren	1896)
Eois seria	(Dognin	1900)
Eois serrilineata	(L. B. Prout	1910)
Eois signaria	(Schaus	1901)
Eois silla	(Dognin	1899)
Eois simulata	(Dognin	1911)
Eois singularia	(Schaus	1901)
Eois snellenaria	(Moschler	1882)
Eois sordida	(Warren	1897)
Eois stellataria	(Warren	1907)
Eois suarezensis	(L. B. Prout	1923)
Eois subangulata	(Walker	1861)
Eois subcrocearia	(Snellen	1874)
Eois subpallida	(Dognin	1913)
Eois subtectata	(Walker	1861)
Eois sundasimilis	Holloway	1997
Eois tegularia	(Guenée	1858)
Eois telegraphica	L. B. Prout	1933
Eois tertulia	(Dognin	1893)
Eois tessellata	(Warren	1897)
Eois thetisaria	(Schaus	1913)
Eois tiebaghi	Holloway	1979
Eois toporata	(Schaus	1901)
Eois trillista	(Warren	1905)
Eois trinotata	(Warren	1895)
Eois undulosaria	(Warren	1897)
Eois undulosata	(Warren	1901)
Eois veniliata	(Walker	1861)
Eois verisimilis	L. B. Prout	1922
Eois versata	(Walker	1861)
Eois vinosata	(Warren	1907)
Eois violada	(Dognin	1899)
Eois warreni	(Dognin	1914)
Eois willotti	Holloway	1997
Eois xanthoperata	(Warren	1897)
Eois yvata	(Dognin	1893)
Eois zenobia	(Schaus	1912)
Eois zorra	(Dognin	1896)
