= Eois perstrigata =

Scientific classification
- Kingdom: Animalia
- Phylum: Arthropoda
- Clade: Pancrustacea
- Class: Insecta
- Order: Lepidoptera
- Family: Geometridae
- Genus: Eois
- Species: E. perstrigata

Binomial name
- Eois perstrigata (Warren, 1907)

Synonyms
- Cambogia perstrigata Warren, 1907

Species of moth

Eois perstrigata is a moth in the family Geometridae. It is found in Peru.

The wingspan is about 26 mm. The forewings are pale lilac-grey along the costa and pale brick-red below, with fine dark speckling. The lines are dark brown and consist of two basal and an antemedian line. The hindwings are brick-red with four lines.
