= Eois pseudobada =

Scientific classification
- Kingdom: Animalia
- Phylum: Arthropoda
- Clade: Pancrustacea
- Class: Insecta
- Order: Lepidoptera
- Family: Geometridae
- Genus: Eois
- Species: E. pseudobada

Binomial name
- Eois pseudobada (Dognin, 1918)

Synonyms
- Cambogia pseudobada Dognin, 1918

Species of moth

Eois pseudobada is a moth in the family Geometridae, subfamily Larentiinae. It is found in Ecuador.
