= Eois tiebaghi =

Scientific classification
- Kingdom: Animalia
- Phylum: Arthropoda
- Clade: Pancrustacea
- Class: Insecta
- Order: Lepidoptera
- Family: Geometridae
- Genus: Eois
- Species: E. tiebaghi

Binomial name
- Eois tiebaghi Holloway, 1979

Species of moth

Eois tiebaghi is a moth in the family Geometridae. It is found in New Caledonia.
