= Eois planetaria =

Scientific classification
- Kingdom: Animalia
- Phylum: Arthropoda
- Clade: Pancrustacea
- Class: Insecta
- Order: Lepidoptera
- Family: Geometridae
- Genus: Eois
- Species: E. planetaria

Binomial name
- Eois planetaria (Warren, 1907)

Synonyms
- Cambogia planetaria Warren, 1907; Cambogia albimacula Dognin, 1911

Species of moth

Eois planetaria is a moth in the family Geometridae. It is found in Peru.

The wingspan is about 27 mm. The forewings are reddish fawn, crossed from the base to the margin by a series of round white dots on the veins, representing the transverse lines. The hindwings are similar, but the basal area is not spotted and the spots towards the margin are all larger.

== Subspecies ==
- Eois planetaria planetaria
- Eois planetaria albimacula (Dognin, 1911)
