= Eois goodmani =

Scientific classification
- Kingdom: Animalia
- Phylum: Arthropoda
- Clade: Pancrustacea
- Class: Insecta
- Order: Lepidoptera
- Family: Geometridae
- Genus: Eois
- Species: E. goodmani

Binomial name
- Eois goodmani (Schaus, 1913)

Synonyms
- Amaurinia goodmani Schaus, 1913; Amaurinia viridiflava Dognin, 1918

Species of moth

Eois goodmani is a moth in the family Geometridae. It is found in Costa Rica and Colombia.
