= Eois abbreviata =

Scientific classification
- Kingdom: Animalia
- Phylum: Arthropoda
- Clade: Pancrustacea
- Class: Insecta
- Order: Lepidoptera
- Family: Geometridae
- Genus: Eois
- Species: E. abbreviata

Binomial name
- Eois abbreviata (Dognin, 1906)

Synonyms
- Cambogia abbreviata Dognin, 1906

Species of moth

Eois abbreviata is a moth in the family Geometridae. It is found in Peru.
