= Eois insignata =

Scientific classification
- Kingdom: Animalia
- Phylum: Arthropoda
- Clade: Pancrustacea
- Class: Insecta
- Order: Lepidoptera
- Family: Geometridae
- Genus: Eois
- Species: E. insignata

Binomial name
- Eois insignata (Walker, 1861)

Synonyms
- Cambogia insignata Walker, 1861

Species of moth

Eois insignata is a moth in the family Geometridae. It is found in Venezuela and Honduras.
