= Eois semipicta =

Scientific classification
- Kingdom: Animalia
- Phylum: Arthropoda
- Clade: Pancrustacea
- Class: Insecta
- Order: Lepidoptera
- Family: Geometridae
- Genus: Eois
- Species: E. semipicta

Binomial name
- Eois semipicta (Warren, 1897)

Synonyms
- Cambogia semipicta Warren, 1897

Species of moth

Eois semipicta is a moth in the family Geometridae. It is found in Brazil.
