= Eois dorisaria =

Scientific classification
- Kingdom: Animalia
- Phylum: Arthropoda
- Clade: Pancrustacea
- Class: Insecta
- Order: Lepidoptera
- Family: Geometridae
- Genus: Eois
- Species: E. dorisaria

Binomial name
- Eois dorisaria (Schaus, 1913)

Synonyms
- Amaurinia dorisaria Schaus, 1913

Species of moth

Eois dorisaria is a moth in the family Geometridae. It is found in Costa Rica.
