= Eois olivacea =

Scientific classification
- Kingdom: Animalia
- Phylum: Arthropoda
- Clade: Pancrustacea
- Class: Insecta
- Order: Lepidoptera
- Family: Geometridae
- Genus: Eois
- Species: E. olivacea

Binomial name
- Eois olivacea (C. Felder, R. Felder & Rogenhofer, 1875)

Synonyms
- Jodis olivacea Felder & Rogenhofer, 1875; Amaurinia auruda Dognin, 1900; Racheospila beebei D. S. Fletcher, 1952

Species of moth

Eois olivacea is a moth in the family Geometridae. It is found in Colombia, Ecuador and Venezuela.
