= Eois atrostrigata =

Scientific classification
- Kingdom: Animalia
- Phylum: Arthropoda
- Class: Insecta
- Order: Lepidoptera
- Family: Geometridae
- Genus: Eois
- Species: E. atrostrigata

Binomial name
- Eois atrostrigata (Warren, 1894)

Synonyms
- Epicyme atrostrigata Warren, 1894; Asthena porphyretica Lower, 1896

Species of moth

Eois atrostrigata is a moth in the family Geometridae. It is found in Australia (Queensland).
