= Eois angulata =

Scientific classification
- Kingdom: Animalia
- Phylum: Arthropoda
- Clade: Pancrustacea
- Class: Insecta
- Order: Lepidoptera
- Family: Geometridae
- Genus: Eois
- Species: E. angulata

Binomial name
- Eois angulata (Warren, 1904)

Synonyms
- Amaurinia angulata Warren, 1904

Species of moth

Eois angulata is a moth in the family Geometridae. It is found in south-eastern Peru and Ecuador.
