= Eois restrictata =

Scientific classification
- Kingdom: Animalia
- Phylum: Arthropoda
- Clade: Pancrustacea
- Class: Insecta
- Order: Lepidoptera
- Family: Geometridae
- Genus: Eois
- Species: E. restrictata

Binomial name
- Eois restrictata (Warren, 1901)

Synonyms
- Cambogia restrictata Warren, 1901; Cambogia cinyras Schaus, 1912

Species of moth

Eois restrictata is a moth in the family Geometridae. It is found in Panama and Costa Rica.
