= Eois semirubra =

Scientific classification
- Kingdom: Animalia
- Phylum: Arthropoda
- Clade: Pancrustacea
- Class: Insecta
- Order: Lepidoptera
- Family: Geometridae
- Genus: Eois
- Species: E. semirubra

Binomial name
- Eois semirubra (Warren, 1896)

Synonyms
- Psilocambogia semirubra Warren, 1896

Species of moth

Eois semirubra is a moth in the family Geometridae. It is found in New Guinea.
