= Eois relaxaria =

Scientific classification
- Kingdom: Animalia
- Phylum: Arthropoda
- Clade: Pancrustacea
- Class: Insecta
- Order: Lepidoptera
- Family: Geometridae
- Genus: Eois
- Species: E. relaxaria

Binomial name
- Eois relaxaria (Snellen, 1874)

Synonyms
- Asthena relaxaria Snellen, 1874

Species of moth

Eois relaxaria is a moth in the family Geometridae. It is found in Colombia.
