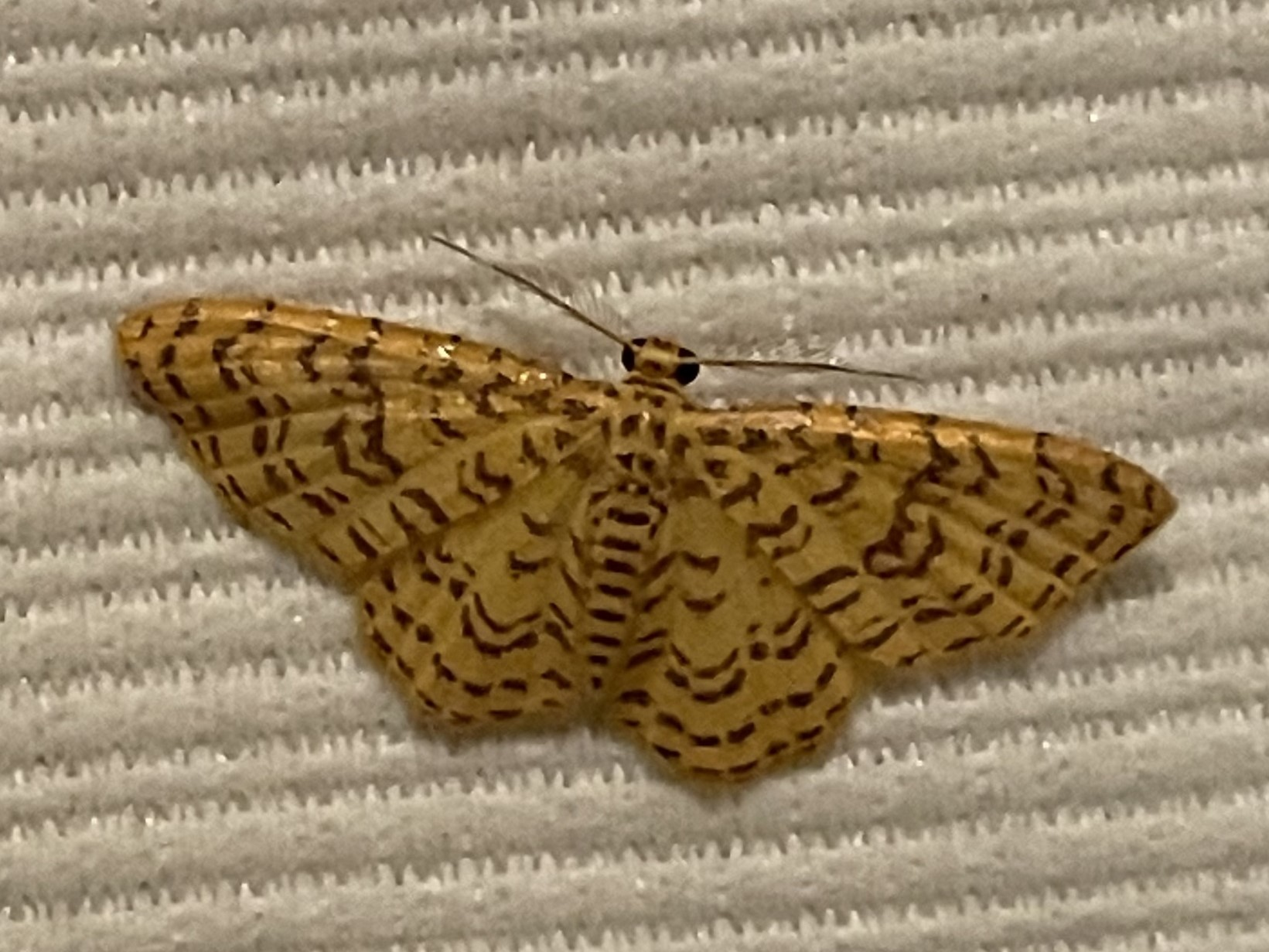

Scientific classification
- Kingdom: Animalia
- Phylum: Arthropoda
- Clade: Pancrustacea
- Class: Insecta
- Order: Lepidoptera
- Family: Geometridae
- Genus: Eois
- Species: E. platearia

Binomial name
- Eois platearia (Schaus, 1901)

Synonyms
- Cambogia platearia Schaus, 1901

= Eois platearia =

Species of moth

Eois platearia is a species of moth in the family Geometridae. The type locality is in Brazil.
