= Eois scama =

Scientific classification
- Kingdom: Animalia
- Phylum: Arthropoda
- Clade: Pancrustacea
- Class: Insecta
- Order: Lepidoptera
- Family: Geometridae
- Genus: Eois
- Species: E. scama

Binomial name
- Eois scama (Dognin, 1899)

Synonyms
- Cambogia scama Dognin, 1899

Species of moth

Eois scama is a moth in the family Geometridae. It is found in Ecuador.
