= Eois hulaquina =

Scientific classification
- Kingdom: Animalia
- Phylum: Arthropoda
- Clade: Pancrustacea
- Class: Insecta
- Order: Lepidoptera
- Family: Geometridae
- Genus: Eois
- Species: E. hulaquina

Binomial name
- Eois hulaquina (Dyar, 1914)

Synonyms
- Cambogia hulaquina Dyar, 1914

Species of moth

Eois hulaquina is a moth in the family Geometridae. It is found in Panama.
