= Eois cinerascens =

Scientific classification
- Kingdom: Animalia
- Phylum: Arthropoda
- Clade: Pancrustacea
- Class: Insecta
- Order: Lepidoptera
- Family: Geometridae
- Genus: Eois
- Species: E. cinerascens

Binomial name
- Eois cinerascens (Warren, 1907)

Synonyms
- Cambogia cinerascens Warren, 1907

Species of moth

Eois cinerascens is a moth in the family Geometridae. It is found in Peru.
