= Eois multilunata =

Scientific classification
- Kingdom: Animalia
- Phylum: Arthropoda
- Clade: Pancrustacea
- Class: Insecta
- Order: Lepidoptera
- Family: Geometridae
- Genus: Eois
- Species: E. multilunata

Binomial name
- Eois multilunata (Dognin, 1912)

Synonyms
- Cambogia multilunata Dognin, 1912

Species of moth

Eois multilunata is a moth in the family Geometridae. It is found in Colombia and Costa Rica.
