= Eois boliviensis =

Scientific classification
- Kingdom: Animalia
- Phylum: Arthropoda
- Clade: Pancrustacea
- Class: Insecta
- Order: Lepidoptera
- Family: Geometridae
- Genus: Eois
- Species: E. boliviensis

Binomial name
- Eois boliviensis (Dognin, 1900)

Synonyms
- Thalassodes boliviensis Dognin, 1900

Species of moth

Eois boliviensis is a moth in the family Geometridae. It is found in Bolivia.
