= Eois paulona =

Scientific classification
- Kingdom: Animalia
- Phylum: Arthropoda
- Clade: Pancrustacea
- Class: Insecta
- Order: Lepidoptera
- Family: Geometridae
- Genus: Eois
- Species: E. paulona

Binomial name
- Eois paulona (Schaus, 1927)

Synonyms
- Cambogia paulona Schaus, 1927

Species of moth

Eois paulona is a moth in the family Geometridae. Eois paulona is most often found in the eastern region of the Andes mountain range.
