= Eois bifilata =

Scientific classification
- Kingdom: Animalia
- Phylum: Arthropoda
- Clade: Pancrustacea
- Class: Insecta
- Order: Lepidoptera
- Family: Geometridae
- Genus: Eois
- Species: E. bifilata

Binomial name
- Eois bifilata (Warren, 1895)

Synonyms
- Cambogia bifilata Warren, 1895

Species of moth

Eois bifilata is a moth in the family Geometridae. It is found in Brazil.
