= Eois subtectata =

Scientific classification
- Kingdom: Animalia
- Phylum: Arthropoda
- Clade: Pancrustacea
- Class: Insecta
- Order: Lepidoptera
- Family: Geometridae
- Genus: Eois
- Species: E. subtectata

Binomial name
- Eois subtectata (Walker, 1861)

Synonyms
- Hyria subtectata Walker, 1861

Species of moth

Eois subtectata is a moth in the family Geometridae. It is found in Colombia.
