= Eois pallidula =

Scientific classification
- Kingdom: Animalia
- Phylum: Arthropoda
- Clade: Pancrustacea
- Class: Insecta
- Order: Lepidoptera
- Family: Geometridae
- Genus: Eois
- Species: E. pallidula

Binomial name
- Eois pallidula (Warren, 1896)

Synonyms
- Hydrelia pallidula Warren, 1896

Species of moth

Eois pallidula is a moth in the family Geometridae. It is found on Java, Bali, Borneo and Peninsular Malaysia. The habitat consists of lowland areas.

The ground colour of the wings is bone-white with a fine dull yellow fasciation.
