= Eois cellulata =

Scientific classification
- Kingdom: Animalia
- Phylum: Arthropoda
- Clade: Pancrustacea
- Class: Insecta
- Order: Lepidoptera
- Family: Geometridae
- Genus: Eois
- Species: E. cellulata

Binomial name
- Eois cellulata (Prout, 1910)

Synonyms
- Amaurinia cellulata Prout, 1910

Species of moth

Eois cellulata is a moth in the family Geometridae. It is found in central Peru.
