= Eois plicata =

Scientific classification
- Kingdom: Animalia
- Phylum: Arthropoda
- Clade: Pancrustacea
- Class: Insecta
- Order: Lepidoptera
- Family: Geometridae
- Genus: Eois
- Species: E. plicata

Binomial name
- Eois plicata (Moore, 1888)

Synonyms
- Bardanes plicata Moore, 1888

Species of moth

Eois plicata is a moth in the family Geometridae. It is found in India.
