= Eois neutraria =

Scientific classification
- Kingdom: Animalia
- Phylum: Arthropoda
- Clade: Pancrustacea
- Class: Insecta
- Order: Lepidoptera
- Family: Geometridae
- Genus: Eois
- Species: E. neutraria

Binomial name
- Eois neutraria (Guenee, 1858)

Synonyms
- Amaurinia neutraria Guenee, 1858

Species of moth

Eois neutraria is a moth in the family Geometridae. It is found in Brazil.
