= Eois quadrilatera =

Scientific classification
- Kingdom: Animalia
- Phylum: Arthropoda
- Clade: Pancrustacea
- Class: Insecta
- Order: Lepidoptera
- Family: Geometridae
- Genus: Eois
- Species: E. quadrilatera

Binomial name
- Eois quadrilatera (Dognin, 1895)

Synonyms
- Asthena quadrilatera Dognin, 1895

Species of moth

Eois quadrilatera is a moth in the family Geometridae first described by Paul Dognin in 1895. It is found in Ecuador.
