= Eois semirosea =

Scientific classification
- Kingdom: Animalia
- Phylum: Arthropoda
- Clade: Pancrustacea
- Class: Insecta
- Order: Lepidoptera
- Family: Geometridae
- Genus: Eois
- Species: E. semirosea

Binomial name
- Eois semirosea (Dognin, 1913)

Synonyms
- Amaurinia semirosea Dognin, 1913

Species of moth

Eois semirosea is a moth in the family Geometridae. It is found in Colombia.
