= Eois heliadaria =

Scientific classification
- Kingdom: Animalia
- Phylum: Arthropoda
- Clade: Pancrustacea
- Class: Insecta
- Order: Lepidoptera
- Family: Geometridae
- Genus: Eois
- Species: E. heliadaria

Binomial name
- Eois heliadaria (Guenee, 1857)

Synonyms
- Cambogia heliadaria Guenee, 1857

Species of moth

Eois heliadaria is a moth in the family Geometridae. It is found in Guiana and Honduras.
