= Eois nigriceps =

Scientific classification
- Kingdom: Animalia
- Phylum: Arthropoda
- Clade: Pancrustacea
- Class: Insecta
- Order: Lepidoptera
- Family: Geometridae
- Genus: Eois
- Species: E. nigriceps

Binomial name
- Eois nigriceps (Warren, 1907)

Synonyms
- Cambogia nigriceps Warren, 1907

Species of moth

Eois nigriceps is a moth in the family Geometridae. It is found in Peru.

The wingspan is about 30 mm. The forewings are wood-brown with dark grey lines, all swollen laterally on the costa into blackish coalescent blotches, so that the costal area appears dark. The hindwings are pale fawn, speckled with dark grey.
