= Eois serrilineata =

Scientific classification
- Kingdom: Animalia
- Phylum: Arthropoda
- Clade: Pancrustacea
- Class: Insecta
- Order: Lepidoptera
- Family: Geometridae
- Genus: Eois
- Species: E. serrilineata

Binomial name
- Eois serrilineata (Prout, 1910)

Synonyms
- Amaurinia serrilineata Prout, 1910

Species of moth

Eois serrilineata is a moth in the family Geometridae. It is found in Peru.
