= Eois sundasimilis =

Scientific classification
- Kingdom: Animalia
- Phylum: Arthropoda
- Clade: Pancrustacea
- Class: Insecta
- Order: Lepidoptera
- Family: Geometridae
- Genus: Eois
- Species: E. sundasimilis

Binomial name
- Eois sundasimilis Holloway, 1997

Species of moth

Eois sundasimilis is a moth in the family Geometridae. It is found on Borneo and possibly Peninsular Malaysia. The habitat consists of lowland dipterocarp forests.

The length of the forewings is 10 mm for males and 9 mm for females.
