= Eois mictographa =

Scientific classification
- Kingdom: Animalia
- Phylum: Arthropoda
- Clade: Pancrustacea
- Class: Insecta
- Order: Lepidoptera
- Family: Geometridae
- Genus: Eois
- Species: E. mictographa

Binomial name
- Eois mictographa Prout, 1933

Species of moth

Eois mictographa is a moth in the family Geometridae. It is found in Brazil.
