= Eois parva =

Scientific classification
- Kingdom: Animalia
- Phylum: Arthropoda
- Clade: Pancrustacea
- Class: Insecta
- Order: Lepidoptera
- Family: Geometridae
- Genus: Eois
- Species: E. parva

Binomial name
- Eois parva (Dognin, 1918)

Synonyms
- Cambogia parva Dognin, 1918

Species of moth

Eois parva is a moth in the family Geometridae. It is found in Colombia and Costa Rica.
