= Eois trinotata =

Scientific classification
- Kingdom: Animalia
- Phylum: Arthropoda
- Clade: Pancrustacea
- Class: Insecta
- Order: Lepidoptera
- Family: Geometridae
- Genus: Eois
- Species: E. trinotata

Binomial name
- Eois trinotata (Warren, 1895)

Synonyms
- Cambogia trinotata Warren, 1895

Species of moth

Eois trinotata is a moth in the family Geometridae. It is found on Jamaica.
