= Eois sanguilineata =

Scientific classification
- Kingdom: Animalia
- Phylum: Arthropoda
- Clade: Pancrustacea
- Class: Insecta
- Order: Lepidoptera
- Family: Geometridae
- Genus: Eois
- Species: E. sanguilineata

Binomial name
- Eois sanguilineata (Warren, 1901)

Synonyms
- Cretheis sanguilineata Warren, 1901

Species of moth

Eois sanguilineata is a moth in the family Geometridae. It is found on Misool in Indonesia.
