= Eois nigricosta =

Scientific classification
- Kingdom: Animalia
- Phylum: Arthropoda
- Clade: Pancrustacea
- Class: Insecta
- Order: Lepidoptera
- Family: Geometridae
- Genus: Eois
- Species: E. nigricosta

Binomial name
- Eois nigricosta Prout, 1926

Species of moth

Eois nigricosta is a moth in the family Geometridae. It is found in Peru.
