= Eois diversicosta =

Scientific classification
- Kingdom: Animalia
- Phylum: Arthropoda
- Clade: Pancrustacea
- Class: Insecta
- Order: Lepidoptera
- Family: Geometridae
- Genus: Eois
- Species: E. diversicosta

Binomial name
- Eois diversicosta (Prout, 1911)

Synonyms
- Cambogia diversicosta Prout, 1911

Species of moth

Eois diversicosta is a moth in the family Geometridae. It is found in western Colombia.
