= Eois lunatissima =

Scientific classification
- Kingdom: Animalia
- Phylum: Arthropoda
- Clade: Pancrustacea
- Class: Insecta
- Order: Lepidoptera
- Family: Geometridae
- Genus: Eois
- Species: E. lunatissima

Binomial name
- Eois lunatissima (Schaus, 1915)

Synonyms
- Cambogia lunatissima Schaus, 1915; Cambogia multilunata Schaus, 1912 (preocc.)

Species of moth

Eois lunatissima is a moth in the family Geometridae. It is found in Costa Rica.
