= Eois intacta =

Scientific classification
- Kingdom: Animalia
- Phylum: Arthropoda
- Clade: Pancrustacea
- Class: Insecta
- Order: Lepidoptera
- Family: Geometridae
- Genus: Eois
- Species: E. intacta

Binomial name
- Eois intacta (Warren, 1904)

Synonyms
- Cambogia intacta Warren, 1904

Species of moth

Eois intacta is a moth in the family Geometridae. It is found in Ecuador.
