= Eois cogitata =

Scientific classification
- Kingdom: Animalia
- Phylum: Arthropoda
- Clade: Pancrustacea
- Class: Insecta
- Order: Lepidoptera
- Family: Geometridae
- Genus: Eois
- Species: E. cogitata

Binomial name
- Eois cogitata (Dognin, 1918)

Synonyms
- Cambogia cogitata Dognin, 1918

Species of moth

Eois cogitata is a moth in the family Geometridae. It is found in Colombia.
