= Eois lucivittata =

Scientific classification
- Kingdom: Animalia
- Phylum: Arthropoda
- Clade: Pancrustacea
- Class: Insecta
- Order: Lepidoptera
- Family: Geometridae
- Genus: Eois
- Species: E. lucivittata

Binomial name
- Eois lucivittata (Warren, 1907)

Synonyms
- Cambogia lucivittata Warren, 1907

Species of moth

Eois lucivittata is a moth in the family Geometridae. It is found in Peru and Colombia.

== Subspecies ==
- Eois lucivittata lucivittata (south-eastern Peru)
- Eois lucivittata expurgata Prout, 1922 (Colombia)
