= Eois contraversa =

Scientific classification
- Kingdom: Animalia
- Phylum: Arthropoda
- Clade: Pancrustacea
- Class: Insecta
- Order: Lepidoptera
- Family: Geometridae
- Genus: Eois
- Species: E. contraversa

Binomial name
- Eois contraversa (Warren, 1907)

Synonyms
- Cambogia contraversa Warren, 1907

Species of moth

Eois contraversa is a moth in the family Geometridae. It is found in Peru.
