= Eois gemellaria =

Scientific classification
- Kingdom: Animalia
- Phylum: Arthropoda
- Clade: Pancrustacea
- Class: Insecta
- Order: Lepidoptera
- Family: Geometridae
- Genus: Eois
- Species: E. gemellaria

Binomial name
- Eois gemellaria (Guenee, 1858)

Synonyms
- Cambogia gemellaria Guenee, 1858; Cambogia multiplicata Walker, 1861; Cambogia pyraliata Warren, 1895

Species of moth

Eois gemellaria is a moth in the family Geometridae. It is found in French Guiana and Brazil.
