= Eois marcearia =

Scientific classification
- Kingdom: Animalia
- Phylum: Arthropoda
- Clade: Pancrustacea
- Class: Insecta
- Order: Lepidoptera
- Family: Geometridae
- Genus: Eois
- Species: E. marcearia

Binomial name
- Eois marcearia (Guenee, 1858)

Synonyms
- Cambogia marcearia Guenee, 1858; Achlora simplicearia Walker, 1861; Amaurinia expallidata Warren, 1904; Acidalia indignaria Walker, 1863

Species of moth

Eois marcearia is a moth in the family Geometridae. It is found in the Amazon region, including Brazil, as well as in Trinidad.
