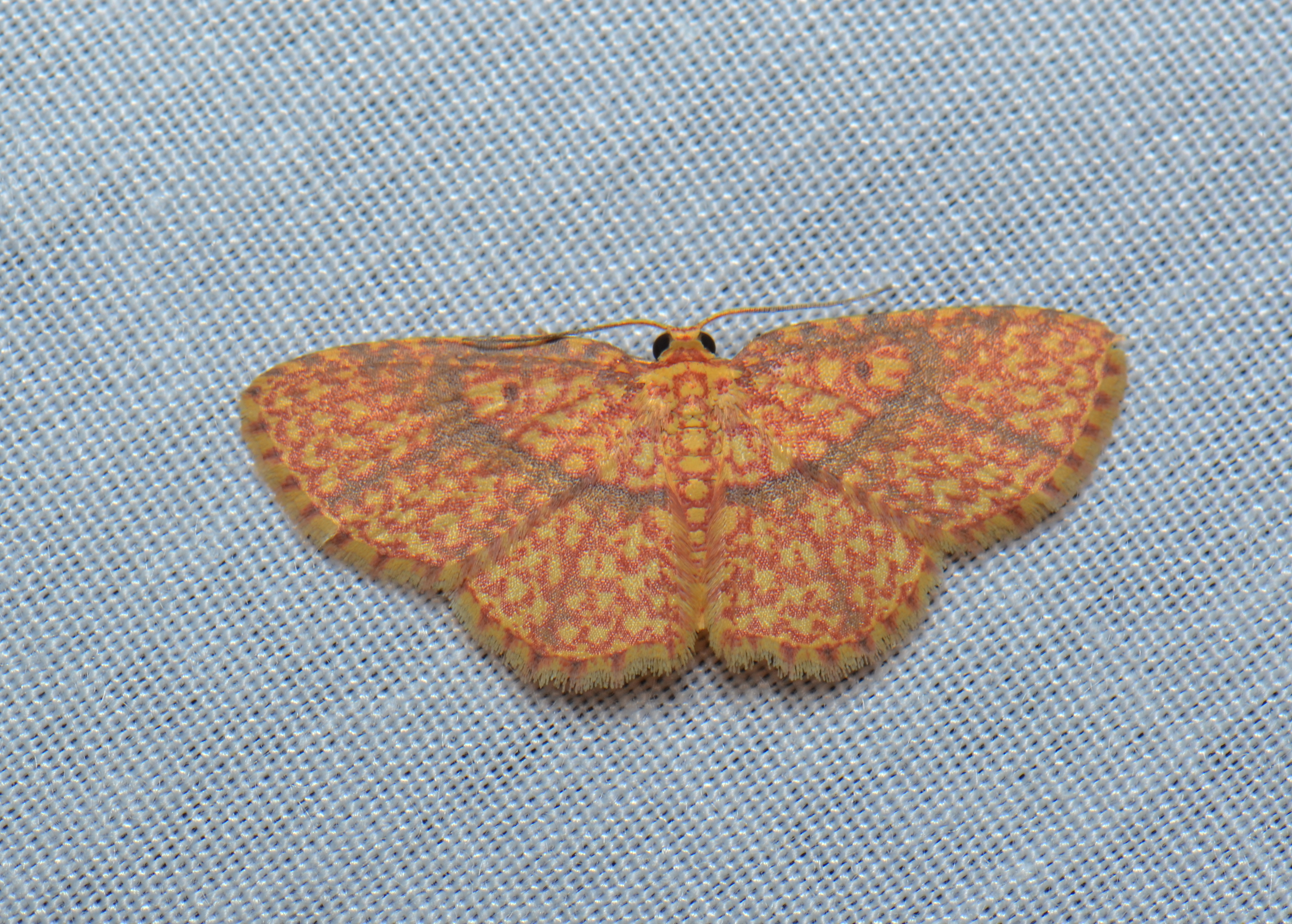

Scientific classification
- Kingdom: Animalia
- Phylum: Arthropoda
- Clade: Pancrustacea
- Class: Insecta
- Order: Lepidoptera
- Family: Geometridae
- Genus: Eois
- Species: E. phaneroscia

Binomial name
- Eois phaneroscia Prout, 1922

= Eois phaneroscia =

Species of moth

Eois phaneroscia is a moth in the family Geometridae. It is found in the north-eastern Himalayas and Sundaland. The habitat consists of lowland alluvial forests, hill dipterocarp forests, lower montane forests and scrubby montane forests.
