= Eois planifimbria =

Scientific classification
- Kingdom: Animalia
- Phylum: Arthropoda
- Clade: Pancrustacea
- Class: Insecta
- Order: Lepidoptera
- Family: Geometridae
- Genus: Eois
- Species: E. planifimbria

Binomial name
- Eois planifimbria Prout, 1922

Species of moth

Eois planifimbria is a moth in the family Geometridae. It is found on the Solomon Islands.
