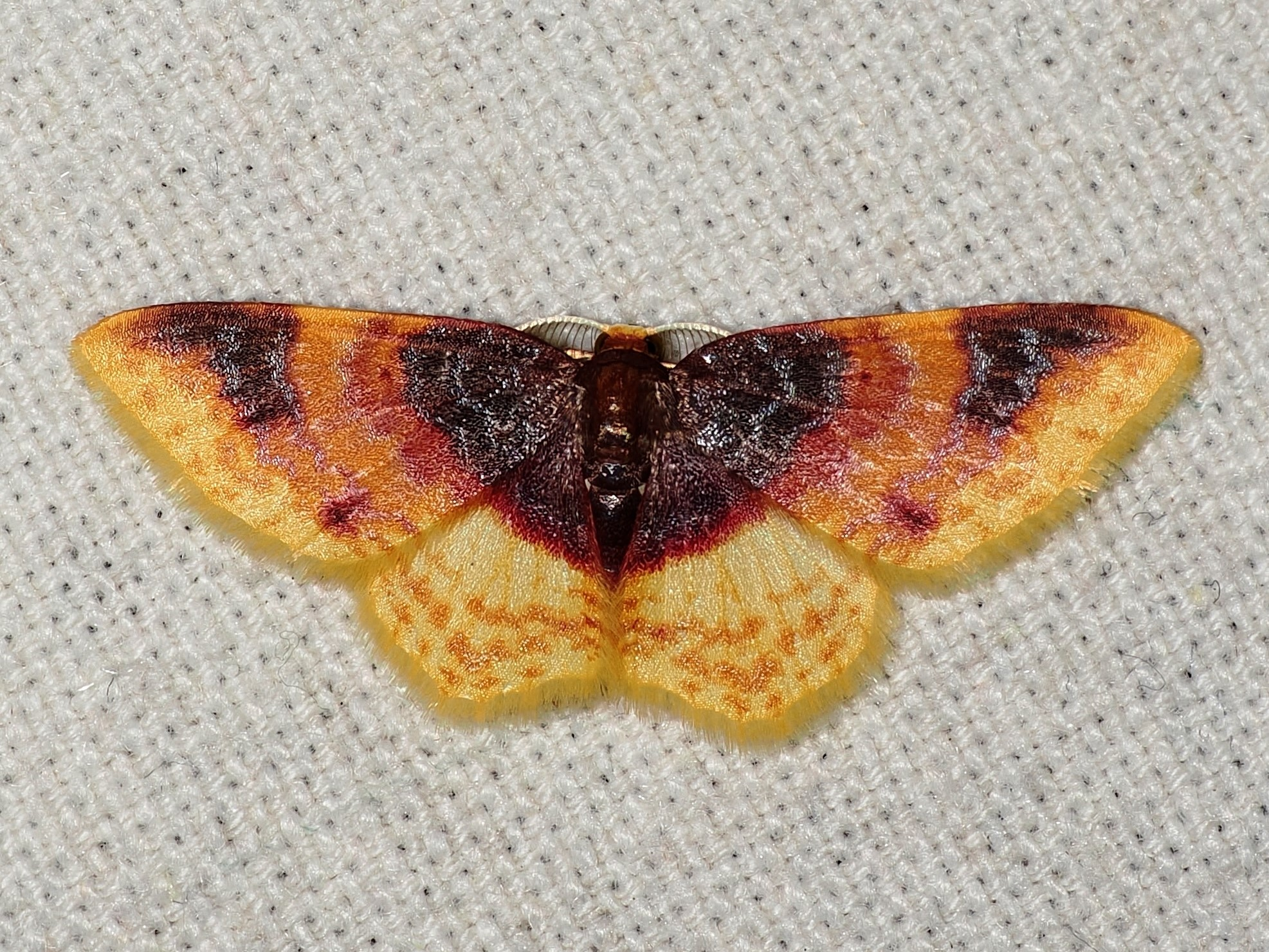

Scientific classification
- Kingdom: Animalia
- Phylum: Arthropoda
- Clade: Pancrustacea
- Class: Insecta
- Order: Lepidoptera
- Family: Geometridae
- Genus: Eois
- Species: E. inflammata

Binomial name
- Eois inflammata (Dognin, 1911)

Synonyms
- Cambogia inflammata Dognin, 1911

= Eois inflammata =

Species of moth

Eois inflammata is a species of moth in the family Geometridae. It is found in Colombia.
