= Eois multistrigaria =

Scientific classification
- Kingdom: Animalia
- Phylum: Arthropoda
- Clade: Pancrustacea
- Class: Insecta
- Order: Lepidoptera
- Family: Geometridae
- Genus: Eois
- Species: E. multistrigaria

Binomial name
- Eois multistrigaria Warren, 1901

Species of moth

Eois multistrigaria is a moth in the family Geometridae. It is found in Panama and Costa Rica.
