= Eois myrrha =

Scientific classification
- Kingdom: Animalia
- Phylum: Arthropoda
- Clade: Pancrustacea
- Class: Insecta
- Order: Lepidoptera
- Family: Geometridae
- Genus: Eois
- Species: E. myrrha

Binomial name
- Eois myrrha (Schaus, 1912)

Synonyms
- Cambogia myrrha Schaus, 1912

Species of moth

Eois myrrha is a moth in the family Geometridae. It is found in Costa Rica.
