= Eois escamata =

Scientific classification
- Kingdom: Animalia
- Phylum: Arthropoda
- Clade: Pancrustacea
- Class: Insecta
- Order: Lepidoptera
- Family: Geometridae
- Genus: Eois
- Species: E. escamata

Binomial name
- Eois escamata (Dognin, 1893)

Synonyms
- Cambogia escamata Dognin, 1893

Species of moth

Eois escamata is a moth in the family Geometridae. It is found in Ecuador.
