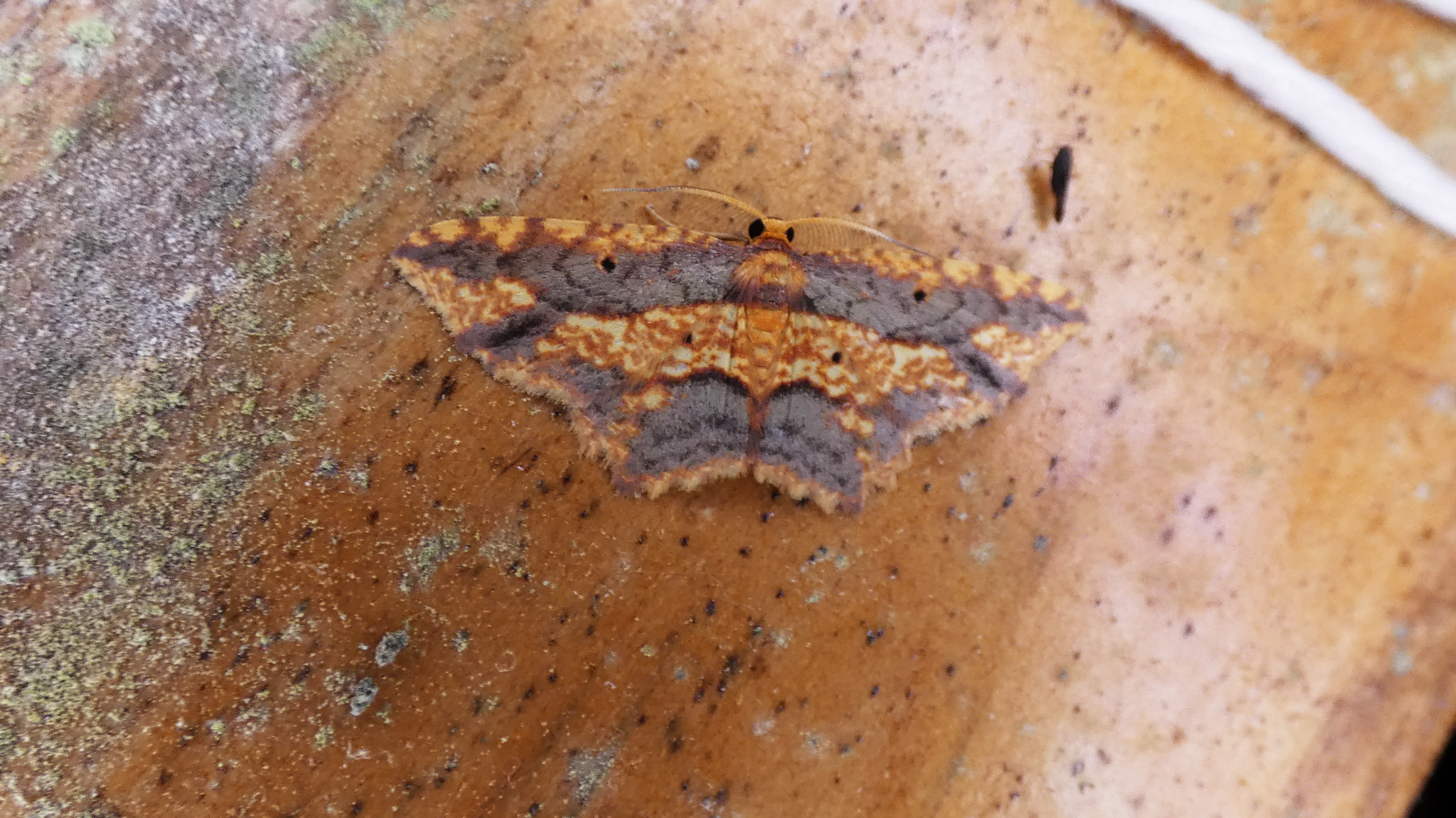

Scientific classification
- Kingdom: Animalia
- Phylum: Arthropoda
- Clade: Pancrustacea
- Class: Insecta
- Order: Lepidoptera
- Family: Geometridae
- Genus: Eois
- Species: E. plumbeofusa

Binomial name
- Eois plumbeofusa (Warren, 1901)

Synonyms
- Cambogia plumbeofusa Warren, 1901

= Eois plumbeofusa =

Species of moth

Eois plumbeofusa is a species of moth in the family Geometridae. It is found in Panama and Costa Rica.
