= Eois azafranata =

Scientific classification
- Kingdom: Animalia
- Phylum: Arthropoda
- Clade: Pancrustacea
- Class: Insecta
- Order: Lepidoptera
- Family: Geometridae
- Genus: Eois
- Species: E. azafranata

Binomial name
- Eois azafranata (Dognin, 1893)

Synonyms
- Cambogia azafranata Dognin, 1893; Cambogia anguinata Warren, 1904; Cambogia denlerata Schaus, 1901

Species of moth

Eois azafranata is a moth in the family Geometridae. It is found in Ecuador and Bolivia.
