= Eois vinosata =

Scientific classification
- Kingdom: Animalia
- Phylum: Arthropoda
- Clade: Pancrustacea
- Class: Insecta
- Order: Lepidoptera
- Family: Geometridae
- Genus: Eois
- Species: E. vinosata

Binomial name
- Eois vinosata (Warren, 1907)

Synonyms
- Cambogia vinosata Warren, 1907

Species of moth

Eois vinosata is a moth in the family Geometridae. It is found in Peru and Ecuador.

The wingspan is about 22 mm. The forewings are bright yellow, the basal area crossed by four or five sinuous vinous lines, the outermost containing a large vinous black cell-spot. The hindwings have a yellow base, a spot on the inner margin and a vinous cell-spot.
