= Eois brunneicosta =

Scientific classification
- Kingdom: Animalia
- Phylum: Arthropoda
- Clade: Pancrustacea
- Class: Insecta
- Order: Lepidoptera
- Family: Geometridae
- Genus: Eois
- Species: E. brunneicosta

Binomial name
- Eois brunneicosta (Dognin, 1916)

Synonyms
- Cambogia brunneicosta Dognin, 1916

Species of moth

Eois brunneicosta is a moth in the family Geometridae. It is found in Panama.
