= Eois roseocincta =

Scientific classification
- Kingdom: Animalia
- Phylum: Arthropoda
- Clade: Pancrustacea
- Class: Insecta
- Order: Lepidoptera
- Family: Geometridae
- Genus: Eois
- Species: E. roseocincta

Binomial name
- Eois roseocincta (Warren, 1908)

Synonyms
- Cambogia roseocincta Warren, 1908

Species of moth

Eois roseocincta is a moth in the family Geometridae. It is found in Guyana.

The wingspan is about 17 mm. The forewings are pale yellow, slightly deeper yellow along the costa and hind margin. There are many oblique rosy streaks on the costa. The hindwings have a rosy submarginal band, a faint cell spot and a rosy outer line.
