= Eois reticulata =

Scientific classification
- Kingdom: Animalia
- Phylum: Arthropoda
- Clade: Pancrustacea
- Class: Insecta
- Order: Lepidoptera
- Family: Geometridae
- Genus: Eois
- Species: E. reticulata

Binomial name
- Eois reticulata (Schaus, 1901)

Synonyms
- Cambogia reticulata Schaus, 1901

Species of moth

Eois reticulata is a moth in the family Geometridae. It is found in Bolivia.
