= Eois naias =

Scientific classification
- Kingdom: Animalia
- Phylum: Arthropoda
- Clade: Pancrustacea
- Class: Insecta
- Order: Lepidoptera
- Family: Geometridae
- Genus: Eois
- Species: E. naias

Binomial name
- Eois naias (Schaus, 1912)

Synonyms
- Cambogia naias Schaus, 1912

Species of moth

Eois naias is a moth in the family Geometridae. It is found in Costa Rica.
