= Eois plana =

Scientific classification
- Kingdom: Animalia
- Phylum: Arthropoda
- Clade: Pancrustacea
- Class: Insecta
- Order: Lepidoptera
- Family: Geometridae
- Genus: Eois
- Species: E. plana

Binomial name
- Eois plana (Dognin, 1918)

Synonyms
- Amaurinia plana Dognin, 1918

Species of moth

Eois plana is a moth in the family Geometridae. It is found in Panama.
