= Eois impletaria =

Scientific classification
- Kingdom: Animalia
- Phylum: Arthropoda
- Clade: Pancrustacea
- Class: Insecta
- Order: Lepidoptera
- Family: Geometridae
- Genus: Eois
- Species: E. impletaria

Binomial name
- Eois impletaria (Walker, 1866)

Synonyms
- Acidalia impletaria Walker, 1866; Hydrelia subrosea Warren, 1897

Species of moth

Eois impletaria is a moth in the family Geometridae. It is found on Mysol and Bali.
