= Eois nundina =

Scientific classification
- Kingdom: Animalia
- Phylum: Arthropoda
- Clade: Pancrustacea
- Class: Insecta
- Order: Lepidoptera
- Family: Geometridae
- Genus: Eois
- Species: E. nundina

Binomial name
- Eois nundina H. Druce, 1892

Species of moth

Eois nundina is a moth in the family Geometridae first described by Herbert Druce in 1892. It is found in Mexico.
