= Eois primularis =

Scientific classification
- Kingdom: Animalia
- Phylum: Arthropoda
- Clade: Pancrustacea
- Class: Insecta
- Order: Lepidoptera
- Family: Geometridae
- Genus: Eois
- Species: E. primularis

Binomial name
- Eois primularis Prout, 1922

Species of moth

Eois primularis is a moth in the family Geometridae. It is found in Peru.
