= Eois polycyma =

Scientific classification
- Kingdom: Animalia
- Phylum: Arthropoda
- Clade: Pancrustacea
- Class: Insecta
- Order: Lepidoptera
- Family: Geometridae
- Genus: Eois
- Species: E. polycyma

Binomial name
- Eois polycyma (West, 1930)

Synonyms
- Chrysocraspeda polycyma West, 1930

Species of moth

Eois polycyma is a moth in the family Geometridae. It is found on the Philippines.
