= Eois trillista =

Scientific classification
- Kingdom: Animalia
- Phylum: Arthropoda
- Clade: Pancrustacea
- Class: Insecta
- Order: Lepidoptera
- Family: Geometridae
- Genus: Eois
- Species: E. trillista

Binomial name
- Eois trillista (Warren, 1905)

Synonyms
- Cambogia trillista Warren, 1905

Species of moth

Eois trillista is a moth in the family Geometridae. It is found in Peru.
