= Eois mediogrisea =

Scientific classification
- Kingdom: Animalia
- Phylum: Arthropoda
- Clade: Pancrustacea
- Class: Insecta
- Order: Lepidoptera
- Family: Geometridae
- Genus: Eois
- Species: E. mediogrisea

Binomial name
- Eois mediogrisea (Dognin, 1914)

Synonyms
- Cambogia mediogrisea Dognin, 1914

Species of moth

Eois mediogrisea is a moth in the family Geometridae. It is found in Panama and Costa Rica.
