= Eois flavata =

Scientific classification
- Kingdom: Animalia
- Phylum: Arthropoda
- Clade: Pancrustacea
- Class: Insecta
- Order: Lepidoptera
- Family: Geometridae
- Genus: Eois
- Species: E. flavata

Binomial name
- Eois flavata (Warren, 1896)

Synonyms
- Bardanes flavata Warren, 1896

Species of moth

Eois flavata is a moth in the family Geometridae. It is found on Java.
