= Eois chasca =

Scientific classification
- Kingdom: Animalia
- Phylum: Arthropoda
- Clade: Pancrustacea
- Class: Insecta
- Order: Lepidoptera
- Family: Geometridae
- Genus: Eois
- Species: E. chasca

Binomial name
- Eois chasca (Dognin, 1899)

Synonyms
- Cambogia chasca Dognin, 1899

Species of moth

Eois chasca is a moth in the family Geometridae. It is found in Ecuador and Colombia.

== Subspecies ==
- Eois chasca chasca (Ecuador)
- Eois chasca oculata (Dognin, 1919) (Colombia)
