= Eois fulva =

Scientific classification
- Kingdom: Animalia
- Phylum: Arthropoda
- Clade: Pancrustacea
- Class: Insecta
- Order: Lepidoptera
- Family: Geometridae
- Genus: Eois
- Species: E. fulva

Binomial name
- Eois fulva (Prout, 1910)

Synonyms
- Amaurinia fulva Prout, 1910

Species of moth

Eois fulva is a moth in the family Geometridae. It was described from San Antonio.
