= Eois pyrauges =

Scientific classification
- Kingdom: Animalia
- Phylum: Arthropoda
- Clade: Pancrustacea
- Class: Insecta
- Order: Lepidoptera
- Family: Geometridae
- Genus: Eois
- Species: E. pyrauges

Binomial name
- Eois pyrauges Prout, 1927

Species of moth

Eois pyrauges is a moth in the family Geometridae. It is found on São Tomé.
