= Eois ingrataria =

Scientific classification
- Kingdom: Animalia
- Phylum: Arthropoda
- Clade: Pancrustacea
- Class: Insecta
- Order: Lepidoptera
- Family: Geometridae
- Genus: Eois
- Species: E. ingrataria

Binomial name
- Eois ingrataria (Warren, 1898)

Synonyms
- Psilocambogia ingrataria Warren, 1898; Eois tambora Prout, 1923

Species of moth

Eois ingrataria is a moth in the family Geometridae. It is found in India and on Sumbawa.
