= Eois perfusca =

Scientific classification
- Kingdom: Animalia
- Phylum: Arthropoda
- Clade: Pancrustacea
- Class: Insecta
- Order: Lepidoptera
- Family: Geometridae
- Genus: Eois
- Species: E. perfusca

Binomial name
- Eois perfusca Herbulot, 1988

Species of moth

Eois perfusca is a moth in the family Geometridae. It is found in Cameroon.
