= Eois mediostrigata =

Scientific classification
- Kingdom: Animalia
- Phylum: Arthropoda
- Clade: Pancrustacea
- Class: Insecta
- Order: Lepidoptera
- Family: Geometridae
- Genus: Eois
- Species: E. mediostrigata

Binomial name
- Eois mediostrigata (Warren, 1907)

Synonyms
- Cambogia mediostrigata Warren, 1907

Species of moth

Eois mediostrigata is a moth in the family Geometridae. It is found in Peru and Ecuador.

The wingspan is about 22 mm. The forewings are grey, freckled with reddish brown. The lines are thick, reddish brown. There are four lines on the hindwings. All are parallel and bluntly angled outwards, the first on the median vein, the other three between veins three and four.
