= Eois coerulea =

Scientific classification
- Kingdom: Animalia
- Phylum: Arthropoda
- Clade: Pancrustacea
- Class: Insecta
- Order: Lepidoptera
- Family: Geometridae
- Genus: Eois
- Species: E. coerulea

Binomial name
- Eois coerulea (Warren, 1905)

Synonyms
- Amaurinia coerulea Warren, 1905

Species of moth

Eois coerulea is a moth in the family Geometridae. It is found in Argentina.
