= Eois dissimilaris =

Scientific classification
- Kingdom: Animalia
- Phylum: Arthropoda
- Class: Insecta
- Order: Lepidoptera
- Family: Geometridae
- Genus: Eois
- Species: E. dissimilaris

Binomial name
- Eois dissimilaris Moore, 1887

Species of insect

Eois dissimilaris is a species of moth in the Geometridae family.
