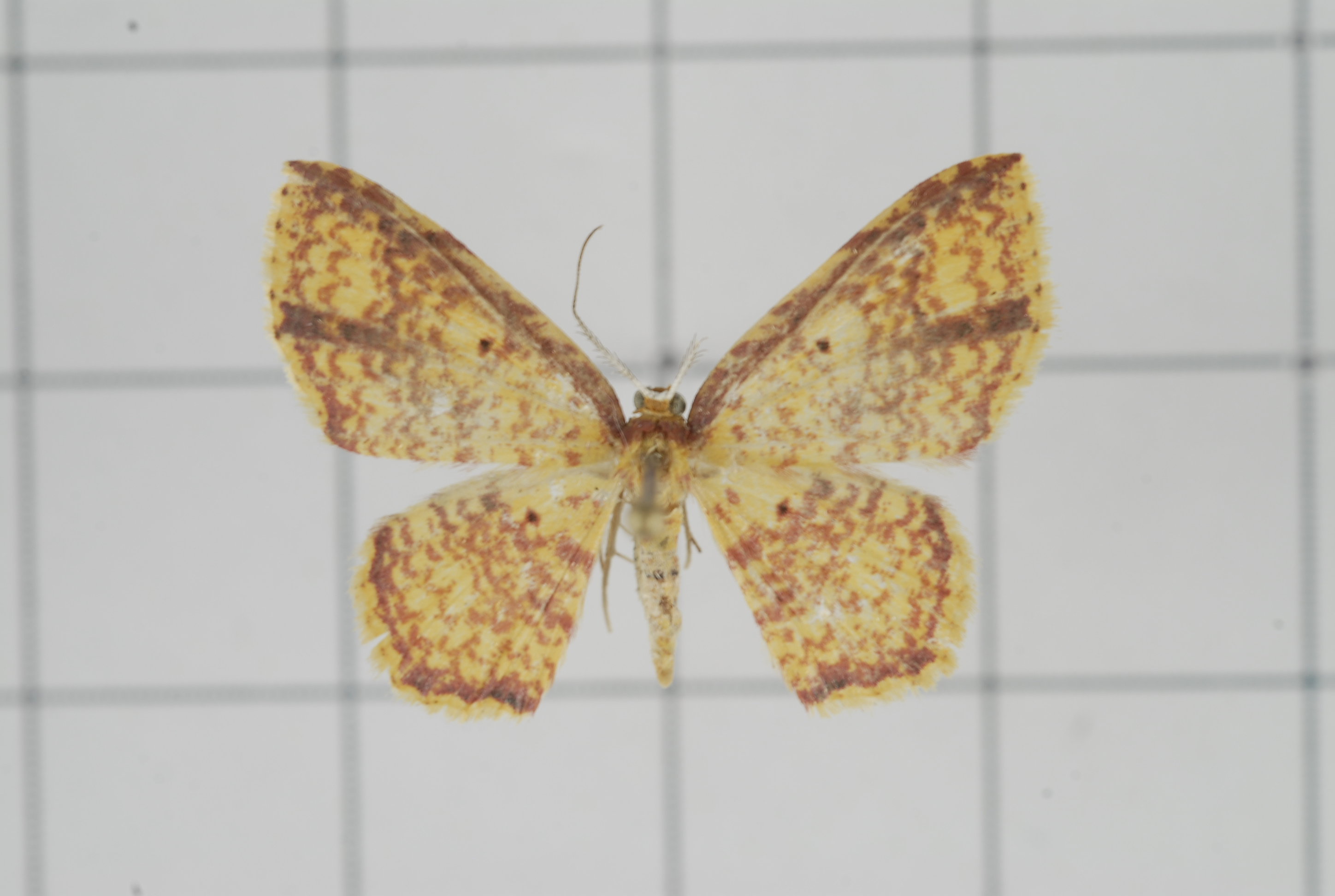

Scientific classification
- Kingdom: Animalia
- Phylum: Arthropoda
- Clade: Pancrustacea
- Class: Insecta
- Order: Lepidoptera
- Family: Geometridae
- Genus: Eois
- Species: E. lunulosa

Binomial name
- Eois lunulosa (Moore, 1887)

Synonyms
- Pseudasthena lunulosa Moore, 1887; Pseudasthena ochracea Warren, 1894; Chrysocraspeda duplicilinea Wileman, 1911

= Eois lunulosa =

Species of moth

Eois lunulosa is a moth in the family Geometridae. It is found in Sri Lanka and Taiwan.

== Description ==
Its wingspan is about 22–26 mm. The antennae in both sexes is bipectinate (comblike on both sides) with long branches to two-thirds of their length. It has hindwings with rounded outer margins. Veins 3 and 4 are stalked. Vertex of the head as well as the frons are chestnut colored. The shaft of the antennae are whitish. Collar is crimson coloured. Forewings with a sub-costal crimson fascia. Both wings with many of the waved lines obsolescent, and medial and postmedial lines more developed. An ill-defined marginal crimson band has a purplish-silvery patch at outer angle.

== Subspecies ==
- Eois lunulosa lunulosa nominate (Sri Lanka)
- Eois lunulosa duplicilinea (Wileman, 1911) (Taiwan)
