= Eois contractata =

Scientific classification
- Kingdom: Animalia
- Phylum: Arthropoda
- Clade: Pancrustacea
- Class: Insecta
- Order: Lepidoptera
- Family: Geometridae
- Genus: Eois
- Species: E. contractata

Binomial name
- Eois contractata (Walker, 1861)

Synonyms
- Cambogia contractata Walker, 1861; Psilocambogia hyriaria Warren, 1894

Species of moth

Eois contractata is a moth in the family Geometridae. It is found in Brazil.
