= Eois glauculata =

Scientific classification
- Kingdom: Animalia
- Phylum: Arthropoda
- Clade: Pancrustacea
- Class: Insecta
- Order: Lepidoptera
- Family: Geometridae
- Genus: Eois
- Species: E. glauculata

Binomial name
- Eois glauculata (Walker, 1863)

Synonyms
- Thalassodes glauculata Walker, 1863

Species of moth

Eois glauculata is a moth in the family Geometridae. It is found in Brazil.
