= Eois chione =

Scientific classification
- Kingdom: Animalia
- Phylum: Arthropoda
- Clade: Pancrustacea
- Class: Insecta
- Order: Lepidoptera
- Family: Geometridae
- Genus: Eois
- Species: E. chione

Binomial name
- Eois chione Prout, 1933

Species of moth

Eois chione is a moth in the family Geometridae. It is found in Brazil.
