= List of Lepidoptera of Honduras =

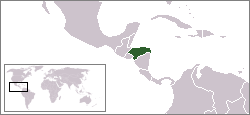
Location of Honduras

The Lepidoptera of Honduras consist of both the butterflies and moths recorded from Honduras.

According to a recent estimate, there are a total of 861 butterfly and 1,441 moth species present in Honduras.

Note: the abbreviation sp. nr. means "species near".

== Butterflies ==
=== Papilionoidea ===
==== Papilionidae ====
- Battus ingenuus (Dyar, 1907),
- Battus laodamas copanae (Reakirt, 1863)
- Battus lycidas (Cramer, 1777)
- Battus polydamas polydamas (Linnaeus, 1758)
- Eurytides agesilaus neosilaus (Höpffer, 1865)
- Eurytides calliste calliste (H. Bates, 1864)
- Eurytides dioxippus lancandones (H. Bates, 1864)
- Eurytides epidaus epidaus (Doubleday, 1846)
- Eurytides macrosilaus macrosilaus (Gray, [1853])
- Eurytides philolaus philolaus (Boisduval, 1836)
- Eurytides salvini (H. Bates, 1864)
- Eurytides thyastes marchandii (Boisduval, 1836)
- Heraclides anchisiades idaeus (Fabricius, 1793)
- Heraclides androgeus epidaurus (Godman & Salvin, 1890)
- Heraclides astyalus pallas (G. Gray, [1853])
- Heraclides cresphontes (Cramer, 1777)
- Heraclides ornythion (Boisduval, 1836)
- Heraclides paeon thrason (C. Felder & R. Felder, 1865)
- Heraclides thoas autocles (Rothschild & Jordan, 1906)
- Heraclides torquatus tolmides (Godman & Salvin, 1890)
- Mimoides ilus branchus (Doubleday, 1846)
- Mimoides phaon phaon (Boisduval, 1836)
- Mimoides thymbraeus thymbraeus (Boisduval, 1836)
- Papilio birchallii bryki Strand, 1930
- Papilio erostratus erostratus Westwood, 1847
- Papilio garamas electryon H. Bates, 1864
- Papilio polyxenes asterius (Stoll, 1782)
- Papilio victorinus victorinus E. Doubleday, 1844
- Papilio vulneratus vulneratus Butler, 1872
- Parides childrenae childrenae (Gray, 1832)
- Parides erathalion polyzelus (C. Felder & R. Felder, 1865)
- Parides eurimedes mylotes (H. Bates, 1861)
- Parides iphidamas iphidamas (Fabricius, 1793)
- Parides montezuma (Westwood, 1842)
- Parides panares lycimenes (Boisduval, 1870)
- Parides photinus (Doubleday, 1844)
- Parides sesostris zestos (Gray, [1853])

==== Hesperiidae ====
===== Eudaminae =====
- Achalarus albociliatus albociliatus (Mabille, 1877)
- Achalarus toxeus (Plötz, 1882)
- Aguna asander asander (Hewitson, 1867)
- Aguna aurunce hypozonius (Plötz, 1880)
- Aguna claxon Evans, 1952
- Aguna panama Austin & Mielke, 1998
- Astraptes alardus latia Evans, 1952
- Astraptes alector hopfferi (Plötz, 1881)
- Astraptes anaphus annetta Evans, 1952
- Astraptes brevicauda (Plötz, 1886)
- Astraptes chiriquensis chiriquensis (Staudinger, 1876)
- Astraptes egregius egregius (Butler, 1870)
- Astraptes enotrus (Stoll, 1781)
- Astraptes "fulgerator azul" (Reakirt, [1867])
- Astraptes janeira (Schaus, 1902)
- Astraptes phalaecus (Godman & Salvin, 1893)
- Astraptes talus (Cramer, 1777)
- Astraptes tucuti (R. Williams, 1927)
- Astraptes weymeri (Plötz, 1882)
- Autochton bipunctatus (Gmelin, 1790)
- Autochton longipennis (Plötz, 1882)
- Autochton neis (Geyer, 1832)
- Autochton vectilucis (Butler, 1872)
- Autochton zarex (Hübner, 1818)
- Bungalotis astylos (Cramer, 1780)
- Bungalotis erythus (Cramer, 1775)
- Bungalotis midas (Cramer, 1775)
- Bungalotis quadratum quadratum (Sepp, [1845])
- Cabares potrillo potrillo (Lucas, 1857)
- Cephise aelius (Plötz, 1880)
- Chioides albofasciatus (Hewitson, 1867)
- Chioides catillus albius Evans, 1952
- Chioides zilpa (Butler, 1872)
- Codatractus alcaeus alcaeus (Hewitson, 1867)
- Codatractus bryaxis (Hewitson, 1867)
- Codatractus carlos carlos Evans, 1952
- Codatractus cyda (Godman, 1901)
- Cogia caicus caicus (Herrich-Schäffer, 1869)
- Cogia cajeta cajeta (Herrich-Schäffer, 1869)
- Cogia calchas (Herrich-Schäffer, 1869)
- Drephalys alcmon (Cramer, 1779)
- Drephalys oria Evans, 1952
- Drephalys oriander (Hewitson, 1867)
- Dyscophellus diaphorus (Magille & Boullet, 1912)
- Dyscophellus phraxanor lama Evans, 1952
- Dyscophellus ramon Evans, 1952
- Entheus crux Steinhauser, 1989
- Epargyreus aspina Evans, 1952
- Epargyreus clavicornis gaumeri Godman & Salvin, 1893
- Epargyreus exadeus cruza Evans, 1952
- Epargyreus spina spina Evans, 1952
- Hyalothyrus neleus pemphigargyra (Mabille, 1888)
- Narcosius colossus colossus (Herrich-Schäffer, 1869)
- Narcosius nazaraeus Steinhauser, 1986
- Narcosius parisi helen (Evans, 1952)
- Nascus phocus (Cramer, 1777)
- Nascus solon corilla Evans, 1952
- Nicephellus nicephorus (Hewitson, 1876)
- Phanus marshallii (Kirby, 1880)
- Phanus obscurior obscurior Kaye, 1925
- Phanus vitreus (Stoll, 1781)
- Phocides distans licinus (Möschler, 1879)
- Phocides metrodorus nigrescens E. Bell, 1938
- Phocides pigmalion pigmalion (Cramer, 1779)
- Phocides polybius lilea (Reakirt, [1867])
- Phocides thermus thermus (Mabille, 1883)
- Polygonus savigny savigny (Latreille, [1824])
- Polythrix asine (Hewitson, 1867)
- Polythrix metallescens (Mabille, 1888)
- Polythrix octomaculata (Sepp, [1844])
- Porphyrogenes passalus (Herrich-Schäffer, 1869)
- Porphyrogenes sula (Williams & Bell, 1940)
- Porphyrogenes virgatus (Mabille, 1888)
- Porphyrogenes zohra (Möschler, 1879)
- Proteides mercurius mercurius (Fabricius, 1787)
- Pseudonascus paulliniae (Sepp, [1842])
- Ridens mephitis (Hewitson, 1876)
- Spathilepia clonius (Cramer, 1775)
- Tarsoctenus corytus gaudialis (Hewsitson, 1876)
- Telemiades avitus (Stoll, 1781)
- Telemiades fides Bell, 1949
- Telemiades megallus Mabille, 1888
- Telemiades oiclus (Mabille, 1889)
- Thessia jalapus (Plötz, 1881)
- Typhedanus ampyx (Godman & Salvin, 1893)
- Typhedanus undulatus (Hewitson, 1867)
- Udranomia kikkawai (Weeks, 1906)
- Urbanus albimargo albimargo (Mabille, 1875)
- Urbanus belli (Hayward, 1935)
- Urbanus dorantes dorantes (Stoll, 1790)
- Urbanus doryssus doryssus (Swainson, 1831)
- Urbanus esmeraldus (Butler, 1877)
- Urbanus procne (Plötz, 1881)
- Urbanus pronta Evans, 1952
- Urbanus proteus proteus (Linnaeus, 1758)
- Urbanus simplicius (Stoll, 1790)
- Urbanus tanna Evans, 1952
- Urbanus teleus (Hübner, 1821)
- Urbanus viterboana (Ehrmann, 1907)

===== Pyrginae =====
- Achlyodes busirus heros Ehrmann, 1909
- Achlyodes pallida (R. Felder, 1869)
- Aethilla echina echina Hewitson, 1870
- Aethilla lavochrea Butler, 1872
- Anastrus neaeris neaeris (Möschler, 1879)
- Anastrus petius peto Evans, 1953
- Anastrus sempiternus sempiternus (Butler & H. Druce, 1872)
- Anastrus tolimus tolimus (Plötz, 1884)
- Anisochoria bacchus Evans, 1953
- Antigonus corrosus Mabille, 1878
- Antigonus erosus (Hübner, [1812])
- Antigonus nearchus (Latreille, 1817)
- Arteurotia tractipennis tractipennis Butler & H. Druce, 1872
- Atarnes sallei (C. Felder & R. Felder, 1867)
- Bolla clytius (Godman & Salvin, 1897)
- Bolla cupreiceps (Mabille, 1891)
- Bolla cylindus (Godman & Salvin, 1896)
- Bolla imbras (Godman & Salvin, 1896)
- Camptopleura theramenes Mabille, 1877
- Carrhenes calidius Godman & Salvin, 1895
- Carrhenes canescens canescens (R. Felder, 1869)
- Carrhenes fuscescens fuscescens (Mabille, 1891)
- Celaenorrhinus cynapes cynapes (Hewitson, 1870)
- Celaenorrhinus fritzgaertneri (Bailey, 1880)
- Celaenorrhinus monartus (Plötz, 1884)
- Celaenorrhinus stola Evans, 1952
- Chalypyge chalybea chloris (Evans, 1951)
- Chiomara georgina georgina (Reakirt, 1868)
- Chiomara mithrax (Möschler, 1879)
- Cycloglypha thrasibulus thrasibulus (Fabricius, 1793)
- Cyclosemia anastomosis Mabille, 1878
- Cyclosemia pedro R. Williams & E. Bell, 1940
- Doberes anticus (Plötz, 1884)
- Eantis thraso (Hübner, [1807])
- Ebrietas anacreon anacreon (Staudinger, 1876)
- Ebrietas evanidus Mabille, 1898
- Elbella patrobas patrobas (Hewitson, 1857)
- Elbella scylla (Ménétriés, 1855)
- Erynnis funeralis (Scudder & Burgess, 1870)
- Erynnis tristis tatius (W. H. Edwards, 1883)
- Gesta invisus (Butler & H. Druce, 1872)
- Gorgopas chlorocephala chlorocephala (Herrich-Schäffer, 1870)
- Gorgythion begga pyralina (Möschler, 1877)
- Gorgythion vox Evans, 1953
- Helias cama Evans, 1953
- Heliopetes alana (Reakirt, 1868)
- Heliopetes arsalte (Linnaeus, 1758)
- Heliopetes laviana laviana (Hewitson, 1868)
- Heliopetes macaira macaira (Reakirt, [1867])
- Melanopyge erythrosticta (Godman & Salvin, 1879)
- Mylon jason (Ehrmann, 1907)
- Mylon lassia (Hewitson, 1868)
- Mylon maimon (Fabricius, 1775)
- Mylon pelopidas (Fabricius, 1793)
- Myscelus amystis hages Godman & Salvin, 1893
- Mysoria barcastus ambigua (Mabille & Boullet, 1908)
- Nisoniades castolus (Hewitson, 1878)
- Nisoniades ephora (Herrich-Schäffer, 1870)
- Nisoniades godma Evans, 1953
- Nisoniades macarius (Herrich-Schäffer, 1870)
- Nisoniades rubescens (Möschler, 1877)
- Noctuana lactifera bipuncta (Plötz, 1884)
- Noctuana stator (Godman & Salvin, 1899)
- Ouleus salvina Evans, 1953
- Paches loxus gloriosus Röber, 1925
- Pachyneuria licisca (Plötz, 1882)
- Passova gellias (Godman & Salvin, 1893)
- Pellicia arina Evans, 1953
- Pellicia dimidiata dimidiata Herrich-Schäffer, 1870
- Polyctor enops (Godman & Salvin, 1894)
- Pyrgus adepta Plötz, 1884
- Pyrgus oileus (Linnaeus, 1767)
- Pyrrhopyge zenodorus Godman & Salvin, 1893
- Pythonides grandis assecla Mabille, 1883
- Pythonides jovianus amaryllis Staudinger, 1876
- Pythonides proxenus (Godman & Salvin, 1895)
- Quadrus cerialis (Stoll, 1782)
- Quadrus contubernalis contubernalis (Mabille, 1883)
- Quadrus lugubris lugubris (R. Felder, 1869)
- Sostrata nordica Evans, 1953
- Staphylus ascalaphus (Staudinger, 1876)
- Staphylus azteca (Scudder, 1872)
- Staphylus vulgata (Möschler, 1879)
- Theagenes aegides (Herrich-Schäffer, 1869)
- Timochares trifasciata trifasciata (Hewitson, 1868)
- Tosta platypterus (Mabille, 1895)
- Xenophanes tryxus (Cramer, 1780)
- Yanguna cosyra (H. Druce, 1875)
- Zera hyacinthinus hyacinthinus (Mabille, 1877)
- Zera sp.
- Zopyrion sandace Godman & Salvin, 1896

===== Hesperiinae =====
- Aides brino (Stoll, 1781)
- Aides dysoni Godman, 1900
- Anatrytone mella (Godman, 1900)
- Anatrytone potosiensis (H. Freeman, 1969)
- Ancyloxypha arene (W. H. Edwards, 1871)
- Anthoptus epictetus (Fabricius, 1793)
- Anthoptus insignis (Plötz, 1882)
- Argon lota (Hewitson, 1877)
- Aroma aroma (Hewitson, 1867)
- Atalopedes campestris huron (W. H. Edwards, 1863)
- Callimormus juventus Scudder, 1872
- Callimormus radiola radiola (Mabille, 1878)
- Callimormus saturnus (Herrich-Schäffer, 1869)
- Calpodes ethlius (Stoll, 1782)
- Carystoides basoches (Latreille, [1824])
- Carystoides hondura Evans, 1955
- Carystoides lila Evans, 1955
- Carystus phorcus phorcus (Cramer, 1777)
- Cobalopsis nero (Herrich-Schäffer, 1869)
- Cobalus fidicula (Hewitson, 1877)
- Conga chydaea (Butler, 1877)
- Copaeodes minima (W. H. Edwards, 1870)
- Corticea corticea (Plötz, 1882)
- Corticea lysias lysias (Plötz, 1883)
- Cymaenes fraus (Godman, 1900)
- Cymaenes trebius (Mabille, 1891)
- Cymaenes tripunctus theogenis (Capronnier, 1874)
- Cynea cynea (Hewitson, 1876)
- Cynea diluta (Herrich-Schäffer, 1869)
- Cynea irma (Möschler, 1879)
- Damas clavus (Herrich-Schäffer, 1869)
- Decinea decinea derisor (Mabille, 1891)
- Dubiella fiscella belpa Evans, 1955
- Enosis immaculata immaculata (Hewitson, 1868)
- Eprius veleda veleda (Godman, 1900)
- Euphyes ampa Evans, 1955
- Euphyes peneia (Godman, 1900)
- Eutocus facilis (Plötz, 1884)
- Eutocus vetulus vetulus (Mabille, 1883)
- Eutychide asema (Mabille, 1891)
- Eutychide complana (Herrich-Schäffer, 1869)
- Eutychide paria (Plötz, 1882)
- Falga sciras Godman, 1901
- Hylephila phyleus phyleus (Drury, 1773)
- Justinia sp.
- Lerema accius (J. E. Smith, 1797)
- Lerema liris Evans, 1955
- Lychnuchoides saptine (Godman & Salvin, 1879)
- Methionopsis ina (Plötz, 1882)
- Methionopsis typhon Godman, 1901
- Metron zimra (Hewitson, 1877)
- Mnaseas bicolor (Mabille, 1889)
- Mnasicles geta Godman, 1901
- Mnasilus allubita (Butler, 1877)
- Mnasitheus cephoides Hayward, 1943
- Mnasitheus chrysophrys (Mabille, 1891)
- Monca crispinus (Plötz, 1882)
- Morys lyde (Godman, 1900)
- Morys micythus (Godman, 1900)
- Morys valda Evans, 1955
- Naevolus orius (Mabille, 1883)
- Nastra julia (H. Freeman, 1945)
- Nastra leucone leucone (Godman, 1900)
- Neoxeniades luda (Hewitson, 1877)
- Neoxeniades seron seron (Godman, 1901)
- Niconiades incomptus Austin, 1997
- Niconiades nikko Hayward, 1948
- Niconiades viridis vista Evans, 1955
- Nyctelius nyctelius nyctelius (Latreille, [1824])
- Orses cynisca (Swainson, 1821)
- Panoquina evadnes (Stoll, 1781)
- Panoquina fusina viola Evans, 1955
- Panoquina hecebolus (Scudder, 1872)
- Panoquina lucas (Fabricius, 1793)
- Panoquina ocola (W. H. Edwards, 1863)
- Panoquina pauper pauper (Mabille, 1878)
- Papias dictys Godman, 1900
- Papias subcostulata (Herrich-Schäffer, 1870)
- Paracarystus hypargyra (Herrich-Schäffer, 1869)
- Parphorus storax storax (Mabille, 1891)
- Perichares adela (Hewitson, 1867)
- Perichares aurina Evans, 1955
- Phanes aletes (Geyer, 1832)
- Poanes zabulon (Boisduval & Le Conte, [1837])
- Polites subreticulata (Plötz, 1883)
- Polites vibex praeceps (Scudder, 1872)
- Pompeius pompeius (Latreille, [1824])
- Quasimellana eulogius (Plötz, 1882)
- Quasimellana myron (Godman, 1900)
- Quinta cannae (Herrich-Schäffer, 1869)
- Remella remus (Fabricius, 1798)
- Remella vopiscus (Herrich-Schäffer, 1869)
- Rhinthon osca (Plötz, 1882)
- Saliana antoninus (Latreille, [1824])
- Saliana esperi esperi Evans, 1955
- Saliana longirostris (Sepp, [1840])
- Saliana saladin saladin Evans, 1955
- Saliana triangularis (Kaye, 1914)
- Synapte pecta Evans, 1955
- Synapte salenus salenus (Mabille, 1893)
- Talides cantra Evans, 1955
- Talides sergestus (Cramer, 1775)
- Thespieus dalman (Latreille, [1824]) PBL
- Thoon modius (Mabille, 1889)
- Thracides arcalaus (Stoll, 1782)
- Thracides phidon (Cramer, 1779)
- Tirynthia conflua (Herrich-Schäffer, 1869)
- Tromba xanthura (Godman, 1901)
- Vacerra litana (Hewitson, 1866)
- Vehilius inca (Scudder, 1872)
- Vehilius stictomenes illudens (Mabille, 1891)
- Vertica verticalis coatepeca (Schaus, 1902)
- Vettius aurelius (Plötz, 1882)
- Vettius fantasos (Cramer, 1780)
- Vettius lafrenaye pica (Herrich-Schäffer, 1869)
- Vettius onaca Evans, 1955
- Wallengrenia otho clavus (Erichson, [1849])
- Wallengrenia otho otho (J. E. Smith, 1797)
- Xeniades orchamus orchamus (Cramer, 1777)
- Zariaspes mys (Hübner, [1808])
- Zenis minos (Latreille, [1824])

==== Pieridae ====
===== Dismorphiinae =====
- Dismorpha crisia steinhauseri J. & R. G. de la Maza, 1984
- Dismorphia amphione praxinoe (Doubleday, 1844)
- Dismorphia theucharila fortunata (Lucas, 1854)
- Enantia albania albania (H. Bates, 1864)
- Enantia jethys (Boisduval, 1836)
- Enantia lina marion Godman & Salvin 1889
- Lieinix nemesis atthis (Doubleday, 1842)
- Pseudopieris nehemia francisca Lamas, 1979

===== Coliadinae =====
- Abaeis nicippe (Cramer, 1779)
- Anteos clorinde (Godart, [1824])
- Anteos maerula (Fabricius, 1775)
- Aphrissa boisduvalii (C. Felder & R. Felder, 1861)
- Aphrissa statira statira (Cramer, 1777)
- Eurema agave millerorum Llorente & Luis, 1987
- Eurema albula celata (R. Felder, 1869)
- Eurema boisduvaliana (C. Felder & R. Felder, 1865)
- Eurema daira eugenia (Wallengren, 1860)
- Eurema mexicana mexicana (Boisduval, 1836)
- Eurema salome jamapa (Reakirt, 1866)
- Eurema xanthochlora xanthochlora (Kollar, 1850)
- Nathalis iole iole Boisduval, 1836
- Phoebis agarithe agarithe (Boisduval, 1836)
- Phoebis argante (Fabricius, 1775)
- Phoebis neocypris virgo (Butler, 1870)
- Phoebis philea philea (Linnaeus, 1763)
- Phoebis sennae marcellina (Cramer, 1777)
- Pyrisitia dina westwoodi (Boisduval, 1836)
- Pyrisitia lisa centralis (Herrich Schäffer, 1865)
- Pyrisitia nise nelphe (R. Felder, 1869)
- Pyrisitia proterpia (Fabricius, 1775)
- Rhabdodryas trite trite (Linnaeus, 1758)
- Zerene cesonia cesonia (Stoll, 1790)

===== Pierinae =====
- Archonias brassolis approximata (Butler, 1873)
- Ascia monuste monuste (Linnaeus, 1764)
- Catasticta nimbice ochracea (H. Bates, 1864)
- Ganyra josephina josepha (Salvin & Godman, 1868)
- Glutophrissa drusilla tenuis (Lamas, 1981)
- Hesperocharis crocea crocea H. Bates, 1866
- Itaballia demophile centralis Joicey & Talbot, 1928
- Itaballia pandosia kicaha (Reakirt, 1863)
- Leptophobia aripa elodia (Boisduval, 1836)
- Melete lycimnia isandra (Boisduval, 1836)
- Pereute charops nigricans Joicey & Talbot, 1928
- Perrhybris pamela chajulensis J. & R. G. de la Maza, 1989
- Pieriballia viardi viardi (Boisduval, 1836)

==== Lycaenidae ====
===== Theclinae =====
- Arawacus dumenilii (Godart, [1824])
- Arawacus sito (Boisduval, 1836)
- Arawacus togarna (Hewitson, 1867)
- Arcas cypria (Geyer, 1837)
- Arcas imperialis (Cramer, 1775)
- Atlides carpasia (Hewitson, 1868)
- Aubergina paetus (Godman & Salvin, 1887)
- Brangas carthaea (Hewitson, 1868)
- Brangas neora (Hewitson, 1867)
- Calycopis calus (Godart, [1824])
- Calycopis cerata (Hewitson, 1877)
- Calycopis demonassa (Hewitson, 1868)
- Calycopis isobeon (Butler & H. Druce, 1872)
- Calycopis pisis (Godman & Salvin, 1887)
- Calycopis trebula (Hewitson, 1868)
- Camissecla charichlorus (Butler & H. Druce, 1872)
- Celmia celmus (Cramer, 1775)
- Chalybs hassan (Stoll, 1790)
- Chalybs janias (Cramer, 1779)
- Chlorostrymon simaethis sarita (Skinner, 1895)
- Chlorostrymon telea (Hewitson, 1868)
- Cyanophrys agricolor (Butler & H. Druce, 1872)
- Cyanophrys amyntor (Cramer, 1775)
- Cyanophrys goodsoni (Clench, 1946)
- Cyanophrys herodotus (Fabricius, 1793)
- Cyanophrys longula (Hewitson, 1868)
- Electrostrymon hugon (Godart, [1824])
- Eumaeus childrenae (G. Gray, 1832)
- Eumaeus toxea (Godart, [1824])
- Evenus batesii (Hewitson, 1865)
- Evenus coronata (Hewitson, 1865)
- Evenus regalis (Cramer, 1775)
- Iaspis andersoni Robbins, 2010
- Iaspis temesa (Hewitson, 1868)
- Janthecla janthina (Hewitson, 1867)
- Kolana lyde (Godman & Salvin, 1887)
- Lamprospilus collucia (Hewitson, 1877)
- Laothus barajo (Reakirt, [1867])
- Laothus oceia (Godman & Salvin, 1887)
- Michaelus ira (Hewitson, 1867)
- Michaelus thordesa (Hewitson, 1867)
- Ministrymon azia (Hewitson, 1873)
- Ministrymon una scopas (Godman & Salvin, 1887)
- Nicolaea dolium (H. Druce, 1907)
- Oenomaus atena (Hewitson, 1867)
- Oenomaus ortygnus (Cramer, 1779)
- Ostrinotes keila (Hewitson, 1869)
- Ostrinotes purpuriticus (H. H. Druce, 1907)
- Panthiades bathildis (C. Felder & R. Felder, 1865)
- Panthiades bitias (Cramer, 1777)
- Panthiades phaleros (Linnaeus, 1767)
- Parrhasius moctezuma (Clench, 1971)
- Parrhasius orgia (Hewitson, 1867)
- Parrhasius polibetes (Stoll, 1781)
- Pseudolycaena damo (H. Druce, 1875)
- Rekoa marius (Lucas, 1857)
- Rekoa meton (Cramer, 1779)
- Rekoa palegon (Cramer, 1780)
- Rekoa stagira (Hewitson, 1867)
- Rekoa zebina (Hewitson, 1869)
- Semonina semones (Godman & Salvin, 1887)
- Strephonota sphinx (Fabricius, 1775)
- Strephonota tephraeus (Geyer, 1837)
- Strymon bazochii bazochii (Godart, [1824])
- Strymon megarus (Godart, [1824])
- Strymon serapio (Godman & Salvin, 1887)
- Strymon yojoa (Reakirt, [1867])
- Strymon ziba (Hewitson, 1868)
- Theclopsis leos (Schaus, 1913)
- Theclopsis mycon (Godman & Salvin, 1887)
- Thereus cithonius (Godart, [1824])
- Theritas hemon (Cramer, 1775)
- Theritas lisus (Stoll, 1790)
- Theritas mavors Hübner, 1818
- Theritas theocritus (Fabricius, 1793)
- Tmolus cydrara (Hewitson, 1868)
- Tmolus echion echiolus (Draudt, 1920)
- Ziegleria ceromia (Hewitson, 1877)
- Ziegleria hesperitis (Butler & H. Druce, 1872)

===== Polyommatinae =====
- Celastrina echo gozora (Boisduval, 1870)
- Cupido comyntas texana (F. Chermock, 1945)
- Echinargus huntingtoni hannoides (Clench, 1965)
- Hemiargus ceraunus astenidas (Lucas, 1857)
- Leptotes cassius cassidula (Boisduval, 1870)

==== Riodinidae ====
===== Euselasiinae =====
- Euselasia argentea (Hewitson, 1871)
- Euselasia aurantiaca aurantiaca (Godman & Salvin, 1868)
- Euselasia cataleuca (R. Felder, 1869)
- Euselasia chrysippe (H. W. Bates, 1866)
- Euselasia eubule (R. Felder, 1869)
- Euselasia hieronymi hieronymi (Godman & Salvin, 1868)
- Euselasia hypophaea (Godman & Salvin, 1878)
- Euselasia leucophyrna (Schaus, 1913)
- Euselasia regipennis eupepla (Godman & Salvin, 1885)
- Hades noctula Westwood, 1861

===== Riodininae =====
- Ancyluris inca inca (Saunders, 1850)
- Ancyluris jurgensenii jurgensenii (Saunders, 1850)
- Anteros formosus micon H. Druce, 1875
- Baeotis barce barce Hewitson, 1875
- Baeotis macularia (Boisduval, 1870)
- Baeotis zonata zonata R. Felder, 1869
- Calephelis argyrodines (H. W. Bates, 1866)
- Calephelis browni McAlpine, 1971
- Calephelis fulmen Stichel, 1910
- Calephelis laverna laverna (Godman & Salvin, 1886)
- Calephelis mexicana McAlpine, 1971
- Calephelis schausi McAlpine, 1971
- Calephelis sixola McAlpine, 1971
- Calephelis velutina (Godman & Salvin, 1878)
- Calicosama lilina (Butler, 1870)
- Calospila cilissa (Hewitson, 1863)
- Calospila pelarge (Godman & Salvin, 1878)
- Calydna sturnula (Geyer, 1837)
- Caria rhacotis (Godman & Salvin, 1878)
- Chalodeta lypera (H. W. Bates, 1868)
- Charis anius (Cramer, 1776)
- Chimastrum argenteum argenteum (H. W. Bates, 1866)
- Detritivora barnesi (J. Hall & Harvey, 2001)
- Emesis aurimna (Boisduval, 1870)
- Emesis lucinda (Cramer, 1775)
- Emesis lupina lupina Godman & Salvin, 1886
- Emesis mandana furor Butler & H. Druce, 1872
- Emesis ocypore aethalia H. W. Bates, 1868
- Emesis tegula Godman & Salvin, 1886
- Emesis tenedia C. Felder & R. Felder, 1861
- Eurybia elvina elvina Stichel, 1910
- Eurybia lycisca Westwood, 1851
- Eurybia patrona persona Staudinger, 1876
- Exoplisia cadmeis (Hewitson, 1866)
- Hyphilaria thasus (Stoll, 1780)
- Hypophylla sudias sudias (Hewitson, [1858])
- Hypophylla zeurippa Boisduval, 1836
- Isapis agyrtus hera Godman & Salvin, 1886
- Juditha caucana (Stichel, 1911)
- Lasaia agesilas callaina Clench, 1972
- Lasaia maria maria Clench, 1972
- Lasaia sula sula Staudinger, 1888
- Leucochimona lagora (Herrich-Schäffer, [1853])
- Leucochimona lepida nivalis (Godman & Salvin, 1885)
- Lyropteryx lyra cleadas H. Druce, 1875
- Melanis cephise (Menetries, 1855)
- Melanis electron melantho (Menetries, 1865)
- Melanis pixe sanguinea (Stichel, 1910)
- Menander menander purpurata (Godman & Salvin, 1878)
- Menander pretus picta (Godman & Salvin, 1886)
- Mesene croceella H. W. Bates, 1865
- Mesene margaretta margaretta (A. White, 1843)
- Mesene phareus (Cramer, 1777)
- Mesosemia gaudiolum H. W. Bates, 1865
- Mesosemia lamachus Hewitson, 1857
- Mesosemia telegone telegone (Boisduval, 1836)
- Mesosemia zonalis Godman & Salvin, 1885
- Monethe albertus rudolpus Godman & Salvin, 1885
- Napaea eucharila (H. W. Bates, 1867)
- Notheme erota diadema Stichel, 1910
- Nymphidium ascolia ascolia Hewitson, [1853]
- Pachythone gigas nigriciliata Schaus, 1913
- Peropthalma lasus Westwood, 1851
- Peropthalma tullius (Fabricius, 1787)
- Pirascca tyriotes (Godman & Salvin, 1878)
- Pseudonymphidia clearista (Butler, 1871)
- Rhetus arcius castigatus Stichel, 1909
- Rhetus periander Stichel, 1910
- Sarota acantus (Stoll, 1781)
- Sarota chrysus (Stoll, 1781)
- Sarota gamelia gamelia Godman & Salvin, 1886
- Sarota myrtea Godman & Salvin, 1886
- Sarota subtessellata (Schaus, 1913)
- Setabis lagus jansoni (Butler, 1870)
- Symmachia accusatrix Westwood, 1851
- Symmachia probetor probetor (Stoll, 1782)
- Synargis mycone (Hewitson, 1865)
- Synargis nymphidioides nymphidioides (Butler, 1872)
- Synargis phliasus velabrum (Godman & Salvin, 1878)
- Theope cratylus Godman & Salvin, 1886
- Theope eudocia Westwood, 1851
- Theope eupolis Schaus, 1890
- Theope mundula Stichel, 1926
- Theope pedias Herrich-Schäffer, [1853]
- Theope phaeo Prittwitz, 1865
- Theope pieridoides C. Felder & R. Felder, 1865
- Theope publius incompositus J. Hall, 1999
- Theope virgilius (Fabricius, 1793)
- Thisbe lycorias (Hewitson, [1853])
- Voltina umbra (Boisduval, 1870)
- Voltinia theata Stichel, 1910

==== Nymphalidae ====
===== Libytheinae =====
- Libytheana carinenta mexicana Michener, 1943

===== Danainae =====
- Anetia thirza thirza Geyer, [1833]
- Danaus eresimus montezuma Talbot, 1943
- Danaus gilippus thersippus (H. W. Bates, 1863)
- Danaus plexippus plexippus (Linnaeus, 1758)
- Lycorea halia atergatis (E. Doubleday, [1847])
- Lycorea ilione albescens (Distant, 1876)

====== Ithomiini ======
- Aeria eurimedia pacifica Godman & Salvin, 1879
- Callithomia hezia hedila Godman & Salvin, 1879
- Ceratinia tutia (Hewitson, 1852)
- Dircenna dero (Hübner, 1823)
- Dircenna jemina (Geyer, 1837)
- Dircenna klugi (Geyer, 1837)
- Episcada salvinia salvinia (H. Bates, 1864)
- Godyris nero (Hewitson, [1855])
- Godyris zavaleta sosunga (Reakirt, [1866])
- Greta annette (Guérin-Méneville, [1844])
- Greta andromica lyra (Salvin, 1869)
- Greta morgane oto (Hewitson, [1855])
- Hypoleria lavinia cassotis (H. W. Bates, 1864)
- Hyposcada virginiana virginiana (Hewitson, 1855)
- Hypothyris euclea valora (Haensch, 1909)
- Hypothyris lycaste dionaea (Hewitson, 1854)
- Ithomia patilla Hewitson, 1852
- Mechanitis lysimnia utemaia Reakirt, 1866
- Mechanitis menapis saturata Godman, 1901
- Mechanitis polymnia lycidice H. W. Bates, 1864
- Melinaea lilis imitata H. Bates, 1864
- Napeogenes tolosa tolosa (Hewitson, 1855)
- Oleria paula (Weymer, 1883)
- Oleria zea zea (Hewitson, [1855])
- Pteronymia alcmena (Godman & Salvin, 1877)
- Pteronymia artena artena (Hewitson, [1855])
- Pteronymia cotytto cotytto (Guérin-Méneville, [1844])
- Pteronymia simplex fenochioi Lamas, 1978
- Thyridia psidii melantho H. Bates, 1866
- Tithorea harmonia salvadoris Staudinger, 1885
- Tithorea tarricina pinthias Godman & Salvin, 1878

===== Limenitidinae =====
- Adelpha barnesia leucas Fruhstorfer, 1913
- Adelpha basiloides (H. W. Bates, 1865)
- Adelpha boeotia oberthurii (Boisduval, 1870)
- Adelpha cocala lorzae (Boisduval, 1870)
- Adelpha cytherea marcia Fruhstorfer, 1913
- Adelpha delinita utina A. Hall, 1938
- Adelpha donysa albifilum Steinhauser, 1974
- Adelpha erymanthis erymanthis Godman & Salvin, 1884
- Adelpha felderi (Boisduval, 1870)
- Adelpha fessonia fessonia (Hewitson, 1847)
- Adelpha iphicleola iphicleola (H. W. Bates, 1864)
- Adelpha iphiclus iphiclus (Linnaeus, 1758)
- Adelpha leuceria leuceria (H. Druce, 1874)
- Adelpha leuceroides Beutelspacher, 1975
- Adelpha lycorias melanthe (H. W. Bates, 1864)
- Adelpha malea fundania Fruhstorfer, 1915
- Adelpha melanthe melanthe (H. Bates, 1864)
- Adelpha messana messana (C. Felder & R. Felder, 1867)
- Adelpha milleri Beutelspacher, 1976
- Adelpha naxia naxia (C. Felder & R. Felder, 1867)
- Adelpha paraena massilia (C. Felder & R. Felder, 1867)
- Adelpha phylaca phylaca (H. W. Bates, 1866)
- Adelpha phylaca pseudothalia A. Hall, 1938
- Adelpha pithys (H. W. Bates, 1864)
- Adelpha salmoneus salmonides A. Hall 1938
- Adelpha serpa celerio (H. W. Bates, 1864)

===== Heliconiinae =====
- Actinote anteas (Doubleday, [1847])
- Actinote guatemalena guatemalena (H. Bates, 1864)
- Agraulis vanillae incarnata (N. Riley, 1926)
- Altinote ozomene nox (H. W. Bates, 1864)
- Dione juno huascuma (Reakirt, 1866)
- Dione moneta poeyii ( Butler, 1873)
- Dryadula phaetusa (Linnaeus, 1758)
- Dryas iulia moderata (N. Riley, 1926)
- Eueides aliphera gracilis Stichel, 1904
- Eueides isabella eva (Fabricius, 1793)
- Eueides lineata Salvin & Godman, 1868
- Eueides procula asidia Schaus, 1920
- Euptoieta hegesia meridiania Stichel, 1938
- Heliconius charitonia vazquezae Comstock & Brown, 1950
- Heliconius cydno galanthus H. W. Bates, 1864
- Heliconius doris viridis Staudinger, 1885
- Heliconius erato petiverana (Doubleday, 1847)
- Heliconius hecale discomaculatus Weymer, 1891
- Heliconius hecale zuleika Hewitson, 1854
- Heliconius hecalesia octavia H. W. Bates, 1866
- Heliconius hortense Guérin-Méneville, [1844]
- Heliconius ismenius telchinia Doubleday, 1847
- Heliconius sapho leuce Doubleday, 1847
- Heliconius sara veraepacis H. W. Bates, 1864
- Philaethria diatonica (Fruhstorfer, 1912)

===== Apaturinae =====
- Asterocampa idyja argus (H. Bates, 1864)
- Doxocopa callianira (Menetries, 1855)
- Doxocopa cyane mexicana Bryk, 1953
- Doxocopa laure laure (Drury, 1773)
- Doxocopa laurentina cherubina (C. Felder & R. Felder, 1867)
- Doxocopa pavon theodora (Lucas, 1857)

===== Biblidinae =====
- Biblis hyperia aganisa Boisduval, 1836
- Mestra amymone (Ménétriés, 1857)

====== Catonephelini ======
- Catonephele chromis godmani Stichel, 1901
- Catonephele mexicana Jenkins & R. G. de la Maza, 1985
- Catonephele numilia esite (R. Felder, 1869)
- Ectima erycinoides C. Felder & R. Felder, 1867
- Eunica alcmena alcmena (Doubleday, [1847])
- Eunica alpais excelsa Godman & Salvin, 1877
- Eunica caelina agusta H. W. Bates, 1866
- Eunica caralis caralis (Hewitson, [1857])
- Eunica chlororhoa mira Godman & Salvin, 1877
- Eunica malvina albida Jenkins, 1990
- Eunica monima (Stoll, 1782)
- Eunica mygdonia omoa A, Hall, 1919
- Eunica pomona amata H. Druce, 1874
- Eunica sydonia caresa (Hewitson, [1857])
- Eunica tatila tatila (Herrich-Schäffer [1885])
- Eunica volumna venusia (C. Felder & R. Felder, 1867)
- Myscelia cyaniris cyaniris Doubleday, [1848]
- Myscelia ethusa pattenia Butler & H. Druce, 1872
- Nessaea aglaura aglaura (Doubleday, [1848])

====== Ageroniini ======
- Hamadryas amphinome mexicana (Lucas, 1853)
- Hamadryas atlantis atlantis (H. Bates, 1864)
- Hamadryas februa ferentina (Godart, [1824])
- Hamadryas feronia farinulenta (Fruhstorfer, 1916)
- Hamadryas fornax fornacalia (Fruhstorfer, 1907)
- Hamadryas glauconome glauconome (H. Bates, 1864)
- Hamadryas guatemalena guatemalena (H. Bates, 1864)
- Hamadryas iphthime joannae Jenkins, 1983
- Hamadryas laodamia saurites (Fruhstorfer, 1916)

====== Epiphelini ======
- Bolboneura sylphis sylphis (H. Bates, 1864)
- Epiphile adrasta adrasta Hewitson, 1861
- Nica flavilla canthara (Doubleday, 1849)
- Pyrrhogyra edocla edocla Doubleday, [1848]
- Pyrrhogyra neaerea hypensor Godman & Salvin, 1884
- Pyrrhogyra otolais otolais H. W. Bates, 1864
- Temenis laothoe hondurensis Fruhstorfer, 1907

====== Eubagini ======
- Dynamine artemisia (Fabricius, 1793)
- Dynamine ate (Godman & Salvin, 1883)
- Dynamine dyonis Geyer, 1837
- Dynamine paulina thalassina (Boisduval, 1870)
- Dynamine postverta mexicana d'Almeida, 1952
- Dynamine theseus (C. Felder & R. Felder, 1861)

====== Callicorini ======
- Callicore astarte patelina (Hewitson, 1853)
- Callicore lyca lyca (Doubleday, [1847])
- Callicore pitheas (Latreille, [1813])
- Callicore texa titania (Salvin, 1869)
- Callicore tolima guatemalena (H. Bates), 1866
- Callicore tolima peralta (Dillon, 1948)
- Diaethria anna anna (Guérin-Méneville, [1844])
- Diaethria astala astala (Guérin-Méneville, [1844])
- Diaethria pandama (Doubleday, [1848])

===== Cyrestinae =====
- Marpesia berania fruhstorferi (Seitz, 1914)
- Marpesia chiron (Fabricius, 1775)
- Marpesia corita corita (Westwood, 1850)
- Marpesia marcella valetta (Butler & H. Druce, 1872)
- Marpesia merops (Doyère, [1840])
- Marpesia petreus (Cramer, 1776)
- Marpesia zerynthia dentigera (Fruhstorfer, 1907)

===== Nymphalinae =====
====== Coeini ======
- Baeotus baeotus (Doubleday, [1849])
- Historis acheronta acheronta (Fabricius, 1775)
- Historis odius dious Lamas, 1995
- Pycina zamba zelys Godman & Salvin, 1884

====== Nymphalini ======
- Colobura dirce dirce (Linnaeus, 1758)
- Hypanartia dione disjuncta Willmott et al., 2001
- Hypartnartia lethe (Fabricius, 1793)
- Smyrna blomfildia datis Fruhstorfer, 1908
- Smyrna karwinskii Geyer, [1833]
- Tigridia acesta (Linnaeus, 1758)
- Vanessa cardui (Linnaeus, 1758)
- Vanessa virginiensis (Drury, 1773)

====== Victorinini ======
- Anartia fatima fatima (Fabricius, 1793)
- Anartia jatrophae luteipicta (Fruhstorfer, 1907)
- Siproeta epaphus epaphus (Latreille, 1813)
- Siproeta stelenes biplagiata (Fruhstorfer, 1907)

====== Junoniini ======
- Junonia evarete (Cramer, 1779)

====== Melitaeini ======
- Anthanassa ardys (Hewitson, 1864)
- Anthanassa argentea (Godman & Salvin, 1882)
- Anthanassa atronia (H. Bates, 1866)
- Anthanassa dracaena phlegias (Godman, 1901)
- Anthanassa drusilla lelex (H. Bates, 1864)
- Anthanassa drymaea (Godman & Salvin, 1878)
- Anthanassa otanes otanes (Hewitson, 1864)
- Anthanassa ptolyca ptolyca (H. Bates, 1864)
- Anthanassa sitalces sitalces (Godman & Salvin, 1882)
- Anthanassa tulcis (H. Bates, 1864)
- Castilia griseobasalis (Röber, 1913)
- Castilia myia (Hewitson, [1864])
- Chlosyne ezra (Hewitson, 1864)
- Chlosyne gaudialis gaudialis (H. Bates, 1864)
- Chlosyne janais janais (Drury, 1782)
- Chlosyne lacinia lacinia (Geyer, 1837)
- Chlosyne theona theona (Menetries, 1855)
- Eresia clio clio (Linnaeus, 1758)
- Eresia phillyra phillyra Hewitson, 1852
- Microtia elva elva H. Bates, 1864
- Tegosa anieta luka (H. Bates, 1866)
- Tegosa claudina (Eschscholtz, 1821)
- Tegosa nigrella nigrella (H. Bates, 1866)

===== Charaxinae =====
- Agrias aedon rodriguezi Schaus, 1918
- Agrias amydon lacandona R. G. & J. de la Maza, 1999
- Anaea aidea (Guérin-Méneville, [1844])
- Archaeoprepona amphimachus amphiktion (Fruhstorfer, 1916)
- Archaeoprepona demophon centralis (Fruhstorfer, 1905)
- Archaeoprepona demophon gulina (Fruhstorfer, 1904)
- Archaeoprepona menander phoebus (Boisduval, 1870)
- Consul fabius cecrops (Doubleday, [1849])
- Fountainea eurypyle confusa (A. Hall, 1929)
- Memphis arginussa eubaena (Boisduval, 1870)
- Memphis artacaena (Hewitson, 1869)
- Memphis aureola (H. Bates, 1866)
- Memphis beatrix (H. Druce, 1874)
- Memphis dia dia (Godman & Salvin, 1884)
- Memphis glauce centralis (Röber, 1916)
- Memphis hedemanni (R. Felder, 1869)
- Memphis lyceus (H. Druce, 1877)
- Memphis mora orthesia (Godman & Salvin, 1884)
- Memphis moruus boisduvali (W. Comstock, 1961)
- Memphis neidhoeferi (Rotger, Escalante, & Coronado, 1965)
- Memphis oenomais (Boisduval, 1870)
- Memphis pithyusa pithyusa (R. Felder, 1869)
- Memphis proserpina (Salvin, 1869)
- Prepona dexamenus medinai Beutelspacher, 1981
- Prepona laertes octavia Fruhstorfer, 1905
- Prepona pylene gnorima H. Bates, 1865
- Prepona pylene philetas Fruhstorfer, 1904
- Siderone galanthis (Cramer, 1775)
- Siderone syntyche syntyche Hewitson, [1854])
- Zaretis callidryas (R. Felder, 1869)
- Zaretis ellops (Ménétriés, 1855)
- Zaretis itys itys (Cramer, 1777)

===== Satyrinae =====
====== Morphini ======
- Antirrhea philoctetes lindigii C. Felder & R. Felder, 1862
- Morpho achilles patroclus C. Felder & R. Felder, 1861
- Morpho cypris aphrodite LeMoult & Réal, 1962
- Morpho helenor montezuma (Guenée, 1859)
- Morpho polyphemus catalina Corea & Chacón, 1984
- Morpho polyphemus luna Butler, 1869
- Morpho theseus arotos (Frustorfer, 1905)
- Morpho theseus justitiae Salvin & Godman, 1868

===== Brassolinae =====
- Caligo brasiliensis sulanus Fruhstorfer, 1904
- Caligo illioneus oberon Butler, 1870
- Caligo oedipus fruhstorferi Stichel, 1904
- Caligo oileus scamander (Boisduval, 1870)
- Caligo telemonius memnon (C. Felder & R. Felder, 1867)
- Caligo uranus Herrich-Schäffer, 1850
- Catoblepia orgetorix orgetorix (Hewitson, 1870)
- Dynastor darius stygianus Buter, 1872
- Dynastor macrosiris strix Bates, 1864
- Eryphanis aesacus (Herrich-Schäffer, 1850)
- Eryphanis lycomedon (C. Felder & R. Felder, 1862)
- Narope testacea Godman & Salvin, 1878
- Opsiphanes bogotanus alajuela Bristow, 1991
- Opsiphanes boisduvallii Doubleday, [1849]
- Opsiphanes cassiae castaneus Stichel, 1904
- Opsiphanes cassina fabricii (Boisduval, 1870)
- Opsiphanes invirae relucens Fruhstorfer, 1907
- Opsiphanes quiteria quirinus Godman & Salvin, 1881
- Opsiphanes tamarindi tamarindi C. Felder & R. Felder, 1861

====== Haeterini ======
- Cithaerias pireta pireta (Stoll, 1780)
- Pierella helvina incanescens Godman & Salvin, 1877
- Pierella luna pallida (Salvin & Godman, 1868)
- Pierella luna rubecula Salvin & Godman, 1868

====== Melanitini ======
- Manataria hercyna maculata (Hopffer, 1874)

====== Satyrini ======
- Cissia labe (Butler, 1870)
- Cissia pompilia (C. Felder & R. Felder, 1867)
- Cissia similis (Butler, 1867)
- Cissia themis (Butler, 1867)
- Cyllopsis hedemanni hedemanni R. Felder, 1869
- Cyllopsis hilaria (Godman, 1901)
- Cyllopsis pephredo (Godman, 1901)
- Cyllopsis pyracmon pyracmon (Butler, [1867])
- Cyllopsis steinhauserorum L. Miller, 1974
- Cyllopsis suivalenoides L. Miller, 1974
- Euptychia hilaria (C. Felder & R. Felder, 1867)
- Euptychia westwoodi Butler, 1867
- Hermeuptychia hermes (Fabricius, 1775)
- Magneuptychia libye (Linnaeus, 1767)
- Megeuptychia antonoe (Cramer, 1775)
- Oxeoschistus tauropolis (Westwood, [1850])
- Pareuptychia metaleuca (Boisduval, 1870)
- Pareuptychia ocirrhoe (Fabricius, 1776)
- Satyrotaygetis satyrina (H. W. Baters, 1865)
- Taygetis laches (Fabricius, 1793)
- Taygetis mermeria excavata Butler, 1868
- Taygetis rufomarginata Staudinger, 1888
- Taygetis thamyra (Cramer, 1779)
- Taygetis virgilia (Cramer, 1776)
- Taygetomorpha celia (Cramer, 1779)

== Moths ==
=== Hepialoidea ===
==== Hepialidae ====
- Druceiella sp.

=== Tineoidea ===
==== Psychidae ====
- Cryptothelea gloverii (Packard, 1869)
- Cryptothelea symmicta (Dyar, 1914)
- Oiketicus geyeri Berg, 1877
- Oiketicus kirbyi Guilding, 1827
- Oiketicus sp.

==== Arrhenophanidae ====
- Arrhenophanes perspicilla (Stoll, 1790)

==== Acrolophidae ====
- Acrolophus sp.

=== Gracillarioidea ===
==== Gracillariidae ====
- Phyllocnistis citrella Stainton, 1856

=== Yponomeutoidea ===
==== Yponomeutidae ====
- Atteva aurea (Fabricius, 1798)

==== Plutellidae ====
- Plutella xylostella (Linnaeus, 1758)

==== Heliodinidae ====
- Aetole bella Chambers, 1875

==== Lyonetiidae ====
- Perileucoptera coffeella (Guérin-Méneville, 1842)

=== Gelechioidea ===
==== Elachistidae ====
- Ethmia catapeltica Meyrick, 1924
- Ethmia lichyi Powell 1973
- Ethmia perpulchra Walsingham, 1912
- Ethmia scythropa Walsingham, 1912
- Ethmia similatella Busck, 1920
- Ethmia ungulatella Busck, 1914
- Stenoma catenifer Walsingham, 1912
- Stenoma exarata (Zeller, 1854)
- Stenoma impressella (Busck, 1914)
- Stenoma patens Meyrick, 1913

==== Glyphidoceridae ====
- Glyphidocera spp. 1–4

==== Oecophoridae ====
- Antaeotricha cosmoterma (Meyrick, 1930)
- Antaeotricha particularis (Zeller, 1877)
- Antaeotricha spp. 1–5
- Cerconota anonella (Sepp, 1830)

=== Blastobasinae ===
- Blastobasis sp.

==== Cosmopterigidae ====
- Pyroderces badia (Hodges, 1962)
- Pyroderces rileyi (Walsingham, 1882)

==== Gelechiidae ====
- Keiferia lycopersicella (Walsingham, 1897)
- Phthorimaea operculella (Zeller, 1873)
- Sitotroga cerealella (Oliver, 1789)
- Trichotaphe arotrosema (Walsingham, 1911)

=== Zygaenoidea ===
==== Megalopygidae ====
- Aithorape sp.
- Macara nigripes (Dyar, 1909)
- Megalopyge albicollis (Walker, 1855)
- Megalopyge lanata (Cramer, 1780)
- Megalopyge opercularis J. E. Smith, 1797
- Megalopyge sp.
- Mesoscia dumilla Dyar, 1913
- Mesoscia pusilla (Stoll, 1782)
- Podalia contigua (Walker, 1886)
- Podalia orsilochia (Cramer, 1775)
- Podalia tympania (Druce, 1897)
- Trosia nigropunctigera (D. S. Fletcher, 1982)

==== Limacodidae ====
- Acharia horrida (Dyar, 1905)
- Euclea bidiscalis Dyar, 1926
- Euclea mesoamericana Epstein & Corrales, 2004
- Euclea sp. 1
- Euclea sp. 2
- Miresa clarissa (Stoll, 1790)
- Natada cecilia Corrales & Epstein, 2000
- Natada confusa Corrales & Epstein, 2003
- Natada fusca (Druce, 1887)
- Parasa minima Schaus, 1892
- Parasa joanae Epstein, 2004
- Parasa viridogrisea Dyar, 1898
- Perola invaria (Walker, 1855)
- Perola sericea (Möschler, 1878)
- Phobetron hipparchia (Cramer, [1777])
- Prolimacodes undifera (Walker, 1855)
- Prolimacodes triangulifera Schaus, 1896
- Semyra finita Walker, 1855
- Talima aurora Dyar, 1926
- Talima postica Dyar, 1926

==== Dalceridae ====
- Acraga coa (Schaus, 1892)
- Acraga sp.
- Dalcerides alba (Druce, 1887)
- Dalcerides mesoa (Druce, 1887)
- Dalcerides sp.
- Paracraga argentea (Schaus, 1910)

==== Zygaenidae ====
- Harrisina mystica (Walker, 1854)

=== Cossoidea ===
==== Cossidae ====
- Aramos ramosa (Schaus, 1892)
- Biocellata alfarae (Schaus, 1911)
- Brypoctia strigifer (Dyar, 1910)
- Cossula arpi Schaus, 1901
- Cossula tacita (Druce, 1898)
- Givira basiplaga (Schaus, 1905)
- Givira daphne Druce, 1901
- Givira juturna (Schaus, 1892)
- Givira modisma Schaus, 1921
- Inguromorpha sandelphon (Dyar, 1912)
- Langsdorfia lunifera Dyar, 1937
- Morpheis cognata (Walker, 1856)
- Morpheis comisteon Schaus, 1911
- Morpheis pyracmon (Cramer, 1780)

=== Sesioidea ===
==== Sesiidae ====
- Carmenta mimosa Eichlin & Passoa, 1983
- Melittia cucurbitae Harris, 1828
- Sophona hondurasensis Eichlin, 1986

==== Castniidae ====
===== Castniinae =====
- Amauta cacica procera (Boisduval, [1875])
- Athis clitarcha (Westwood, 1877)
- Athis inca inca (Walker, 1854)
- Divana diva diva (Butler, [1870])
- Telchin atymnius futilis (Walker, 1856)
- Telchin licus (Drury, 1773)

=== Choreutoidea ===
==== Choreutidae ====
- Brenthia sp.
- Hemerophila tristis (Felder & Rogenhofer, 1875)
- Tortyra sp.

=== Tortricoidea ===
==== Tortricidae ====
- Aethesoides hondurasica Razowski, 1986
- Amorbia productana (Walker, 1863)
- Cydia semicirculana (Walker, 1863)
- Eugnosta emarcida (Razowski & Becker 1986)
- Eugnosta fraudulenta Razowski & Becker 2007
- Icteralaria idiochroma J. W. Brown, 1996
- Mictopsichia cubae Razowski, 2009
- Mimeugnosta particeps Razowski, 1986
- Platynota rostrana (Walker, 1863)
- Pseudatteria volcanica (Butler, 1872)
- Rhyacionia frustrana (Comstock, 1880)
- Sparganothina anopla B. Landry, 2001

=== Alucitoidea ===
==== Alucitidae ====
- Alucita sp.

=== Pterophoroidea ===
==== Pterophoridae ====
- Adaina beckeri Gielis, 1992
- Adaina ipomoeae Bigot & Etienne, 2009
- Adaina simplicius (Grossbeck, 1917)
- Amblyptilia landryi Gielis, 2006
- Anstenoptilia marmarodactyla (Dyar, [1903])
- Hellinsia sp. 1-3
- Leptodeuterocopus sp.
- Lioptilodes albistriolatus (Zeller, 1877)
- Megalorhipida dulcis (Walsingham, 1915)
- Megalorhipida leucodactylus (Fabricius, 1794)
- Michaelophorus dentiger (Meyrick, 1916)
- Michaelophorus nubilus (Felder & Rogenhofer, 1875)
- Ochyrotica sp.
- Sphenarches anisodactylus (Walker, 1864)
- Stenoptilodes brevipennis (Zeller, 1874)

=== Hyblaeoidea ===
==== Hyblaeidae ====
- Hyblaea puera (Cramer, 1777)

=== Pyraloidea ===
==== Crambidae ====
===== Crambinae =====
- Argyria sp.
- Argyria centrifugens Dyar, 1914
- Diatraea lineolata (Walker, 1856)
- Diatraea saccharalis (Fabricius, 1794)
- Fissicrambus minuellus (Walker, 1863)
- Microcausta sp.
- Microcramboides meretricellus (Schaus, 1913)
- Microcrambus pusionellus (Zeller, 1863)
- Microcrambus tactellus (Dyar, 1914)
- Myelobia smerintha Hübner, [1821]
- Parapediasia tenuistrigata (Zeller, 1881)
- Tortriculladia eucosmella (Dyar, 1914)
- Tortriculladia sp.

===== Schoenobiinae =====
- Proschoenobius subcervinellus (Walker, 1863)
- Rupela albina Becker & Solis, 1990

===== Glaphyriinae =====
- Aethiophysa dimotalis (Walker, [1866])
- Cosmopterosis spatha Solis, 2009
- Dicymolomia metalophota (Hampson, 1897)
- Hellula phidilealis (Walker, 1859)
- Lipocosma calla (Kaye, 1901)
- Pseudoligostigma enareralis (Dyar, 1914)
- Schacontia ysticalis (Dyar, 1925)

===== Musotiminae =====
- Neurophyseta camptogrammalis Hampson, 1912
- Undulambia polystichalis Capps, 1965

===== Midilinae =====
- Dismidila atoca Dyar, 1914
- Dismidila drepanoides Monroe, 1970
- Dismidila sp.
- Midila centralis Munroe, 1970
- Midila daphne daphne (Druce, 1895)

===== Acentropinae =====
- Argyractoides nr. lucianalis (Schaus, 1924)
- Argyractoides leucogonialis (Hampson, 1906)
- Argyractoides sp.
- Aulacodes aechmialis Guenée, 1854 KC x
- Aulacodes sp. 1-2
- Chrysendeton romanalis (Druce, 1896)
- Neargyractis sp.
- Oxyelophila necomalis (Dyar, 1914)
- Oxyelophila puralis (Schaus, 1912)
- Oxyelophila sp.
- Parapoynx endoralis (Walker, 1859)
- Petrophila argyrolepta (Dyar, 1914)
- Petrophila iolepta (Dyar, 1914)
- Petrophila mignonalis (Dyar, 1914)
- Petrophila zelota (Dyar, 1914)
- Petrophila parvissimalis (Schaus, 1912)
- Petrophila spp. 1–8
- Usingeriessa onyxalis (Hampson, 1897)

===== Odontiinae =====
- Dicepolia rufitinctalis (Hampson, 1899)

===== Evergestinae =====
- Symphysa sp.
- Trischistognatha pyrenealis (Walker, 1859)

===== Pyraustinae =====
- Anania inclusalis (Walker, [1866])
- Aponia minnithalis (Druce, 1895)
- Epicorsia alvilalis Amsel, 1954
- Epicorsia sp.
- Hyalorista limasalis (Walker, 1886)
- Hyalorista taeniolalis (Guenée, 1854)
- Munroeodes thalesalis (Walker, 1859)
- Oenobotys vinotinctalis (Hampson, 1895)
- Portentomorpha xanthialis (Guenée, 1854)
- Pyrausta bicoloralis (Guenée, 1854)
- Pyrausta insignitalis (Guenée, 1854)
- Triuncidia ossealis (Hampson, 1899)

===== Spilomelinae =====
- Agathodes designalis Guenée, 1854
- Anarmodia nebulosalis Dognin, 1903
- Apilocrocis excelsalis (Schaus, 1912)
- Apogeshna acestealis (Walker, 1859)
- Apogeshna stenialis (Guenée, 1854)
- Arthromastix lauralis (Walker, 1859)
- Asturodes fimbriauralis (Guenée, 1854)
- Ategumia actealis (Walker, 1859)
- Ategumia dilecticolor (Dyar, 1912)
- Ategumia ebulealis (Guenée, 1854)
- Ategumia matutinalis (Guenée 1854)
- Ategumia sp.
- Atomopteryx doeri Walsingham, 1891
- Azochis gripusalis Walker, 1859
- Azochis mactalis (Felder & Rogenhofer, 1875)
- Blepharomastix benetinctalis (Dyar, 1914)
- Blepharomastix coeneusalis (Walker, 1859)
- Blepharomastix costaliparilis Munroe, 1995
- Bocchoropsis plenilinealis (Dyar, 1917)
- Cirrhocephalina brunneivena (Hampson, 1913)
- Coenostolopsis apicalis (Lederer, 1863)
- Compacta hirtalis (Guenée, 1854)
- Conchylodes arcifera Hampson, 1912
- Conchylodes nolckenialis (Snellen, 1875)
- Conchylodes platinalis (Guenée, 1854)
- Conchylodes salamisalis Druce, 1895
- Cryptobotys zoilusalis (Walker, 1859)
- Desmia albisectalis (Dognin, 1905)
- Desmia bajulalis Guenée, 1854
- Desmia cristinae Schaus, 1912
- Desmia daedala Druce, 1895
- Desmia extrema (Walker, 1856)
- Desmia odontoplaga Hampson, 1899
- Desmia sepulchralis Guenée, 1854
- Desmia vulcanalis (Felder & Rogenhofer, 1875)
- Desmia sp. 1-4
- Deuterophysa albilunalis (Hampson, 1913)
- Diaphania arguta (Lederer, 1863)
- Diaphania costata (Fabricius, 1794)
- Diaphania esmeralda (Hampson, 1899)
- Diaphania exclusalis (Walker, [1866])
- Diaphania hyalinata (Linnaeus, 1767)
- Diaphania latilimbalis (Guenée, 1854)
- Diaphania modialis (Dyar, 1912)
- Diaphania nitidalis (Cramer, 1781)
- Diaphania sp.
- Dichocrocis clystalis Schaus, 1920
- Dichocrocis sabatalis (Druce, 1895)
- Dichocrosis tlapalis Schaus, 1920
- Epipagis fenestralis (Hübner, 1796)
- Eulepte concordalis Hübner, [1825] 1826
- Glyphodes rubrocinctalis (Guenée, 1854)
- Glyphodes sibillalis sibillalis Walker, 1859
- Gonocausta zephyralis Lederer, 1863
- Herpetogramma bipunctalis (Fabricius, 1794)
- Herpetogramma cervinicosta (Hampson, 1918)
- Herpetogramma salbialis (Hampson, 1899)
- Hoterodes ausonia (Cramer, 1777)
- Hymenia perspectalis (Hübner, 1796)
- Lamprosema cayugalis Schaus, 1920
- Lamprosema lunulalis Hübner, 1823
- Lamprosema nr. moccalis Schaus, 1920
- Lamprosema sp.
- Leucochroma sp. nr. corope (Cramer, 1781)
- Leucochromodes melusinalis (Walker, 1859)
- Lineodes fontella Walsingham, 1913
- Lineodes mesodonta Hampson, 1913
- Lineodes triangulalis Möschler, 1890
- Lineodes tridentalis Hampson, 1913
- Lygropia acastalis (Walker, 1859)
- Lypotigris reginalis (Cramer, 1781)
- Maracayia chlorisalis (Walker, 1859)
- Marasmia cochrusalis (Walker, 1859)
- Marasmia trapezalis (Guenée, 1854) USNM
- Maruca vitrata (Fabricius, 1787)
- Massepha lupa (Druce, 1899)
- Megastes grandalis Guenée, 1854
- Megastes sp.
- Metoeca foedalis (Guenée, 1854)
- Microphysetica hermeasalis (Walker, 1859)
- Microthyris anormalis (Guenée, 1854)
- Microthyris prolongalis (Guenée, 1854)
- Mimophobetron pyropsalis (Hampson, 1904)
- Neoleucinodes elegantalis (Guenée, 1854)
- Neoleucinodes imperialis (Guenée, 1854)
- Nonazochis graphialis (Schaus, 1912)
- Omiodes humeralis Guenée, 1854
- Omiodes indicata (Fabricius, 1775)
- Omiodes janzeni Gentili & Solis, 1998
- Omiodes martini Amsel, 1956
- Omiodes martyralis (Lederer, 1863)
- Omiodes pandaralis (Walker, 1858)
- Omiodes simialis Guenée, 1854
- Omiodes stigmosalis (Warren, 1892)
- Omiodes spp. 1–5
- Palpita flegia (Cramer, 1777)
- Palpusia terminalis (Dognin, 1910)
- Palpusia sp.
- Pantographa expansalis (Lederer, 1863)
- Pantographa suffusalis Druce, 1895
- Pantographa sp.
- Phaedropsis chromalis (Guenée, 1854)
- Phaedropsis maritzalis (Schaus, 1920)
- Phostria mapetalis (Schaus, 1912)
- Phostria tedea (Cramer, 1781)
- Phostria sp.
- Phrygonodes plicatalis Guenée, 1854
- Pilocrocis cryptalis (Druce, 1895)
- Pilocrocis cyranoalis Schaus, 1920
- Pilocrocis ramentalis Lederer, 1863
- Pilocrocis sp.
- Polygrammodes elevata (Fabricius, 1794)
- Polygrammodes flavidalis (Guenée, 1854)
- Polygrammodes hyalomaculata hyalomaculata Dognin, 1908
- Polygrammodes ponderalis (Guenée, 1854)
- Polygrammodes rufinalis Hampson, 1899
- Prenesta fenestrinalis (Guenée, 1854)
- Prenesta scyllalis (Walker, 1859)
- Psara prumnides (Druce, 1895)
- Pycnarmon cecinalis (Dognin, 1897)
- Sacculosia isaralis (Felder & Rogenhofer, 1875)
- Salbia haemorrhoidalis (Guenée, 1854)
- Salbia pepitalis (Guenée, 1854)
- Salbia tytiusalis (Walker, 1859)
- Samea delicata Kaye, 1923
- Samea ecclesialis Guenée, 1854
- Samea multiplicalis (Guenée, 1854)
- Samea nicaeusalis (Walker, 1859)
- Sisyracera subulalis (Guenée, 1854)
- Sparagmia gonoptera (Latreille, 1828)
- Spilomela discordens Dyar, 1914
- Spilomela pantheralis (Geyer, 1832)
- Spilomela sp.
- Spoladea recurvalis (Fabricius, 1775)
- Steniodes acuminalis (Dyar, 1914)
- Steniodes mendica (Hedemann, 1894)
- Sufetula diminutalis (Walker, [1866])
- Syllepis hortalis (Walker, 1859)
- Syllepte amando (Cramer, 1779)
- Syllepte belialis (Walker, 1859)
- Syllepte dioptalis (Walker, [1866])
- Synclera chlorophasma (Butler, 1878)
- Synclera jarbusalis (Walker, 1859)
- Syngamia florella (Cramer, 1781)
- Syngamilyta apicolor (Druce, 1902)
- Syngamilyta samarialis (Druce, 1899)
- Terastia meticulosalis Guenée, 1854
- Trichaea pilicornis Herrich-Schäffer, 1866
- Trichaea sp.

==== Pyralidae ====
===== Pyralinae =====
- Hypsopygia craspedalis (Hampson, 1906)
- Hypsopygia graafialis (Snellen, 1875)
- Hypsopygia resectalis (Lederer, 1863)

===== Chrysauginae =====
- Azamora splendens (Druce, 1895)
- Bonchis munitalis (Lederer, 1863)
- Bonchis scoparioides Walker, 1862
- Caphys biliniata (Stoll, 1781)
- Caphys subrosealis (Walker, [1866])
- Carcha hersilialis Walker, 1859
- Carcha violalis Hampson, 1897
- Clydonopteron pomponius Druce, 1895
- Clydonopteron sp.
- Dasycnema obliqualis (Hampson, 1897)
- Galasa strenualis Dyar, 1914
- Galasa striginervalis Hampson, 1906
- Galasa sp. 1-3
- Hyperparachma bursarialis (Walker, [1866])
- Hyperparachma sp.
- Lophopleura eurzonalis Hampson, 1897
- Parachma meterythra Hampson, 1897
- Salobrena atropurpurea Hampson, 1906
- Salobrena vacuana (Walker, 1863)
- Tetrachistis paula Schaus, 1904
- Xantippe olivalis Dyar, 1914
- Zanclodes falculalis Ragonot, 1891

===== Epipaschiinae =====
- Accinctapubes albifasciata (Druce, 1902)
- Anarnatula sylea (Druce, 1899)
- Arnatula circumlucens Dyar, 1914
- Calybitia adolescens (Dyar, 1914)
- Carthara albicosta Walker, 1865
- Chloropaschia selecta (Schaus, 1912)
- Deuterollyta cantianilla (Schaus, 1925)
- Deuterollyta majuscula Herrich-Schäffer, 1871
- Deuterollyta ragonoti Möschler, 1890
- Epipaschia mesoleucalis (Hampson, 1916)
- Lepidogma modana Schaus, 1922
- Macalla thyrsisalis Walker, [1859]
- Macalla finstanalis Schaus, 1922
- Milgithea melanoleuca (Hampson, 1896)
- Pandoflabella olivescens (Schaus, 1912)
- Phidotricha erigens Ragonot, 1888
- Pococera narthusa Schaus, 1913
- Pococera gelidalis (Walker, [1866])
- Pococera sp.
- Tallula fovealis Hampson, 1906
- Tallula melazonalis Hampson, 1906
- Tancoa crinita (Schaus, 1912)
- Tancoa calitas (Druce, 1899)
- Tancoa sp.

===== Phycitinae =====
- Anabasis ochrodesma (Zeller, 1881)
- Caudellia declivella (Zeller, 1881)
- Davara caricae (Dyar, 1913)
- Difundella sp.
- Dioryctria batesella Mutuura & Neunzig, 1986
- Dioryctria erythropasa (Dyar, 1914)
- Dioryctria sp.
- Drescomopis soraella (Druce, 1899)
- Ectomyelois muriscis (Dyar, 1914)
- Eurythmidia ignidorsella (Ragonot, 1887)
- Piesmopoda sp.
- Tlascala reductella (Walker, 1863)
- Ufa rubedinella (Zeller, 1848)

=== Thyridoidea ===
==== Thyrididae ====
- Banisia furva epasta Whalley, 1976
- Draconia rusina Druce, 1895
- Draconia denticulata (Pagenstecher, 1892)
- Dysodia sp. 1-2
- Gippius sumptuosus Walker, 1855
- Microsca sp.
- Pseudendromis thetis (Druce, 1899)
- Rhodoneura nebulosa (Warren, 1889)
- Zeuzerodes fumatilis (Pagenstecher, 1892)
- undetermined sp. 1-4

=== Mimallonoidea ===
==== Mimallonidae ====
- Cicinnus sp.
- Druentica partha (Schaus, 1905)
- Roelmana maloba (Scahus, 1905)

=== Lasiocampoidea ===
==== Lasiocampidae ====
- Artace cribraria (Ljungh, 1825)
- Euglyphis amathuria Druce, 1890
- Euglyphis amisena (Druce, 1890)
- Euglyphis canifascia (Walker, 1869)
- Euglyphis cercina (Druce, 1897)
- Euglyphis guttularis (Walker, 1855)
- Euglyphis poasia Schaus, 1910
- Euglyphis thyatira (Druce, 1887)
- Euglyphis zurcheri Druce, 1897
- Euglyphis sp. 1-2
- Eutachyptera psidii Sallé, 1857
- Nesara casada (Schaus, 1911)
- Nesara sp.
- Prorifrons sp.
- Tolype caieta Druce, 1897

=== Bombycoidea ===
==== Bombycidae ====
- Apatelodes satellitia (Walker, 1855)
- Apatelodes merlona Schaus, 1939
- Colla coelestis Schaus, 1910
- Epia muscosa (Butler, 1878)
- Epia casnonia (Druce, 1887)
- Olceclostera indentata Schaus, 1910
- Olceclostera sp.

==== Saturniidae ====
===== Oxyteninae =====
- Oxytenis beprea Druce, 1886
- Oxytenis modestia (Cramer, [1780])

===== Arsenurinae =====
- Arsenura armida (Cramer, 1779)
- Arsenura batesii (Felder & Rogenhofer, 1874)
- Caio championi (Druce, 1886)
- Copiopteryx semiramis banghaasi Draudt 1930
- Dysdaemonia boreas (Cramer, [1775])
- Rhescyntis hippodamia (Cramer, 1777)
- Titaea tamerlan nobilis (Schaus, 1912)
- Titaea sp. nr tamerlan (Maasen, 1869)

===== Ceratocampinae =====
- Adeloneivaia boisduvalii (Doûmet, 1859)
- Adeloneivaia jason (Boisduval, 1872)
- Adeloneivaia subangulata (Herrich-Schäffer, [1855])
- Adelowalkeria caeca Lemaire, 1969
- Citheronia bellavista Draudt, 1930
- Citheronia lobesis Rothschild, 1907
- Citheronoides collaris (Rothschild, 1907)
- Citioica anthonilis (Herrich-Schäffer, [1854])
- Eacles imperialis (Drury, 1773)
- Eacles imperialis decoris Rothschild, 1907
- Eacles masoni Schaus, 1896
- Eacles ormondei Schaus, 1889
- Othorene purpurascens (Schaus, 1905)
- Othorene verana (Schaus, 1900)
- Schausiella santarosensis Lemaire, 1982
- Syssphinx colla Dyar, 1907
- Syssphinx mexicana (Boisduval, 1872)
- Syssphinx molina (Cramer 1780)
- Syssphinx montana (Packard, 1905)
- Syssphinx quadrilineata (Grote & Robinson, 1867)
- Syssphinx sp.

===== Hemileucinae =====
- Automeris banus (Boisduval, 1875)
- Automeris belti Druce 1886
- Automeris excreta Draudt, 1929
- Automeris hamata Schaus, 1906
- Automeris jucunda (Cramer, 1779)
- Automeris lauta Johnson & Michener, 1948
- Automeris metzli (Sallé, 1853)
- Automeris moloneyi Druce, 1897
- Automeris pallidior Draudt, 1929
- Automeris phrynon Druce, 1897
- Automeris postalbida Schaus, 1900
- Automeris rubrescens (Walker, 1855)
- Automeris tridens (Herrich-Schäffer, 1855)
- Automeris zozine Druce, 1886
- Dirphia avia (Stoll, 1780)
- Dirphiopsis flora (Schaus, 1911)
- Gamelia abas (Cramer, 1775)
- Gamelia septentrionalis Bouvier, 1936
- Hylesia continua (Walker, 1865)
- Hylesia gamelioides Michener, 1952
- Hylesia lineata Druce, 1886
- Hylesia rosacea rosacea Schaus, 1911,
- Hylesia rubrifrons Schaus, 1911
- Hylesia tinturex Schaus, 1921
- Hylesia umbratula Dyar, 1927
- Hyperchira nausica (Cramer, 1779)
- Leucanella acutissima Walker, 1865
- Leucanella contempta Lemaire, 1967
- Lonomia electra Druce 1886
- Molippa nibasa (Maassen & Weyding, 1885)
- Paradirphia boudinoti Lemaire & Wolfe, 1990
- Paradirphia rectilineata Wolfe, 1994
- Paradirphia semirosea (Walker 1855)
- Periphoba arcaei E. D. Jones, 1908
- Pseudodirphia menander (Druce, 1886)
- Pseudodirphia regia (Draudt, 1930)

===== Saturniinae =====
- Antheraea godmani (Druce 1892)
- Copaxa escalantei Lemaire, 1971
- Copaxa cydippe (Druce, 1894)
- Copaxa evelynae Wolfe & Lemaire (1993)
- Copaxa lavendera (Westwood, 1853)
- Copaxa mazaorum Lemaire, 1982
- Copaxa multifenestrata (Herrich-Schäffer, 1858)
- Copaxa rufinans Schaus, 1906
- Copaxa curvilinea Schaus, 1912
- Copaxa sophronia Schaus, 1921
- Eupackardia calleta (Westwood, 1853)
- Rothschildia erycina mexicana Draudt, 1929
- Rothschildia lebeau (Guérin-Méneville 1868)
- Rothschildia orizaba (Westwood, 1853)
- Rothschildia roxana Schaus, 1905

==== Sphingidae ====
===== Macroglossinae =====
- Aellopos ceculus (Cramer, 1777)
- Aellopos clavipes Rothschild & Jordan, 1903
- Aellopos titan (Cramer, 1777)
- Aleuron chloroptera (Perty, 1833)
- Aleuron neglectum Rothschild & Jordan, 1903
- Callionima denticulata (Schaus, 1895),
- Callionima falcifera (Gehlen, 1943)
- Callionima nomius (Walker, 1856),
- Callionima pan (Cramer, 1779)
- Callionima parce (Fabricius, 1775)
- Cautethia spuria (Boisduval, 1875)
- Cautethia yucatana Clark, 1919
- Enyo gorgon (Cramer, 1777)
- Enyo lugubris lugubris (Linnaeus, 1771)
- Enyo ocypete (Linnaeus, 1758)
- Enyo taedium Schaus, 1890 PBL
- Erinnyis alope (Drury, 1773)
- Erinnyis crameri (Schaus, 1898)
- Erinnyis ello ello (Linnaeus, 1758)
- Erinnyis lassauxii (Boisduval, 1859)
- Erinnyis obscura (Fabricius, 1775)
- Erinnyis oenotrus (Cramer, 1780)
- Erinnyis yucatana (Druce, 1888)
- Eumorpha achemon Drury, 1773
- Eumorpha anchemolus (Cramer, 1779)
- Eumorpha capronnieri (Boisduval, 1875)
- Eumorpha fasciatus (Sulzer, 1776)
- Eumorpha labruscae (Linnaeus, 1758)
- Eumorpha obliquus obliquus (Rothschild & Jordan, 1903)
- Eumorpha phorbas (Cramer, 1775)
- Eumorpha satellitia licaon (Cramer, 1775)
- Eumorpha triangulum (Rothschild & Jordan, 1903)
- Eumorpha typhon (Klug, 1836)
- Eumorpha vitis vitis (Linnaeus, 1748)
- Hemeroplanes ornatus Rothschild, 1894
- Hemeroplanes triptolemus (Cramer, 1779)
- Hyles lineata lineata (Fabricius., 1775)
- Isognathus rimosa (Grote, 1865)
- Isognathus scyron (Cramer, 1780)
- Madoryx oiclus (Cramer, 1779)
- Madoryx plutonius (Hübner, 1819)
- Nyceryx coffaeae (Walker, 1856)
- Nyceryx eximia (Rothschild & Jordan, 1916)
- Nyceryx riscus (Schaus, 1890)
- Nyceryx tacita (Druce, 1888)
- Pachylia darceta Druce, 1881
- Pachylia ficus (Linnaeus, 1758)
- Pachylia syces syces (Hübner, 1819)
- Pachylioides resumens (Walker, 1856)
- Perigonia jamaicensis Rothschild, 1894
- Perigonia lusca (Fabricius, 1777)
- Perigonia pallida Rothschild & Jordan, 1903,
- Perigonia stulta Herrich-Schäffer, 1854
- Phryxus caicus (Cramer, 1777)
- Pseudosphinx tetrio (Linnaeus, 1771)
- Stolidoptera tachasara (Druce, 1888)
- Unzela japix japix (Cramer, 1776)
- Xylophanes acrus Rothschild & Jordan, 1910
- Xylophanes amadis cyrene (Druce, 1881)
- Xylophanes anubus (Cramer, 1777)
- Xylophanes belti (Druce, 1878)
- Xylophanes ceratomioides Grote & Robinson, 1867
- Xylophanes chiron nechus (Cramer, 1777)
- Xylophanes cyrene (Druce, 1881)
- Xylophanes damocrita (Druce, 1894)
- Xylophanes eumedon (Boisduval, 1875)
- Xylophanes falco (Walker, 1856)
- Xylophanes germen germen (Schaus, 1890)
- Xylophanes hannemanni Closs, 1917
- Xylophanes juanita Rothschild & Jordan, 1903
- Xylophanes libya (Druce, 1878)
- Xylophanes loelia (Druce, 1878)
- Xylophanes neoptolemus (Stoll, 1780)
- Xylophanes pistacina Boisduval, 1875
- Xylophanes pluto (Fabricius, 1777)
- Xylophanes porcus continentalis Rothschild & Jordan, 1903
- Xylophanes pyrrhus (Rothschild & Jordan, 1906)
- Xylophanes tersa (Linnaeus, 1771)
- Xylophanes thyelia (Linnaeus, 1758)
- Xylophanes titana (Druce, 1878)
- Xylophanes turbata (H. Edwards, 1887)
- Xylophanes tyndarus tyndarus (Boisduval, 1875)
- Xylophanes undata Rothschild & Jordan, 1903
- Xylophanes zurcheri (Druce, 1894)

===== Smerinthinae =====
- Adhemarius dariensis (Rothschild & Jordan, 1903)
- Adhemarius donysa (Druce, 1889)
- Adhemarius gannascus gannascus (Stoll, 1790)
- Adhemarius ypsilon (Rothschild & Jordan, 1903)
- Protambulyx strigilis (Linnaeus, 1771)

===== Sphinginae =====
- Agrius cingulata (Fabricius, 1775)
- Amphimoea walkeri (Boisduval, 1875)
- Cocytius antaeus (Drury, 1773)
- Cocytius duponchel (Poey, 1832)
- Cocytius lucifer Rothschild & Jordan, 1903
- Manduca albiplaga (Walker, 1856)
- Manduca corallina (Druce, 1883)
- Manduca extrema (Gehlen, 1926)
- Manduca florestan (Stoll, 1782)
- Manduca incisa (Walker, 1856)
- Manduca lanuginosa (H. Edwards, 1887)
- Manduca lefeburii (Guèrin-Mèneville, 1844)
- Manduca muscosa (Rothschild & Jordan, 1903)
- Manduca occulta (Rothschild & Jordan, 1903)
- Manduca ochus (Klug, 1836)
- Manduca pellenia (Herrich-Schäffer, 1854)
- Manduca rustica rustica (Fabricius, 1775)
- Manduca sexta (Linnaeus, 1763)
- Manduca wellingi Brou, 1984
- Neococytius cluentius (Cramer, 1775)
- Sphinx leucophaeata Clemens, 1859
- Sphinx merops (Linnaeus, 1758)
- Sphinx praelongus (Rothschild & Jordan, 1903)

=== Hedyloidea ===
==== Hedylidae ====
- Macrosoma bahiata (Felder & Rogenhofer, 1875)
- Macrosoma cascaria (Schaus, 1901)
- Macrosoma conifera (Warren, 1897)
- Macrosoma hyacinthina (Warren, 1905)
- Macrosoma lucivittata (Walker,1863)
- Macrosoma rubedinaria (Walker, 1862)
- Macrosoma semiermis (Prout, 1932)

=== Geometroidea ===
==== Sematuridae ====
- Coronidia canace (Hopffer, 1856)
- Mania lunus (Linnaeus, 1758)

==== Uraniidae ====
===== Uraniinae =====
- Urania fulgens (Walker, 1854)

===== Epipleminae =====
- Aniplecta sp.
- Epiplema sp.
- Philagraula slossoniae Hulst, 1896

==== Geometridae ====
===== Oenochrominae =====
- Ametris nitocris (Cramer, 1780)
- Ergavia carinenta (Cramer, 1777)
- Ergavia merops (Cramer, 1775)
- Macrotes commatica Prout, 1916

===== Geometrinae =====
- Chlorochlamys sp.
- Chloropteryx dealbata (Warren, 1909)
- Chloropteryx diluta (Dognin, 1911)
- Chloropteryx opalaria (Guenée, 1858)
- Chloropteryx sp.
- Dichorda consequaria (H. Edwards, 1884)
- Lissochlora magnostigma (Dyar, 1912)
- Neagathia corruptata (Felder & Rogenhofer, 1875)
- Nemoria aturia (Druce, 1892)
- Nemoria punctilinea (Dognin, 1902)
- Nemoria scriptaria (Hübner, 1823)
- Nemoria venezuelae (Prout, 1932)
- Nemoria nr. karlae Pitkin, 1993
- Nemoria nr. parcipunta (Dognin, 1908)
- Nemoria nr. priscillae Pitkin, 1993
- Oospila concinna Warren, 1900
- Oospila rosipara Warren, 1897
- Oospila venezuelata (Walker, 1861)
- Phrudocentra janeira (Schaus, 1897)
- Phrudocentra pupillata Warren, 1897
- Pyrochlora rhanis (Cramer, 1777)
- Rhodochlora brunneipalpis Warren, 1894
- Synchlora expulsata (Walker, 1861)
- Synchlora gerularia (Hübner, [1823])
- Synchlora pulchrifimbria Warren, 1907
- Synchlora venustula (Dognin, 1910)
- Tachyphyle sp. nr. acuta Butler, 1881
- Xerochlora sp. nr. masonaria (Schaus, 1897)

===== Sterrhiinae =====
- Cyclophora anablemma (Prout, 1938)
- Dithecodes distracta (Walker, 1861)
- Dithecodes sp.
- Haemalea imitans (Dognin, 1900)
- Idaea complexaria (Schaus, 1901)
- Idaea contractalis (Walker, 1866)
- Idaea helleria (Schaus, 1913)
- Idaea latiferaria Walker, 1861
- Idaea spernata (Walker, 1861)
- Idaea subfervens (Prout, 1920)
- Idaea tacturata (Walker, 1861)
- Idaea sp.
- Idaea sp. nr. elegentaria (Herrich-Schäffer, 1854)
- Idaea sp. nr. pervertipennis (Hulst, 1900)
- Leptostales crossii (Hulst, 1900)
- Leptostales sp.
- Lobocleta figurinata (Guenée, 1858)
- Pleuroprucha sp. nr. ochrea (Warren, 1897)
- Scopula apparitaria (Walker, 1861)
- Scopula confertaria (Walker, 1861)
- Scopula privata (Walker, 1861)
- Scopula subquadrata (Guenée, 1858)
- Scopula suffundaria (Walker, 1861)
- Scopula umbilicata (Fabricius, 1794)
- Scopula sp.
- Semaeopus caecaria (Hübner, 1825)
- Semaeopus deflexa (Warren, 1900)
- Semaeopus varia (Warren, 1895)
- Semaeopus sp.
- Smicropus intercepta (Walker, 1854)
- Smicropus laeta (Walker, [1865])
- Tricentra quadrigata (Felder, 1875)
- Tricentra sp. 1-2
- Tricentra sp. nr. fulvifera Dognin, 1908
- Tricentrogyna violescens (Schaus, 1901)x
- Tricentrogyna sp. 1-2
- Tricentrogyna sp. nr. deportata (Walker, 1861)
- Trygodes musivaria (Herrich-Schäffer, 1855)

===== Larentiinae =====
- Disclisioprocta stellata (Guenée, 1858)
- Eois catana Druce, 1892
- Eois expressaria (Walker, 1861)
- Eois heliadaria (Guenée, 1858)
- Eois insignata (Walker, 1861)
- Eois sp. 1-4
- Eois sp. nr. binaria (Guenée [1858])
- Eois sp. nr. dorisaria (Schaus, 1913)
- Eubaphe conformis (Walker, 1854)
- Eubaphe sp.
- Eudulophasia invaria (Walker, 1854)
- Euphyia cinerascens (Dognin, 1900)
- Euphyia sp.
- Eupithecia spilosata (Walker, 1863)
- Eupithecia sp. 1-2
- Eutrepsia dispar (Walker, 1854)
- Obila floccosaria (Walker, 1866)
- Obila pannosata (Guenée, 1858)
- Obila sp.
- Oligopluera aulaeata Felder & Rogenhofer, 1875
- Oligopluera malachitaria Herrich-Schäffer, 1855
- Psaliodes sp.
- Rheumaptera sp.

===== Ennominae =====
- Cimicodes albicosta Dognin, 1913
- Cyclomia disparlis Schaus, 1911
- Cyclomia minuta (Druce, 1892)
- Dyschoroneura obsolescens Warren, 1894
- Epimecis detexta (Walker, 1860)
- Epimecis fraternaria (Guenée, 1858)
- Epimecis matronaria (Guenée, 1858)
- Epimecis patronaria (Walker, 1860)
- Epimecis subroraria Walker, 1860
- Epimecis sp.
- Erastria decrepitaria (Hübner, 1823)
- Euclysia dentifasciata Dognin, 1910
- Euclysia sp.
- Eusarca asteria (Druce, 1892)
- Eusarca minucia (Druce, 1892)
- Eusarca nemoria (Druce, 1892)
- Glena agria Rindge, 1967
- Herbita lilacina (Warren, 1897)
- Hymenomima camerata Warren, 1900
- Hymenomima sp. 1-2
- Iridopsis herse (Schaus, 1912)
- Iridopsis oberthuri Prout, 1932
- Iridopsis pandarosos (Schaus, 1912)
- Iridopsis validaria (Guenée, 1858)
- Iridopsis nr. aviceps Prout, 1932
- Leuciris fimbriaria (Stoll, [1781])
- Leucula abilinearia Guenée, 1858
- Macaria aequiferaria Walker, 1861
- Macaria gambarina (Stoll, [1781])
- Macaria regulata (Fabricius, 1775)
- Macaria subfulva (Warren, 1906)
- Macaria sp. 1-3
- Macaria sp. nr. ferina (Dognin, 1924)
- Macaria sp. nr. guapilaris (Schaus, 1911)
- Macaria sp. nr. lydia (Scahus, 1912)
- Melanchroia chephise (Stoll, 1782)
- Melanolophia flexilinea (Warren, 1906)
- Melanolophia sadrina (Schaus, 1901)
- Melanolophia sp.
- Microgonia rufaria Warren, 1901
- Nematocampa completa Warren, 1904
- Nematocampa sp.
- Nepheloleuca floridata (Grote, 1883)
- Nepheloleuca politia (Cramer, 1777)
- Opisthoxia bella (Butler, 1881)
- Opisthoxia uncinata (Schaus, 1912)
- Opisthoxia sp. nr. cluana (Druce, 1900)
- Oxydia apidania (Cramer, 1779)
- Oxydia vesulia (Cramer, 1779)
- Pantherodes pardalaria Hübner, 1823
- Pantherodes sp.
- Paragonia cruraria (Herrich- Schäffer, 1854)
- Parilexia cermala (Druce, 1893)
- Patalene aenetusaria (Walker, 1860)
- Patalene hamulata (Guenée, 1858)
- Patalene luciata (Stoll, 1790)
- Patalene trogonaria (Herrich-Schäffer, 1856)
- Patalene nr. asychisaria (Walker, 1860)
- Patalene sp.
- Periclina syctaria (Walker, 1860)
- Perigramma repitita Warren, 1905
- Perigramma sp. nr. guatemalaria Schaus, 1927
- Pero afuera Poole, 1987
- Pero astapa (Druce, 1892)
- Pero aurunca (Druce, 1892)
- Pero clysiaria (Felder & Rogenhofer, 1875)
- Pero coronata Warren, 1904
- Pero delauta (Warren, 1907)
- Pero dularia Poole, 1987
- Pero fragila Poole, 1987
- Pero fusaria (Walker, 1860)
- Pero incisa Dognin, 1889
- Pero lessema (Schaus, 1901)
- Pero melissa (Druce, 1892)
- Pero polygonaria (Herrich-Schäffer, 1855)
- Pero probata Poole, 1987
- Pero pumaria Felder & Rogenhofer, 1875
- Pero saturata (Walker, 1868)
- Pero spina Poole, 1897
- Pero verda Poole, 1987
- Pero sp. nr. anceta (Stoll, 1781)
- Phrygionis divitaria (Oberthür, 1916)
- Phrygionis pallicosta (Felder & Rogenhofer, 1875)
- Phrygionis polita (Cramer, 1780)
- Phrygionis privignaria (Guenée [1858])
- Phyle schausaria (H. Edwards, 1884)
- Physocleora sp.
- Pityeja histrionaria (Herrich-Schäffer, 1853)
- Polla celeraria (Walker, 1860)
- Prochoerodes striata (Stoll, 1798)
- Prochoerodes sp.
- Psamatodes abydata (Guenée, [1858])
- Pyrinia itunaria Walker, 1860
- Pyrinia sanitaria Schaus 1901
- Pyrinia sp.
- Semiothisa carinaria Dognin, 1924
- Semiothisa divergentata (Snellen, 1894)
- Sericoptera mahometaria (Herrich-Schäffer, 1856)
- Simena luctifera (Walker, 1856)
- Sphacelodes vulneraria (Hübner, 1823)
- Synnomos firmamentaria Guenée, 1858
- Thysanopyga amarantha Debauche, 1937
- Thysanopyga apitruncaria Herrich-Schäffer, 1856
- Thysanopyga carfinia (Druce, 1893)
- Thysanopyga pygaria (Guenée, 1858)
- Tornos pusillus Rindge, 1954
- Trotopera arrhapa (Druce, 1891)

=== Noctuoidea ===
==== Notodontidae ====
===== Notodontinae =====
- Cerura rarata Walker, 1865

===== Dudusinae =====
- Crinodes besckei (Hübner, 1824)
- Crinodes guatemalena Druce, 1887
- Crinodes schausi Rothschild, 1917
- Crinodes striolata Schaus, 1901

===== Hemiceratinae =====
- Apela neobule Druce, 1905
- Hemiceras alba Walker, 1865
- Hemiceras bilinea Schaus
- Hemiceras spp. 1–16

===== Heterocampinae =====
- Antaea omana Schaus, 1906
- Chilara cresus (Cramer, 1777)
- Colax phocus Schaus, 1892
- Colax sp.
- Contrebia extrema Walker, 1856
- Disphragis livida Schaus, 1911
- Disphragis remuria Druce, 1898
- Disphragis tharis (Stoll, [1780])
- Drugera morona Druce, 1898
- Farigia sp. nr. magniplaga Schaus, 1906
- Farigia sp.
- Hapigia annulata Schaus, 1905
- Hapigia repandens Schaus, 1906
- Hapigia simplex (Walker, 1865)
- Hapigia sp. 1-2
- Magava multilinea Walker, 1865
- Naprepa sp.
- Rhuda difficilis Schaus, 1911
- Rhuda tuisa Schaus, 1911
- Rifargia gelduba Schaus, 1892
- Rifargia sp. 1-3
- Rosema apicalis Walker, 1855
- Rosema epigena (Stoll, 1790)
- Rosema thestia Druce, 1898
- Sericochroa arecosa Druce, 1898
- Trichomaplata sp.

===== Nystaleinae =====
- Bardaxima meyeri Schaus, 1928
- Calledema argenta Schaus, 1905
- Calledema jocasta (Schaus, 1901)
- Didugua argentilinea Druce, 1891
- Didugua violascens Herrich-Schäffer
- Elasmia astuta Schaus, 1894
- Lepasta bractea (Felder, 1874)
- Lepasta grammodes Felder, 1874
- Marthula cynrica Schaus, 1928
- Notoplusia marchiana Schaus, 1928
- Nystalea clotho Thiaucourt, 2002
- Nystalea malga Schaus, 1904
- Nystalea superciliosa Guenée, 1852
- Nystalea unguicularis Thiaucourt, 2002
- Pentobesa maya Thiaucourt, 2008
- Pentobesa xylinoides (Walker, 1866)
- Strophocerus albonotatus Druce, 1909
- Symmerista meridionalis Thaiucourt, 2007

===== Dioptinae =====
- Brachyglene crocearia (Schaus), 1912
- Dioptis butes (Druce, 1885)
- Dioptis eteocles (Druce, 1885)
- Ephialtias pseudena (Boisduval, 1870)
- Getta turrenti Miller, 2009
- Isostyla ithomeina (Butler, 1872)
- Josia enoides (Boisduval, 1870)
- Josia frigida Druce, 1885
- Josia fusigera Walker, 1864
- Josia hyperia (Walker, 1854)
- Josia integra Walker, 1854
- Josia megaera (Fabricius, 1787)
- Josia sp.
- Lirimiris guatemalensis Rothschild, 1917
- Lirimiris lignitecta Walker, 1865
- Lirimiris meridionalis Schaus, 1904
- Lyces ariaca (Druce, 1885)
- Lyces tamara (Hering, 1925)
- Notodontidae (incertae sedis)
- Oricia truncata Walker, 1854
- Pentobesa lignicolor Möschler, 1877
- Phaeochlaena gyon (Fabricius, 1787)
- Phaeochlaena tendinosa Hübner, 1818
- Phanoptis cyanomelas C. Felder & R. Felder, 1874
- Scotura annulata (Guérin-Méneville), 1844

==== Erebidae ====
===== Lymantriinae =====
- Caviria sp.
- Eloria subnuda Walker, 1855
- Terphothrix tibialis (Walker, 1855)

===== Arctiinae =====
====== Lithosiini ======
- Agylla pogonoda Hampson, 1900
- Agylla spp. 1–4
- Apistosia judas Hübner, [1819]
- Ardonea morio Walker, 1854
- Areva trigemmis (Hübner, 1827)
- Balbura fasciata Schaus, 1911
- Balbura intervenata Schaus, 1911
- Balbura sp. nr. dorsisigna Walker, 1854
- Cisthene polyzona Druce, 1885
- Diarhabdosia laudamia (Druce, 1885)
- Epeiromulona roseata Field, 1952
- Eudesmia laetifera Walker, 1864
- Eudesmia menea (Drury, 1782)
- Eurylomia cordula (Boisduval, 1870)
- Euthyone grisescens (Schaus 1911)
- Euthyone simplex (Walker, 1854)
- Euthyone theodula (Schaus, 1924)
- Lycomorphodes sordida (Butler, 1877)
- Lycomorphodes sp.
- Metalobosia sp. nr. ducalis Schaus, 1911
- Mulona phelina (Druce, 1885)
- Talara synnephela Dyar, 1916
- Tuina cingulata (Walker, 1854)

====== Arctiini ======
Arctiina

- Arachnis aulaea Geyer, 1837
- Arachnis dilecta (Boisduval, 1870)
- Estigmene acrea (Drury, 1773)
- Hypercompe caudata (Walker, 1855)
- Hypercompe leucarctiodes (Grote & Robinson, 1967)
- Hypercompe perplexa Schaus, 1911
- Notarctia proxima (Guérin- Méneville, 1844)
- Virbia birchi (Druce, 1911)
- Virbia sp.

Callimorphina

- Utetheisa ornatrix (Linnaeus, 1758)

Pericopina

- Calodesma maculifrons (Walker, 1865)
- Chetone angulosa (Walker, 1854)
- Chetone histrio Boisduval, 1870
- Chetone ithomia (Boisduval, 1870)
- Composia fidelissima Herrich-Schäffer, 1866
- Dysschema aorsa (Boisduval, 1870)
- Dysschema cerealis (Druce, 1884)
- Dysschema leucophaea (Walker, 1854)
- Dysschema lycaste (Klug, 1836)
- Dysschema magdala (Boisduval, 1870)
- Dysschema mariamne (Geyer, 1836)
- Dysschema sp.
- Heliactinidia sitia Schaus, 1910
- Hyalurga sora (Boisduval, 1870)
- Hyalurga urioides Schaus, 1910
- Hypocrita albimaculata (Druce, 1897)
- Hypocrita ambigua (Hering, 1925)
- Hypocrita arcaei (Druce, 1884)
- Hypocrita excellens (Walker, 1854)
- Hypocrita pylotis (Drury, 1773)
- Xenosoma flaviceps (Walker, 1865)

Phaegopterina

- Amaxia apyga Hampson, 1901
- Amaxia beata (Dognin, 1909)
- Amaxia pardalis Walker, 1855
- Amaxia sp.
- Anaxita decorata Walker, 1855
- Anaxita drucei Rodriguez 1893
- Belemnia inaurata Sulzer, 1776
- Castrica phalaenoides (Drury, 1773)
- Cissura plumbea Hampson, 1901
- Cratoplastis diluta Felder, 1874
- Elysius conspersus Walker, 1855
- Euchaetes antica (Walker, 1856)
- Evius hippia (Stoll, [1790])
- Gorgonidia buckleyi Druce, 1883
- Halysidota excellens Walker
- Halysidota grandis (Rothschild, 1909)
- Halysidota pectenella Watson, 1980
- Idalus alteria Schaus, 1905
- Idalus crinis Druce, 1884
- Idalus dares Druce, 1894
- Idalus herois Schaus, 1889
- Idalus vitrea (Cramer, 1780)
- Lophocampa alternata (Grote, 1867)
- Lophocampa annulata Walker
- Lophocampa catenulata (Hübner, [1812])
- Lophocampa citrina (Sepp, [1843])
- Lophocampa seruba (Herrich-Schäffer, [1855])
- Melese amastris (Druce, 1884)
- Melese asana (Druce, 1884)
- Melese flavimaculata Dognin, 1899
- Munona iridescens Schaus, 1894
- Neritos samos Druce, 1896
- Ormetica ataenia (Schaus, 1910)
- Ormetica goloma (Schaus, 1920)
- Ormetica guapisa (Schaus, 1910)
- Ormetica orbona (Schaus, 1889)
- Ormetica sicilia Druce, 1884
- Ormetica taeniata (Guérin-Méneville, [1844])
- Parathyris cedonulli (Stoll, 1781)
- Pareuchaetes insulata (Walker, 1855)
- Parevia gurma Schaus, 1920
- Pelochyta misera Schaus, 1911
- Phaeomolis lineatus Druce, 1884
- Pseudohemihyalea fallaciosa (Toulgoët, 1997)
- Pseudohemihyalea labeculoides Toulgoët, 1995
- Pseudohemihyalea porioni Toulgoët, 1995
- Rhipha chionoplaga (Dognin, 1913)
- Rhipha persimilis (Rothschild, 1909)
- Robinsonia deiopea Druce, 1895
- Robinsonia sabata Druce, 1895
- Selenarctia elissa (Schaus, 1892)
- Symphlebia lophocampoides Felder, 1874
- Symphlebia underwoodi (Rothschild, 1910)
- Trichromia atta (Schaus, 1920)
- Trichromia flavoroseus (Walker, 1855)
- Trichromia sp.
- Trichromia sp. nr. cotes (Druce, 1896)
- Viviennea tegyra (Druce, 1896)

Euchromiina

- Chrysocale principalis (Walker, [1865])
- Cosmosoma achemon (Fabricius, 1781)
- Cosmosoma braconoides (Walker, 1854)
- Cosmosoma cingulatum Butler, 1876
- Cosmosoma festiva Walker, 1854
- Cosmosoma hercyna (Druce, 1884)
- Cosmosoma intensa (Walker, 1854)
- Cosmosoma ruatana (Druce, 1888)
- Cosmosoma sectinota Hampson, 1898
- Cosmosoma stilbosticta (Butler, 1876)
- Cosmosoma sp. nr. teuthras (Walker, 1854)
- Dycladia basimacula Schaus, 1924
- Dycladia vitrina Rothschild, 1911
- Eunomia colombina (Fabricius, 1793)
- Eunomia latenigra (Butler, 1876)
- Gymnelia sp. nr. nobilis Schaus, 1911
- Homoeocera gigantea (Druce, 1884)
- Horama oedippus (Boisduval, 1870)
- Horama panthalon (Fabricius, 1793)
- Horama plumipes (Drury, 1773)
- Loxophlebia geminata Schaus, 1905
- Loxophlebia masa (Druce, 1889)
- Macrocneme adonis Druce, 1884
- Macrocneme auripes (Walker, 1854)
- Macrocneme cabimensis Dyar, 1914
- Macrocneme chrysitis (Guérin-Méneville, 1844)
- Macrocneme iole Druce, 1884
- Macrocneme lades (Cramer, [1776])
- Mesothen pyrrha (Schaus, 1889)
- Myrmecopsis strigosa (Druce, 1884)
- Pheia albisigna (Walker, 1854)
- Phoenicoprocta sp. sanguinea (Walker, 1854)
- Poliopastea sp.
- Pseudomya melanthoides Schaus, 1920
- Psoloptera basifulva Schaus, 1894
- Saurita fumosa (Schaus, 1912)
- Saurita myrrha Druce, 1884
- Saurita temenus (Stoll, [1781])
- Saurita tipulina (Hübner, 1827)
- Sphecosoma felderi (Druce, 1883)
- Syntomeida melanthus (Cramer, [1779])
- Xanthyda xanthosticta (Hampson, 1898)

Ctenuchina

- Aclytia albistriga Schaus, 1910
- Aclytia heber (Cramer, 1780)
- Aclytia punctata Butler, 1876
- Aclytia reducta Rothschild, 1912
- Aclytia sp.
- Agyrta dux Walker, 1854
- Antichloris caca Hübner, 1818
- Antichloris viridis Druce, 1884
- Chlorostola interrupta Walker
- Chrysostola augusta (Druce, 1884)
- Chrysostola moza (Druce, 1896)
- Correbidia costinotata Schaus, 1911
- Correbidia elegans (Druce, 1884)
- Correbidia germana Rothschild, 1912
- Correbidia undulata (Druce, 1884)
- Ctenucha ruficeps Walker, 1854
- Ctenucha venosa Walker, 1854
- Cyanopepla arrogans (Walker, 1854)
- Cyanopepla jalifa (Boisduval, 1870)
- Delphyre hebes Walker, 1854
- Delphyre testacea (Druce, 1884)
- Desmotricha perplexa (Rothschild, 1912)
- Dinia aeagrus (Cramer, [1779])
- Ecdemus obscurata Schaus, 1911
- Episcepsis inornata (Walker, 1856)
- Episcepsis lenaeus Cramer, 1870
- Episcepsis thetis Linnaeus 1771
- Episcepsis venata Butler, 1877
- Eriphioides tractipennis (Butler, 1876)
- Eucereon aroa Schaus, 1894
- Eucereon atriguttum Druce, 1905
- Eucereon aurantiaca (Rothschild, 1909)
- Eucereon balium Hampson, 1898
- Eucereon latifascia Walker, 1856
- Eucereon maja Druce, 1884
- Eucereon obscurum Möschler, 1872
- Eucereon pilatii Walker, 1854
- Eucereon pseudarchias Hampson, 1898
- Eucereon rosa (Walker, 1854)
- Eucereon rosadora Dyar, 1910
- Eucereon varium (Walker, 1854)
- Heliura rhodophila (Walker, 1856)
- Heliura tetragramma (Walker, 1854)
- Hyaleucerea gigantea (Druce, 1884)
- Hyaleucerea vulnerata Butler, 1875
- Mydromera notochloris (Boisduval, 1870)
- Napata leucotelus Butler, 1876
- Napata walkeri (Druce, 1889)
- Neacerea rufiventris Schaus, 1894
- Ptychotrichos episcepsidis Dyar, 1914
- Trichura coarctata (Drury, 1773)
- Trichura druryi Hübner, [1819]
- Trichura esmeralda (Walker, 1854)

==== Herminiinae ====
- Bleptina hydrillalis Guenée, 1854
- Macrochilo andaca (Druce, 1891)
- Lascoria sp.
- Macrochilo sp.
- Palthis orasiusalis Walker, 1859
- Palthis sp. nr. bizialis (Walker, 1859)

==== Hypeninae ====
- Cecharismena darconis (Schaus, 1913)
- Hypena perialis Schaus, 1904
- Hypena porrectalis Fabricius, 1794
- Hypena subidalis Guenée, 1854
- Hypena sp.
- Isogona natatrix Guenée, 1852
- Phytometra flacillalis (Walker, 1859)
- Radara aquilalis Schaus, 1916
- Radara nealcesalis (Walker, 1859)
- Radara nezeila (Schaus, 1906)
- Radara zoum (Dyar, 1914)
- Radara sp.
- Trauaxa obliqualis Walker, 1866

==== Anobinae ====
- Anoba pohli (Felder & Rogenhofer, 1874)
- Baniana ostia Druce, 1898
- Baniana suggesta (Walker, 1858)
- Baniana ypita Schaus, 1901

==== Erebinae ====
===== Thermesiini =====
- Ascalapha odorata (Linnaeus, 1758)
- Hemeroblemma acron (Cramer, 1779)
- Hemeroblemma dolosa Hübner, [1823]
- Hemeroblemma mexicana (Guenée, 1852)
- Hemeroblemma opigena (Drury, 1773)
- Hemeroblemma sp.
- Letis buteo Guenée, 1852
- Letis herilia (Stoll, 1780)
- Letis mycerina (Cramer, 1777)
- Thermesia sobria Walker, 1865
- Thysania agrippina (Cramer, 1776)

===== Catocalini =====
- Argidia sp. nr. hypoxantha (Hampson, 1926)
- Hemicephalis agenoria (Druce, 1890)
- Hypogrammodes balma Guenée, 1852
- Ramphia albizona (Latreille, 1817)

===== Metipotini =====
- Melipotis descreta (Walker, [1858])
- Melipotis famelica (Guenée, 1852)
- Melipotis fasciolaris (Hübner, 1825)
- Melipotis nigrobasis (Guenée, 1852)
- Melipotis perpendicularis (Guenée, 1852)
- Melipotis sp.
- Orodesma schausi (Druce, 1890)

===== Euclidiini =====
- Celiptera sp.
- Mocis diffluens (Guenée, 1852)
- Mocis disseverans Walker, 1858
- Mocis dyndima (Stoll, 1782)
- Mocis latipes (Guenée, 1852)
- Mocis marcida (Guenée, 1852)
- Mocis texana (Morrison, 1875)
- Ptichodis bistrigata Hübner, 1818

===== Poaphilini =====
- Dysgonia expediens (Walker, 1858)
- Dysgonia purpurata Kaye, 1901

===== Ophiusini =====
- Achaea lienardi Boisduval, 1833
- Amolita sp. 1-2
- Coenipeta bibitrix (Hübner, 1823)
- Coenipeta damonia (Stoll, 1782)
- Coenipeta hemiplagia Felder & Rogenhofer, 1874
- Coenipeta phasis Cramer, 1977
- Coenipeta tanais (Cramer,1776)
- Coenipeta sp. nr. medalba Schaus 1906
- Epidromia pannosa Guenée, 1852
- Epidromia tinctifera (Walker, 1858)
- Euclystis insana (Guenée, 1852)
- Euclystis plusiodes (Walker, 1858)
- Helia argentipes (Walker, 1869)
- Helia celita (Schaus, 1912)
- Homoptera brevipennis Walker, 1869
- Itomia lignaris Hübner, 1823
- Itomia multilinea Walker, 1858
- Itomia opistographa Guenée, 1852
- Kakopoda progenies (Guenée, 1852)
- Lesmone formularis (Geyer, 1837)
- Metria aperta (Walker, [1858])
- Metria endopolia (Dyar, 1917)
- Metria simplicior (Walker, [1858])
- Metria spp. 1–4
- Ophisma minna Guenée, 1852
- Ophisma tropicalis Guenée, 1852
- Selenisa sueroides (Guenée, 1852)
- Toxonprucha diffundens Walker, 1858

===== Unplaced Erebinae =====
- Calyptis semicuprea (Walker, 1857)
- Catephiodes trinidadensis (Kaye, 1901)
- Coenobela paucula (Walker, 1858)
- Nymbis iniqua Guenée, 1852
- Perasia helvina (Guenée, 1852)
- Ptichodes basilans (Guenée, 1852)

==== Eulepidotinae ====
===== Eulepidotini =====
- Eulepidotis addens (Walker, 1858)
- Eulepidotis alabastraria Hübner, 1823
- Eulepidotis electa Dyar, 1914
- Eulepidotis carcistola Hampson, 1926
- Eulepidotis hermura Schaus, 1898
- Eulepidotis inclyta Fabricius, 1997
- Eulepidotis juncida Guenée, 1852
- Eulepidotis modestula (Herrich-Schäffer, 1869)
- Eulepidotis perducens (Walker, 1858)
- Eulepidotis punctilinea Schaus, 1921
- Eulepidotis testaceiceps Felder, 1874
- Eulepidotis suppura Dyar, 1914
- Eulepidotis sp.
- Obrima pyraloides Walker, 1865

===== Panopodini =====
- Antiblemma amarga (Schaus, 1911)
- Antiblemma hamilcar (Schaus, 1914)
- Antiblemma imitans (Walker, 1858)
- Antiblemma incarnans Felder & Rogenhofer, 1874
- Antiblemma memoranda Schaus, 1911
- Antiblemma neptis (Cramer, 1779)
- Antiblemma rufinans Guenée, 1852
- Antiblemma sterope (Stoll, 1780)
- Antiblemma sufficiens (Walker, 1858)
- Antiblemma sp.
- Anticarsia anisospila (Walker, 1869)
- Anticarsia gemmatalis Hübner, 1818
- Athyrma adjutrix auth. not (Cramer, 1780)
- Azeta ceramina Hübner, [1821]
- Azeta rhodogaster Guenée, 1852
- Azeta signans Walker
- Epitausa atriplaga (Walker, 1858)
- Eulepidotinae (incertae sedis)
- Litoprosopus confligens (Walker, [1858])

==== Euteliidae ====
===== Euteliinae =====
- Eutelia auratrix Walker, 1858
- Eutelia sp.
- Paectes abrostoloides Guenée, 1852
- Paectes albescens Hampson, 1912
- Paectes fovifera Hampson, 1912
- Paectes fuscescens (Walker, 1855)
- Paectes glauca (Hampson, 1905)
- Paectes lunodes Guenée, 1852

==== Nolidae ====
- Iscadia argentea (Walker, 1869)
- Iscadia furcifera (Walker, 1869)
- Meganola leucostola (Hampson, 1900)
- Neostictoptera nigropuncta Druce, 1900
- Nola turbana Schaus, 1921

==== Noctuidae ====
===== Plusiinae =====
====== Argyrogrammatini ======
- Argyrogramma verruca (Fabricius, 1794)
- Chrysodeixis includens (Walker, [1858])
- Trichoplusia ni (Hübner, [1803])

====== Plusiini ======
- Autoplusia egena (Guenée, 1852)

===== Bagisarinae =====
- Amyna octo Guenée, 1852
- Bagisara patula (Druce, 1898)
- Bagisara repanda (Fabricius, 1793)

===== Cydosiinae =====
- Cydosia curvinella Guenée, 1879
- Cydosia phaedra Druce, 1897

===== Eustrotiinae =====
- Marimatha botyoides (Guenée, 1852)
- Marimatha sp.
- Tripudia furcula Pogue, 2009

===== Acontiinae =====
- Acidaliodes celenna Druce, 1892
- Acontia tetragona Walker, [1858]

===== Diphtherinae =====
- Diphthera festiva (Fabricius, 1775)

===== Acronictinae =====
- Antachara rotundata Walker, 1858
- Argyrosticta ditissima (Walker, [1858])
- Argyrosticta vauaurea (Hampson, 1908)

===== Amphipyrinae =====
- Cropia connecta (Smith, 1894)
- Cropia philia (Druce, 1889)
- Metaponpneumata rogenhoferi Möschler, 1890

===== Oncocnemidinae =====
- Neogalea sunia (Guenée, 1852)

===== Agaristinae =====
- Darceta falcata (Druce, 1883)
- Darceta proserpina (Stoll, [1782])
- Epithisanotia sanctijohannis Stephens, 1850
- Seirocastnia amalthea (Dalman, 1823)
- Vespola caerulifera (Walker, 1867)

===== Condicinae =====
====== Condicini ======
- Condica cupienta (Cramer, 1780)
- Condica imitata (Druce, 1891)
- Condica mimica (Hampson, 1908)
- Condica mobilis Walker, [1857]
- Condica subaurea (Guenée, 1852)
- Condica subornata (Walker, 1865)
- Condica sutor (Guenée, 1852)
- Condica sp. 1-2

====== Leuconyctini ======
- Diastema tigris Guenée, 1852
- Micrathetis dasarada (Druce, 1898)
- Micrathetis triplex (Walker, 1857)

===== Heliothinae =====
- Helicoverpa zea (Boddie, 1850)
- Heliothis virescens (Fabricius, 1777)

===== Eriopinae =====
- Callopistria floridensis (Guenée, 1852)
- Callopistria rivularis (Walker, [1858])

===== Noctuinae =====
====== Phosphilini ======
- Spodoptera albula (Walker, 1857)
- Spodoptera dolichos (Fabricius, 1794)
- Spodoptera eridania (Cramer, 1784)
- Spodoptera exigua (Hübner, [1808])
- Spodoptera frugiperda (J.E. Smith, 1797)
- Spodoptera latifascia (Walker, 1856)
- Spodoptera ornithogalli (Guenée, 1852)
- Spodoptera spp.

====== Elaphriini ======
- Elaphria agrotina (Guenée, 1852)
- Elaphria deltoides (Möschler, 1880)
- Elaphria sp. nr. perigeana (Schaus, 1911)
- Elaphria sp. 1-2
- Gonodes liquida (Möschler, 1886)

====== Dypterygiini ======
- Neophaenis respondens (Walker, 1858)

====== Xylenini ======
- Xylina subcostalis Walker, 1869

====== Hadenini ======
- Stauropides persimilis Hampson, 1909

====== Leucaniini ======
- Leucania inconspicua Herrich-Schäffer, 1868
- Leucania multilinea Walker, 1856
- Mythimna unipuncta (Haworth, 1809)

====== Noctuini ======
- Agrotis ipsilon (Hufnagel, 1766)
- Agrotis subterranea (Fabricius, 1794)
- Anicla infecta (Ochsenheimer, 1816)

===== Stictopterinae =====
- Nagara vitrea (Guenée, 1852)
