= Scopula subquadrata =

Scientific classification
- Kingdom: Animalia
- Phylum: Arthropoda
- Class: Insecta
- Order: Lepidoptera
- Family: Geometridae
- Genus: Scopula
- Species: S. subquadrata

Binomial name
- Scopula subquadrata (Guenée, [1858])

Synonyms
- Acidalia subquadrata Guenee, 1858; Acidalia tortuosaria Moschler, 1890

Species of geometer moth in subfamily Sterrhinae

Scopula subquadrata is a moth of the family Geometridae. It is found in the Neotropics, including Brazil, Jamaica, Puerto Rico and Honduras.
