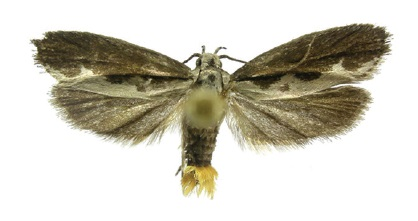

Scientific classification
- Domain: Eukaryota
- Kingdom: Animalia
- Phylum: Arthropoda
- Class: Insecta
- Order: Lepidoptera
- Family: Depressariidae
- Genus: Ethmia
- Species: E. similatella

Binomial name
- Ethmia similatella Busck, 1920

= Ethmia similatella =

Species of moth

Ethmia similatella is a moth in the family Depressariidae. It is found from western Mexico (Sinaloa) to Honduras, Guatemala and Costa Rica.

The length of the forewings is 6.7–10.2 mm (0.26–0.40 in). The color pattern similar to Ethmia penthica, but the longitudinal line dividing the brown and whitish areas is less sinuate (wavy) so that the lobes of brown into white and the intervening white projections are less regularly U-shaped. The ground color of the hindwings is dark brown. Adults are on wing in February, April and August in Guatemala and July and August elsewhere. There are probably multiple generations per year.

The larvae feed on Varronia guanacastensis.
