= Syllepte dioptalis =

Scientific classification
- Kingdom: Animalia
- Phylum: Arthropoda
- Class: Insecta
- Order: Lepidoptera
- Family: Crambidae
- Genus: Syllepte
- Species: S. dioptalis

Binomial name
- Syllepte dioptalis (Walker, 1866)

Synonyms
- Erilusa dioptalis Walker, 1866; Erilusa pseudauxo C. Felder, R. Felder & Rogenhofer, 1875; Halesidota secta Walker, [1865] (preocc.)

Species of moth

Syllepte dioptalis is a moth in the family Crambidae. It is found in Honduras and Brazil (Ega, Amazonas).

Adults are bright metallic blue, the wings black with azure and purple reflections. The forewings have two white, nearly hyaline broad streaks in the disc. The hindwings have a broad white, nearly hyaline, stripe in the disc.
