= Eupithecia spilosata =

Scientific classification
- Kingdom: Animalia
- Phylum: Arthropoda
- Class: Insecta
- Order: Lepidoptera
- Family: Geometridae
- Genus: Eupithecia
- Species: E. spilosata

Binomial name
- Eupithecia spilosata Walker, 1863

Synonyms
- Tephroclystia hispida Bastelberger, 1908

Species of moth

Eupithecia spilosata is a moth in the family Geometridae. It is found in Honduras and Bolivia.
