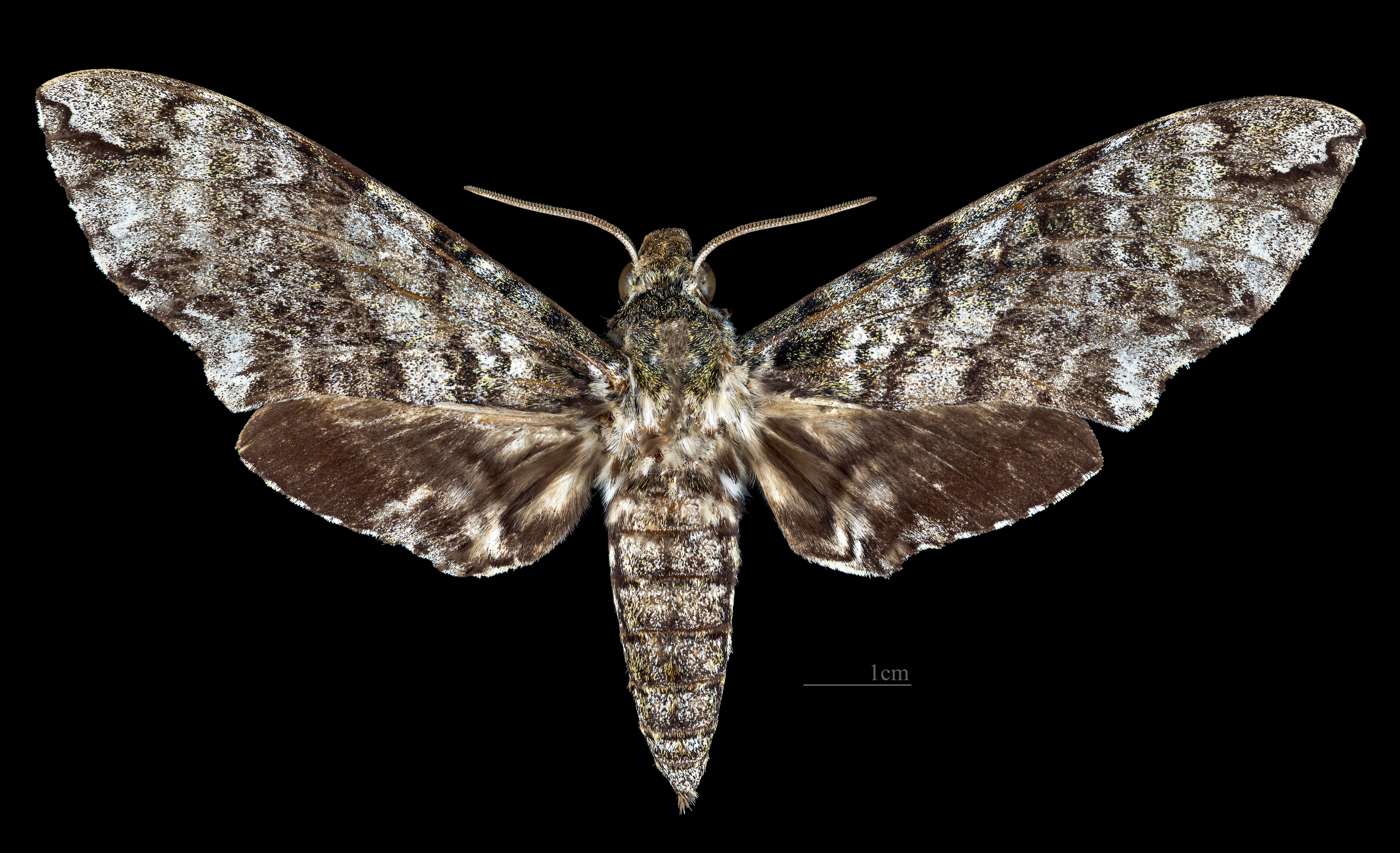
- Male dorsal
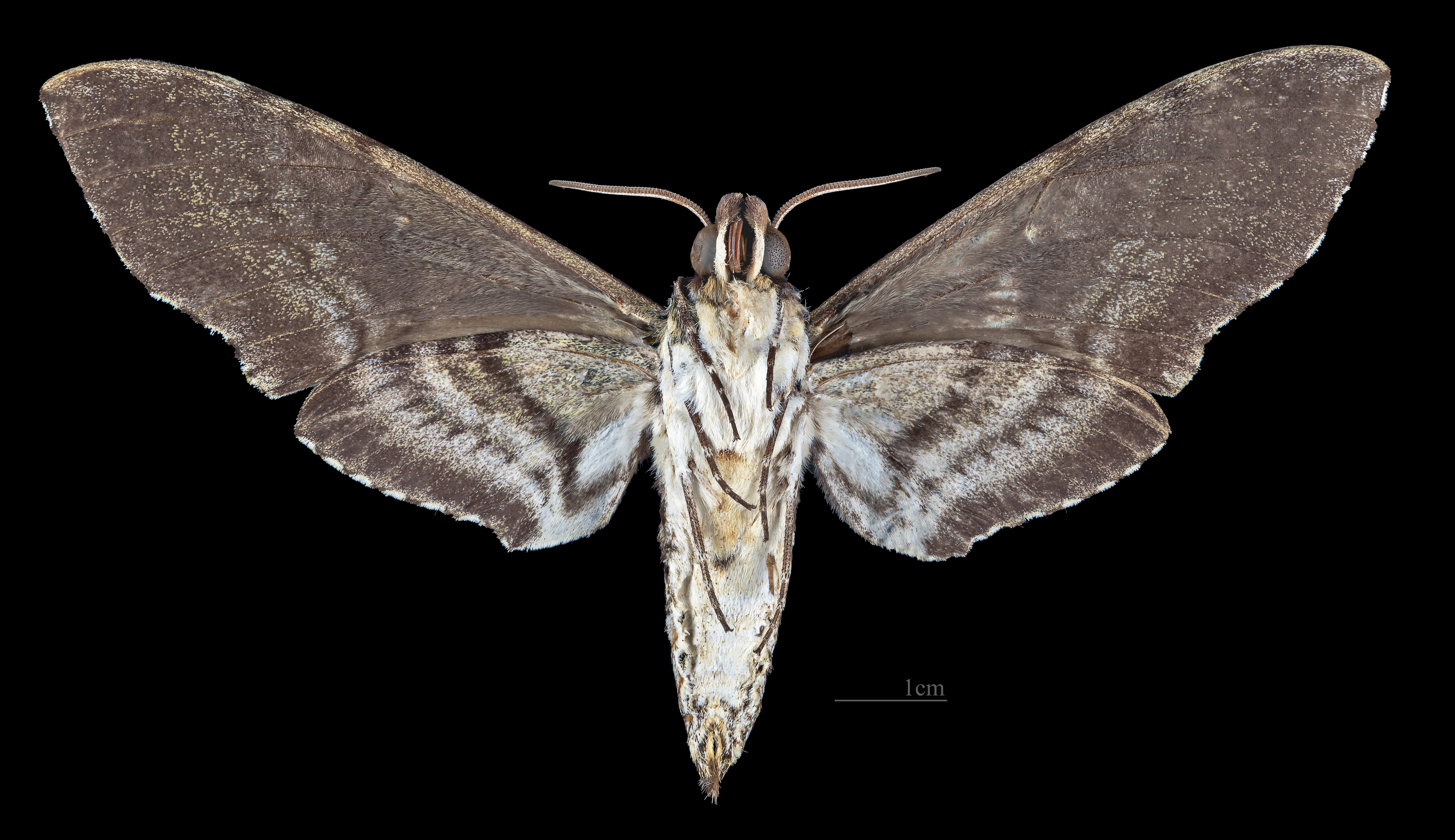
- Male ventral

Scientific classification
- Kingdom: Animalia
- Phylum: Arthropoda
- Class: Insecta
- Order: Lepidoptera
- Family: Sphingidae
- Genus: Manduca
- Species: M. extrema

Binomial name
- Manduca extrema (Gehlen, 1926)

Synonyms
- Protoparce extrema Gehlen, 1926

= Manduca extrema =

Species of moth

Manduca extrema is a moth of the family Sphingidae. It is known from Venezuela, Ecuador and Bolivia.

Adults have been recorded in October.
