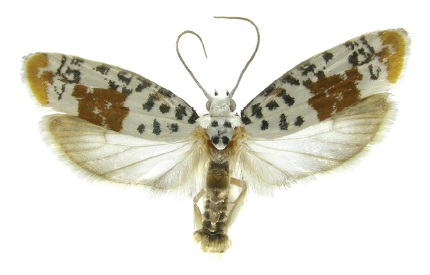

Scientific classification
- Domain: Eukaryota
- Kingdom: Animalia
- Phylum: Arthropoda
- Class: Insecta
- Order: Lepidoptera
- Family: Depressariidae
- Genus: Ethmia
- Species: E. perpulchra

Binomial name
- Ethmia perpulchra Walsingham, 1912

Synonyms
- Ethmia perpulcra

= Ethmia perpulchra =

Species of moth

Ethmia perpulchra is a moth in the family Depressariidae. It is found from Veracruz in Mexico to Guatemala, Honduras and Costa Rica.

The length of the forewings is 8.2–11.7 mm (0.32–0.46 in). The ground color of the forewings is white. The ground color of the hindwings is shining translucent white, becoming pale brownish apically. Adults are on wing from February to May.
