= Trauaxa =

Scientific classification
- Kingdom: Animalia
- Phylum: Arthropoda
- Class: Insecta
- Order: Lepidoptera
- Superfamily: Noctuoidea
- Family: Erebidae
- Subfamily: Hypeninae
- Genus: Trauaxa; Walker, [1866]
- Species: T. obliqualis

Binomial name
- Trauaxa obliqualis Walker, [1866]

Genus of moths

Trauaxa is a monotypic moth genus of the family Erebidae. Its only species, Trauaxa obliqualis, is found in Mexico, Panama, Honduras and the Brazilian state of Amazonas. Both the genus and the species were first described by Francis Walker in 1866.
