= Stenoma exarata =

Scientific classification
- Kingdom: Animalia
- Phylum: Arthropoda
- Clade: Pancrustacea
- Class: Insecta
- Order: Lepidoptera
- Family: Depressariidae
- Genus: Stenoma
- Species: S. exarata

Binomial name
- Stenoma exarata (Zeller, 1854)

Synonyms
- Cryptolechia exarata Zeller, 1854

Species of moth

Stenoma exarata is a moth in the family Depressariidae. It was described by Philipp Christoph Zeller in 1854. It is found in Costa Rica, Mexico, Guatemala, Venezuela, French Guiana and Brazil (Amazonas).
