= Stenoma patens =

Scientific classification
- Kingdom: Animalia
- Phylum: Arthropoda
- Class: Insecta
- Order: Lepidoptera
- Family: Depressariidae
- Genus: Stenoma
- Species: S. patens

Binomial name
- Stenoma patens Meyrick, 1913

Species of moth

Stenoma patens is a moth in the family Depressariidae. It was described by Edward Meyrick in 1913. It is found in Peru.

The wingspan is 34–43 mm (1.3–1.7 in). The forewings are glossy light greyish ochreous with the costal edge whitish. The stigmata are small and dark fuscous, the plical very obliquely beyond the first discal. There are very faint traces of a curved darker transverse series of cloudy dots at two-thirds and a curved series of subcrescentic dark fuscous dots from three-fourths of the costa to the dorsum before the tornus, sinuate inwards towards the costa. There is also a terminal row of blackish dots. The hindwings are light fuscous, on the apical third obscurely suffused with whitish ochreous.
