= Scopula suffundaria =

Scientific classification
- Kingdom: Animalia
- Phylum: Arthropoda
- Clade: Pancrustacea
- Class: Insecta
- Order: Lepidoptera
- Family: Geometridae
- Genus: Scopula
- Species: S. suffundaria

Binomial name
- Scopula suffundaria (Walker, 1861)

Synonyms
- Acidalia suffundaria Walker, 1861

Species of geometer moth in subfamily Sterrhinae

Scopula suffundaria is a moth of the family Geometridae. It is found in Honduras.
