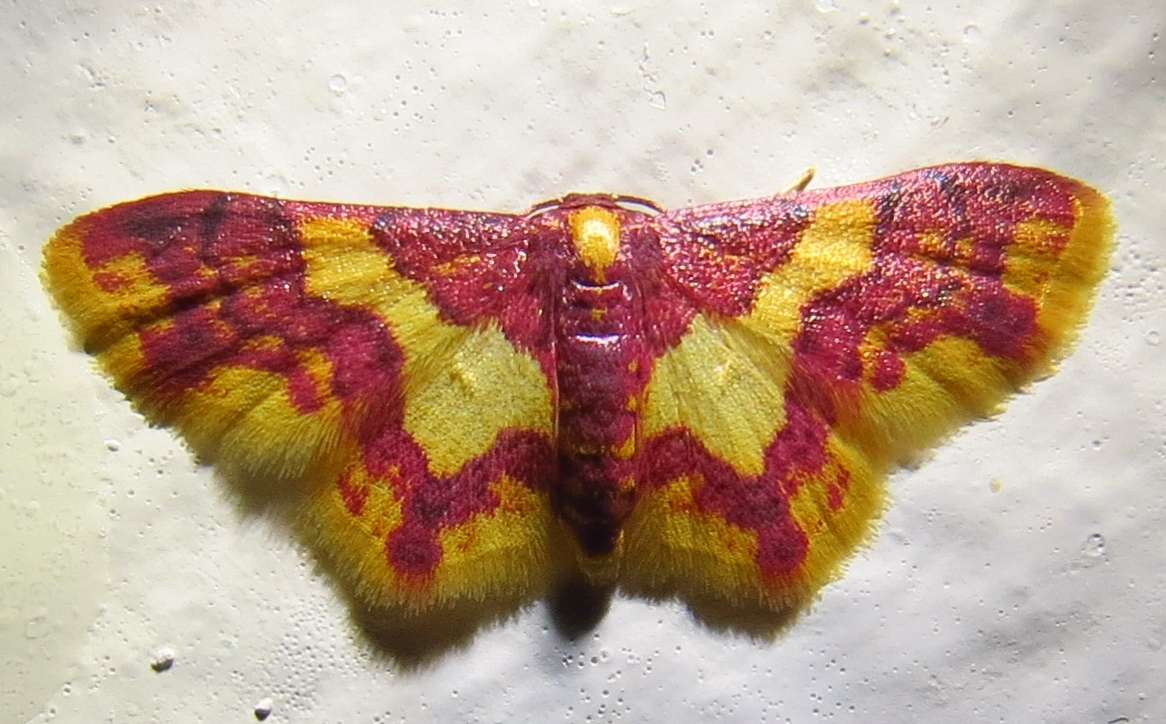
- Tricentrogyna vinacea

Scientific classification
- Kingdom: Animalia
- Phylum: Arthropoda
- Clade: Pancrustacea
- Class: Insecta
- Order: Lepidoptera
- Family: Geometridae
- Subfamily: Sterrhinae
- Genus: Tricentrogyna; Prout, 1932

= Tricentrogyna =

Genus of moths

Tricentrogyna is a genus of moths in the family Geometridae.
