= Nonazochis =

Scientific classification
- Domain: Eukaryota
- Kingdom: Animalia
- Phylum: Arthropoda
- Class: Insecta
- Order: Lepidoptera
- Family: Crambidae
- Subfamily: Spilomelinae
- Genus: Nonazochis; Amsel, 1956
- Species: N. graphialis

Binomial name
- Nonazochis graphialis (Schaus, 1912)

Synonyms
- Azochis graphialis Schaus, 1912

Genus of moths

Nonazochis is a monotypic moth genus of the family Crambidae described by Hans Georg Amsel in 1956. It contains only one species, Nonazochis graphialis, described by William Schaus in 1912, which is found in Costa Rica and Honduras.
