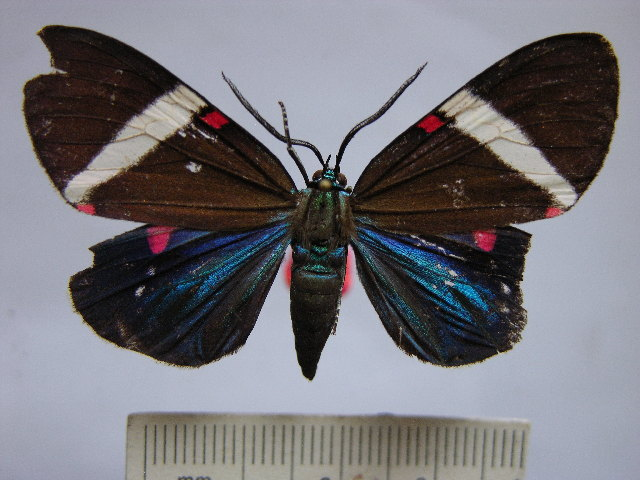

Scientific classification
- Kingdom: Animalia
- Phylum: Arthropoda
- Class: Insecta
- Order: Lepidoptera
- Superfamily: Noctuoidea
- Family: Erebidae
- Subfamily: Arctiinae
- Genus: Hypocrita
- Species: H. excellens

Binomial name
- Hypocrita excellens (Walker, 1854)

Synonyms
- Eucyane excellens Walker, 1854; Eucyane hermaea Druce, 1901

= Hypocrita excellens =

Species of moth

Hypocrita excellens is a moth of the family Erebidae. It was described by Francis Walker in 1854. It is found in Venezuela and Guatemala.
