= Phaeochlaena gyon =

Scientific classification
- Kingdom: Animalia
- Phylum: Arthropoda
- Clade: Pancrustacea
- Class: Insecta
- Order: Lepidoptera
- Superfamily: Noctuoidea
- Family: Notodontidae
- Genus: Phaeochlaena
- Species: P. gyon

Binomial name
- Phaeochlaena gyon (Fabricius, 1787)

Synonyms
- Zygaena gyon Fabricius, 1787; Phaeochlaena dorsistriga Strand, 1920; Phaeochlaena fucata Prout, 1918; Phaeochlaena obtecta Moschler, 1877; Phaeochlaena ochrophanes Prout, 1918; Actea remota Walker, 1856; Phaeochlaena tendinosa Hubner, 1818

Species of moth

Phaeochlaena gyon is a moth of the family Notodontidae first described by Johan Christian Fabricius in 1787. It is endemic to the Guyana Shield and points west, at least as far as the Upper Amazon basin of Colombia and Ecuador.
