= Stenoma impressella =

Scientific classification
- Kingdom: Animalia
- Phylum: Arthropoda
- Class: Insecta
- Order: Lepidoptera
- Family: Depressariidae
- Genus: Stenoma
- Species: S. impressella

Binomial name
- Stenoma impressella (Busck, 1914)

Synonyms
- Gonioterma impressella Busck, 1914; Stenoma cecropia Meyrick, 1916

Species of moth

Stenoma impressella is a moth in the family Depressariidae. It was described by August Busck in 1914. It is found in Panama.

The wingspan is 21–25 mm. The forewings are light reddish brown with a violet tinge, shaded with rich dark brown. At the base of the costa is a large dark brown area reaching down to the fold and from the basal third of the costa runs an oblique dark brown line across the wing to the apical third of the dorsum, edged basally with ochreous scales. At the end of the cell is a short, perpendicular, brown streak and the outer half of the costal area is dark brown. From just before the apex runs a dark brown line across the wing, nearly meeting the other crossline at right angles on the dorsal edge. The hindwings are bright golden ochreous with a reddish tinge toward the apex.
