= Antaeotricha particularis =

Scientific classification
- Kingdom: Animalia
- Phylum: Arthropoda
- Clade: Pancrustacea
- Class: Insecta
- Order: Lepidoptera
- Family: Depressariidae
- Genus: Antaeotricha
- Species: A. particularis

Binomial name
- Antaeotricha particularis (Zeller, 1877)

Synonyms
- Cryptolechia particularis Zeller, 1877

Species of moth

Antaeotricha particularis is a moth in the family Depressariidae. It was described by Philipp Christoph Zeller in 1877. It is found in Panama.
