= Scopula privata =

Scientific classification
- Kingdom: Animalia
- Phylum: Arthropoda
- Class: Insecta
- Order: Lepidoptera
- Family: Geometridae
- Genus: Scopula
- Species: S. privata

Binomial name
- Scopula privata (Walker, 1861)

Synonyms
- Acidalia privata Walker, 1861; Pigia semicostata Warren, 1904

Species of geometer moth in subfamily Sterrhinae

Scopula privata is a moth of the family Geometridae. It is found in Venezuela and Peru.
