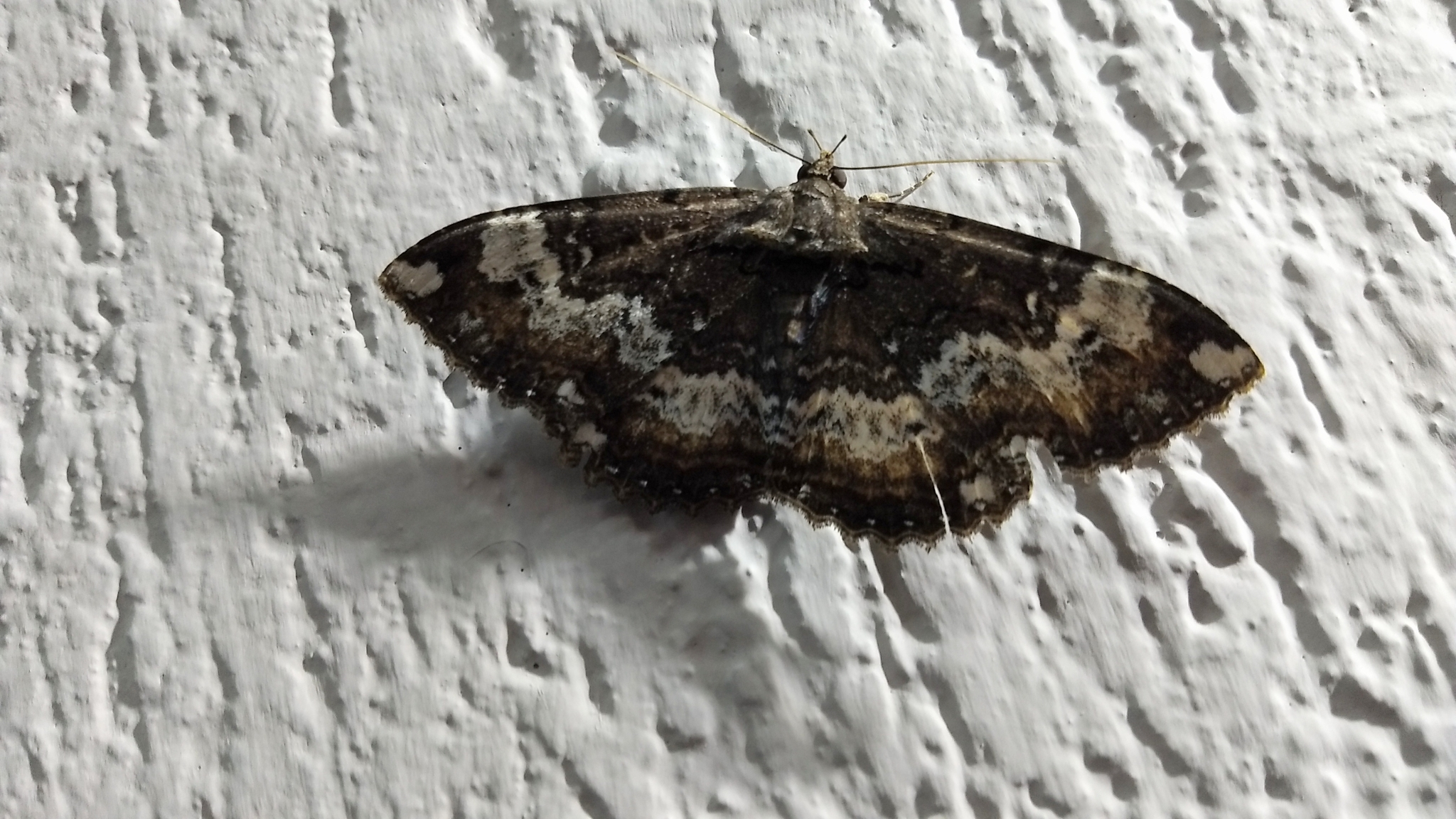

Scientific classification
- Kingdom: Animalia
- Phylum: Arthropoda
- Class: Insecta
- Order: Lepidoptera
- Superfamily: Noctuoidea
- Family: Noctuidae (?)
- Subfamily: Catocalinae
- Genus: Ramphia; Guenée, 1852
- Species: R. albizona

Binomial name
- Ramphia albizona Latreille, 1817

= Ramphia =

Genus of moths

Ramphia is a monotypic moth genus of the family Noctuidae erected by Achille Guenée in 1852. Its only species, Ramphia albizona, was first described by Pierre André Latreille in 1817. It is found in equatorial South America.
