= Scopula confertaria =

Scientific classification
- Domain: Eukaryota
- Kingdom: Animalia
- Phylum: Arthropoda
- Class: Insecta
- Order: Lepidoptera
- Family: Geometridae
- Genus: Scopula
- Species: S. confertaria

Binomial name
- Scopula confertaria (Walker, 1861)

Synonyms
- Acidalia confertaria Walker, 1861; Craspedia internexata Warren, 1904

Species of geometer moth in subfamily Sterrhinae

Scopula confertaria is a moth of the family Geometridae. It was described by Francis Walker in 1861. It is found in Honduras and Ecuador.
