= Euclysia =

Scientific classification
- Kingdom: Animalia
- Phylum: Arthropoda
- Class: Insecta
- Order: Lepidoptera
- Family: Geometridae
- Genus: Euclysia; Warren, 1894

Genus of moths

Euclysia is a genus of moths in the family Geometridae described by Warren in 1894.

== Species ==
- Euclysia columbipennis (Walker, 1860)
- Euclysia restricta Warren, 1894
