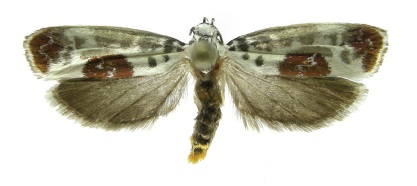

Scientific classification
- Domain: Eukaryota
- Kingdom: Animalia
- Phylum: Arthropoda
- Class: Insecta
- Order: Lepidoptera
- Family: Depressariidae
- Genus: Ethmia
- Species: E. ungulatella

Binomial name
- Ethmia ungulatella Busck, 1914

= Ethmia ungulatella =

Species of moth

Ethmia ungulatella is a moth in the family Depressariidae. It is found from Panama north through Central America to eastern Mexico. The habitat consists of dry forests and rain forests.

The length of the forewings is 8.4–10.4 mm (0.33–0.41 in). The ground color of the forewings is white with steel blue-gray spots. The ground color of the hindwings dorsad of the fold is gray, but darker toward the distal margins. Adults are on wing in April and May (in Panama) and in July and August (in Mexico). There are possibly multiple generations per year.
