= Eucereon rosa =

Scientific classification
- Kingdom: Animalia
- Phylum: Arthropoda
- Class: Insecta
- Order: Lepidoptera
- Superfamily: Noctuoidea
- Family: Erebidae
- Subfamily: Arctiinae
- Genus: Eucereon
- Species: E. rosa

Binomial name
- Eucereon rosa (Walker, 1854)

Synonyms
- Euchromia rosa Walker, 1854; Eucereon rosa f. rosadora Dyar, 1910; Eucereon rosa f. xanthodora Dyar, 1910

Species of moth

Eucereon rosa is a moth of the subfamily Arctiinae. It was described by Francis Walker in 1854. It is found in Honduras and Paraná, Brazil.
