= Stenoma catenifer =

Scientific classification
- Kingdom: Animalia
- Phylum: Arthropoda
- Class: Insecta
- Order: Lepidoptera
- Family: Depressariidae
- Genus: Stenoma
- Species: S. catenifer

Binomial name
- Stenoma catenifer Walsingham, 1912

Species of moth

Stenoma catenifer is a moth in the family Depressariidae. It was described by Lord Walsingham in 1912. It is found in Guatemala, Panama, Brazil, Colombia, Costa Rica, Guyana, Honduras, Mexico, Nicaragua, Panama, and Peru. The most harmful stage of Stenoma catenifer is the larval stage. The larvae dig into the avocado, reaching the seed where they feed and grow. After reaching maturity, they leave to become pupae, leaving the avocado with small holes and frass on its surface.

The wingspan is about 23 mm. The forewings are pale fawn ochreous, with some darker sprinkling towards the base and costa and on the middle of the dorsum. A strong blackish discal spot at the end of the cell, another half-way to the base on the upper edge of the cell, with a third in the middle of the fold. A series of inwardly pointed dentate blackish spots from the commencement of the costal to the beginning of the dorsal cilia forms a continuous chain with a similar series of more flattened spots around the apex and termen. The first portion of the chain, or that which crosses the wing surface, is abruptly angulated outward below the costa and above the tornus, the outer angle being abruptly cut off by a pair of strong spots opposite to a point a little above the termen. The hindwings are very pale fawn grey, somewhat iridescent between the veins.
