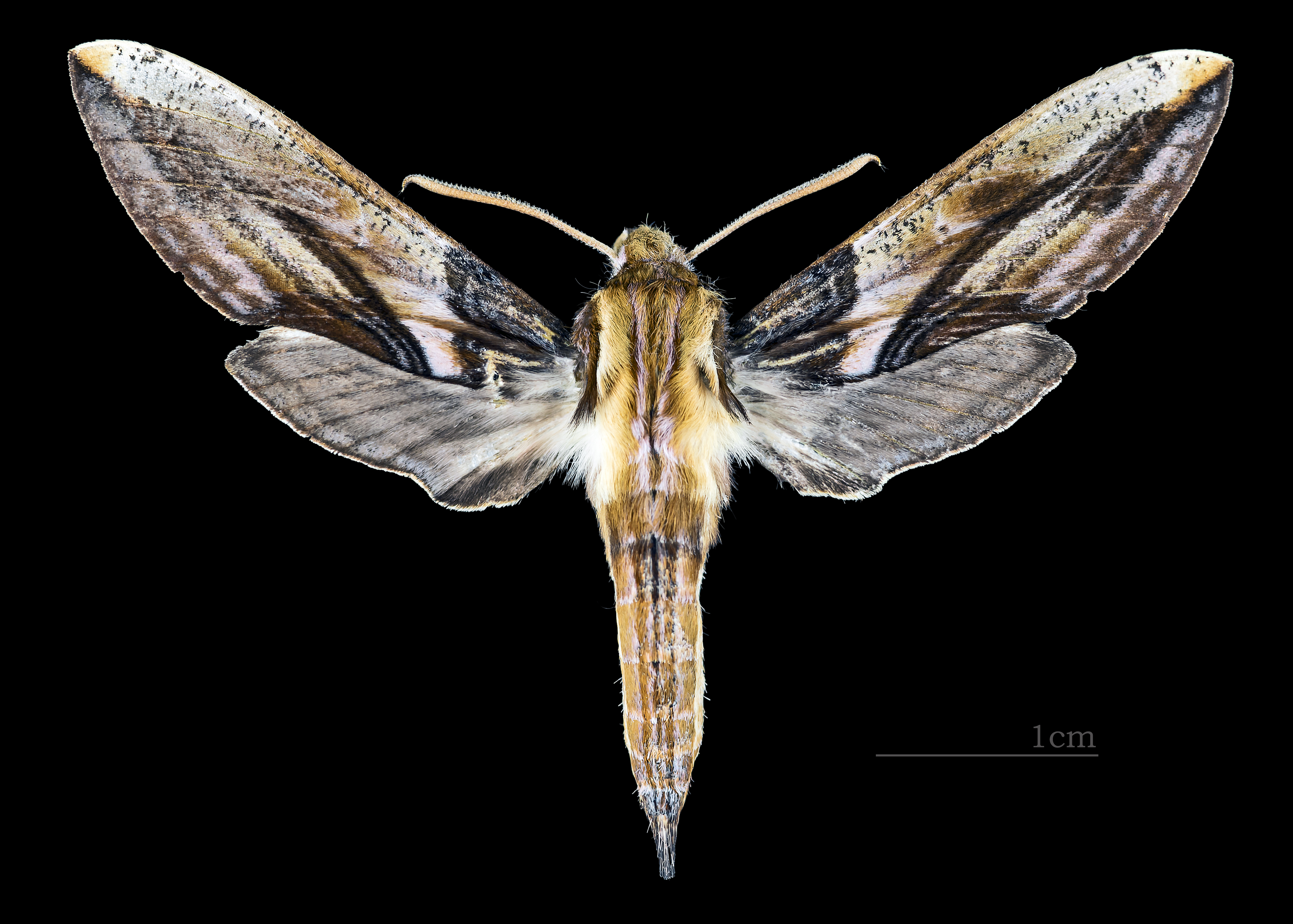
- Male dorsal
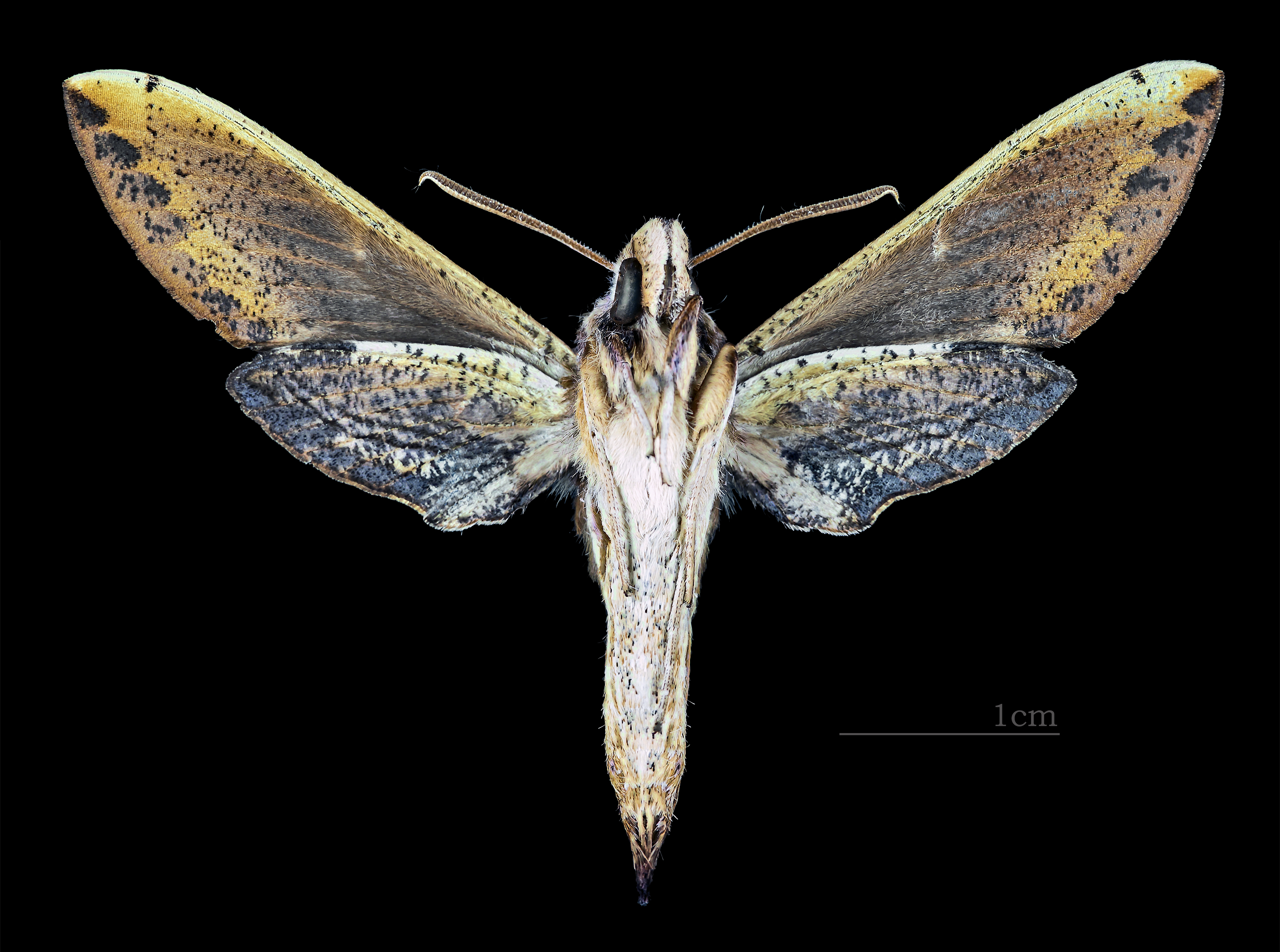
- Male ventral

Scientific classification
- Domain: Eukaryota
- Kingdom: Animalia
- Phylum: Arthropoda
- Class: Insecta
- Order: Lepidoptera
- Family: Sphingidae
- Genus: Xylophanes
- Species: X. jordani

Binomial name
- Xylophanes jordani Clark, 1916

= Xylophanes jordani =

Species of moth

Xylophanes jordani is a moth of the family Sphingidae.

== Repartition ==
It is known from Costa Rica.

== Description ==
The wingspan is 50–56 mm. The females are larger than the males. It is similar to Xylophanes thyelia thyelia but distinguishable by the conspicuous dark brown basal area of the forewing upperside and the shape of the postmedian lines. The forewing upperside has a conspicuous dark brown basal area, bounded distally by a sharp transverse edge. The postmedian lines arising on the inner edge are much more distally than in Xylophanes thyelia thyelia or Xylophanes pyrrhus. The first and second postmedian lines are narrow, parallel and close. The fourth and fifth postmedian lines run parallel to the second postmedian line to the inner margin.

== Biology ==
Adults are on wing year-round.

The larvae possibly feed on Psychotria panamensis, Psychotria nervosa and Pavonia guanacastensis.
