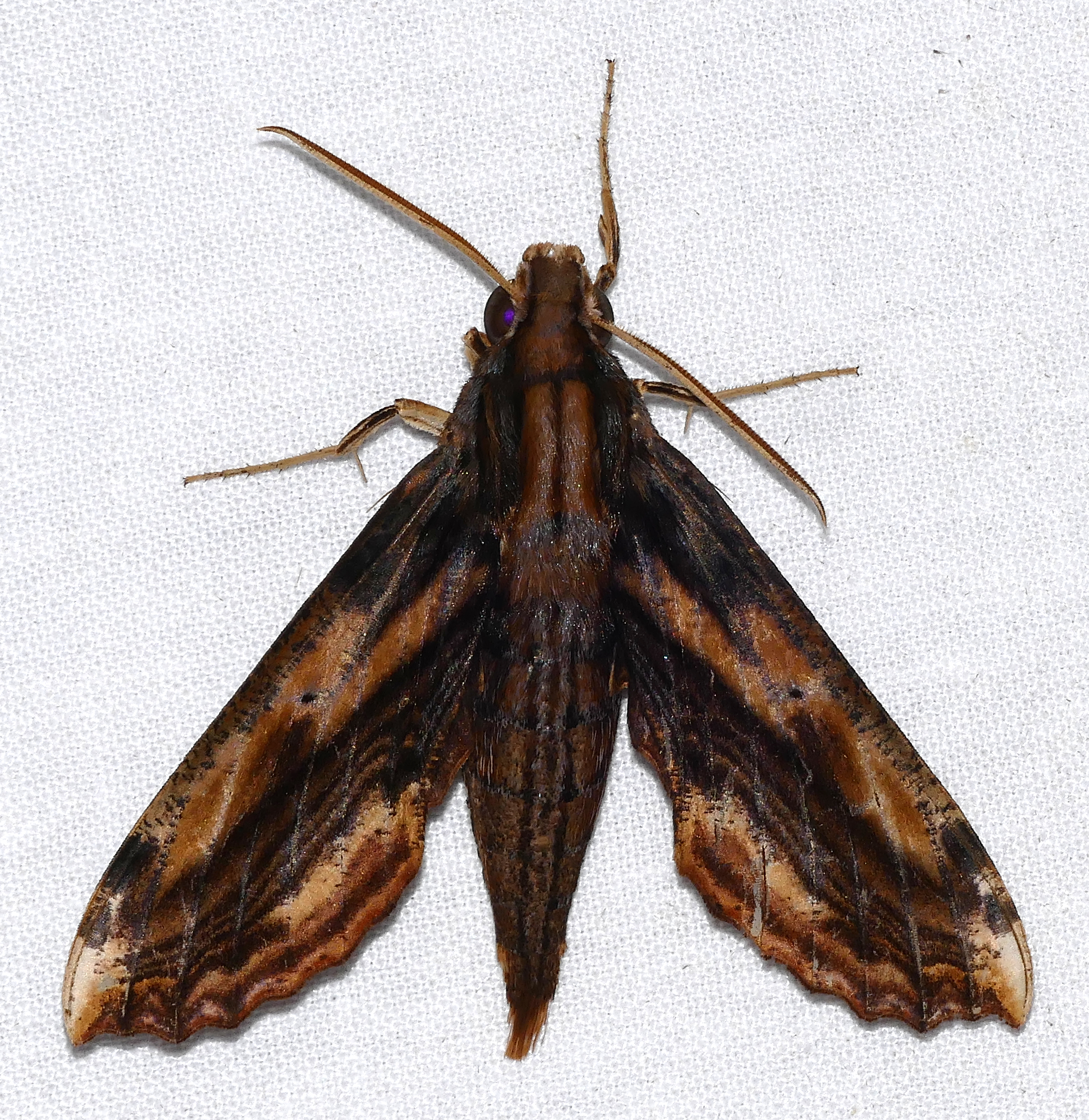
- Upperside

Scientific classification
- Domain: Eukaryota
- Kingdom: Animalia
- Phylum: Arthropoda
- Class: Insecta
- Order: Lepidoptera
- Family: Sphingidae
- Genus: Xylophanes
- Species: X. guianensis

Binomial name
- Xylophanes guianensis (Rothschild, 1894)

Synonyms
- Theretra guianensis Rothschild, 1894

= Xylophanes guianensis =

Species of moth

Xylophanes guianensis is a moth of the family Sphingidae.

== Distribution ==
It is found from French Guiana south-west to Bolivia.

== Description ==
It is similar to Xylophanes ceratomioides, but the outer margin of the forewing margin is much more strongly scalloped and the dorsal lines of the abdomen are as in Xylophanes xylobotes. The costa of the forewing upperside has several conspicuous subapical and apical black spots, the largest subapical spot is quadrate. Most distal antemedian lines and most basal postmedian lines meet on inner edge of the forewing upperside. The postmedian lines are clearly visible within the postmedian area. They are almost straight, except toward the inner edge of the wing. The pale brown excavated area on the outer margin of the postmedian band is narrow, rectangular and not well defined due to the visible presence within it of the third, fourth and fifth postmedian lines. The pale bands of the hindwing upperside are intermediate in coloration between those of Xylophanes ceratomioides and Xylophanes xylobotes.

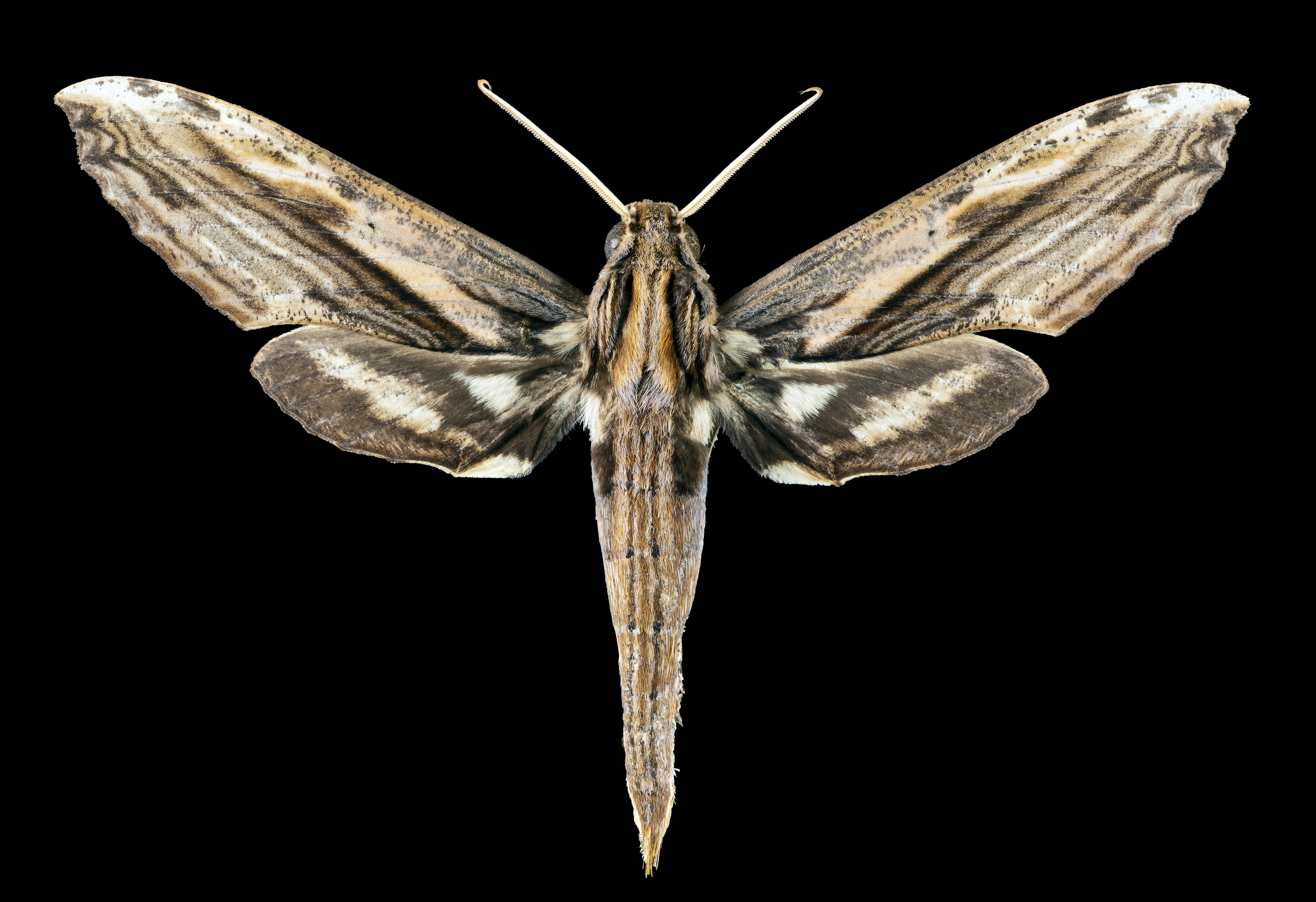
Male dorsal

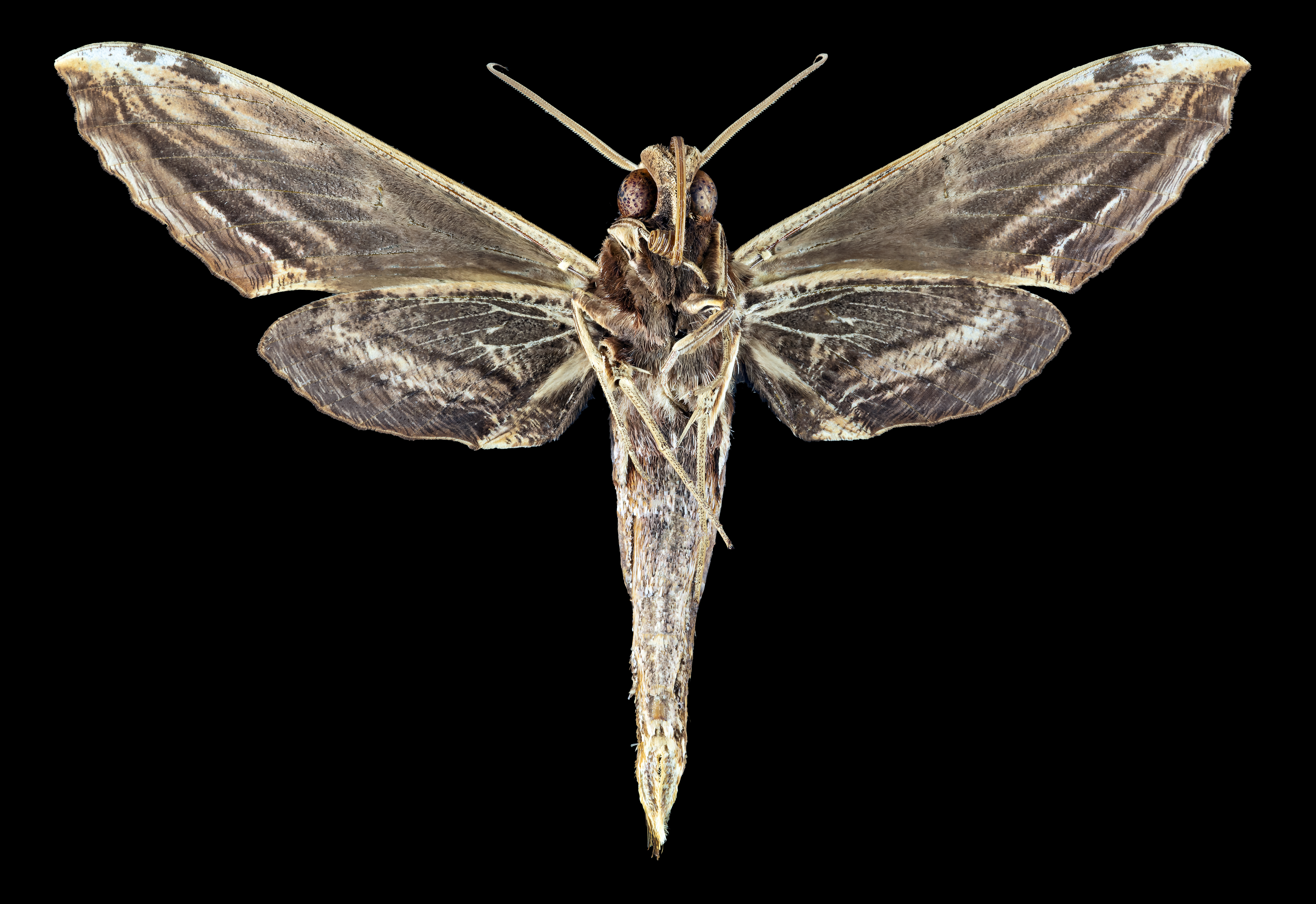
Male ventral

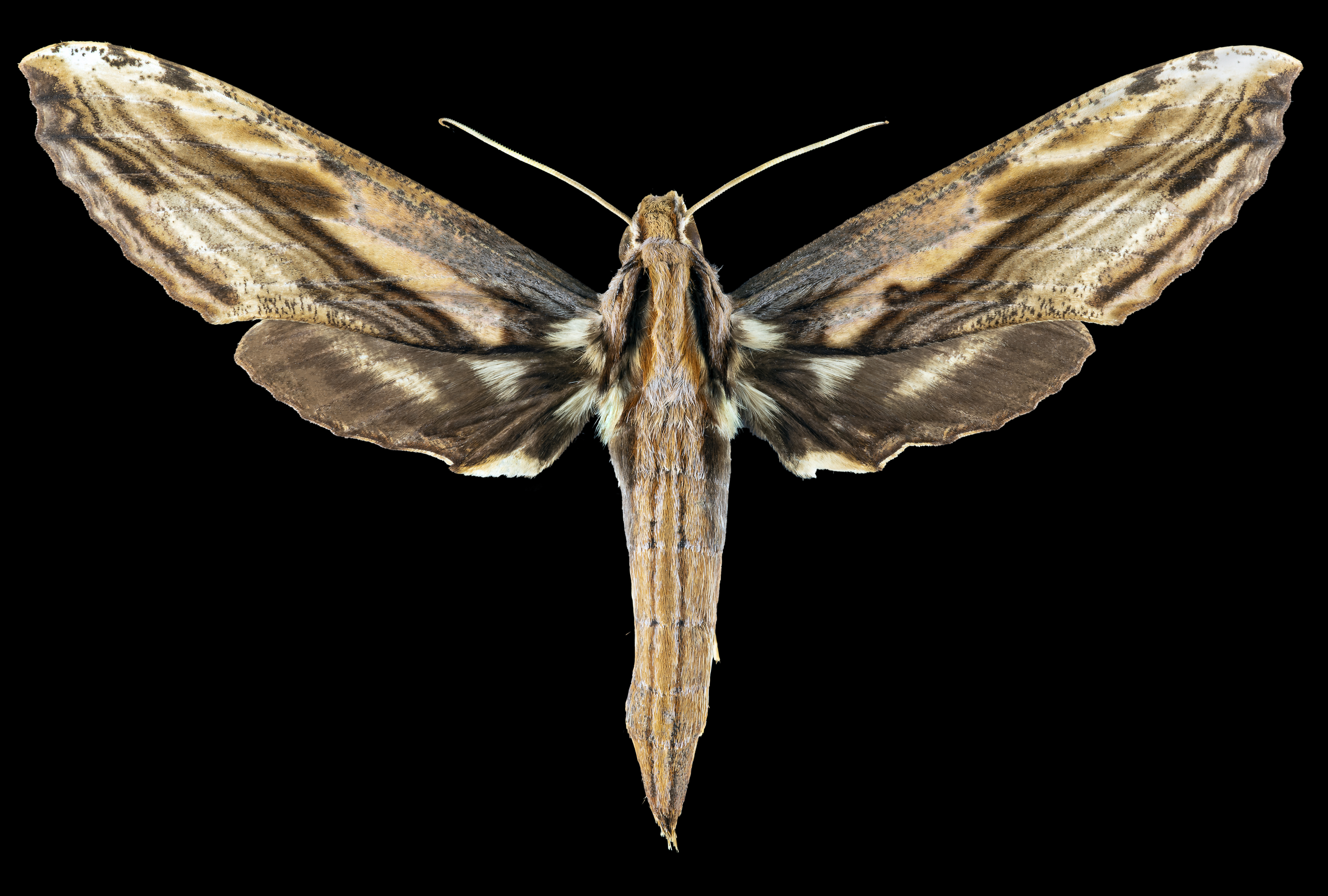
Female dorsal

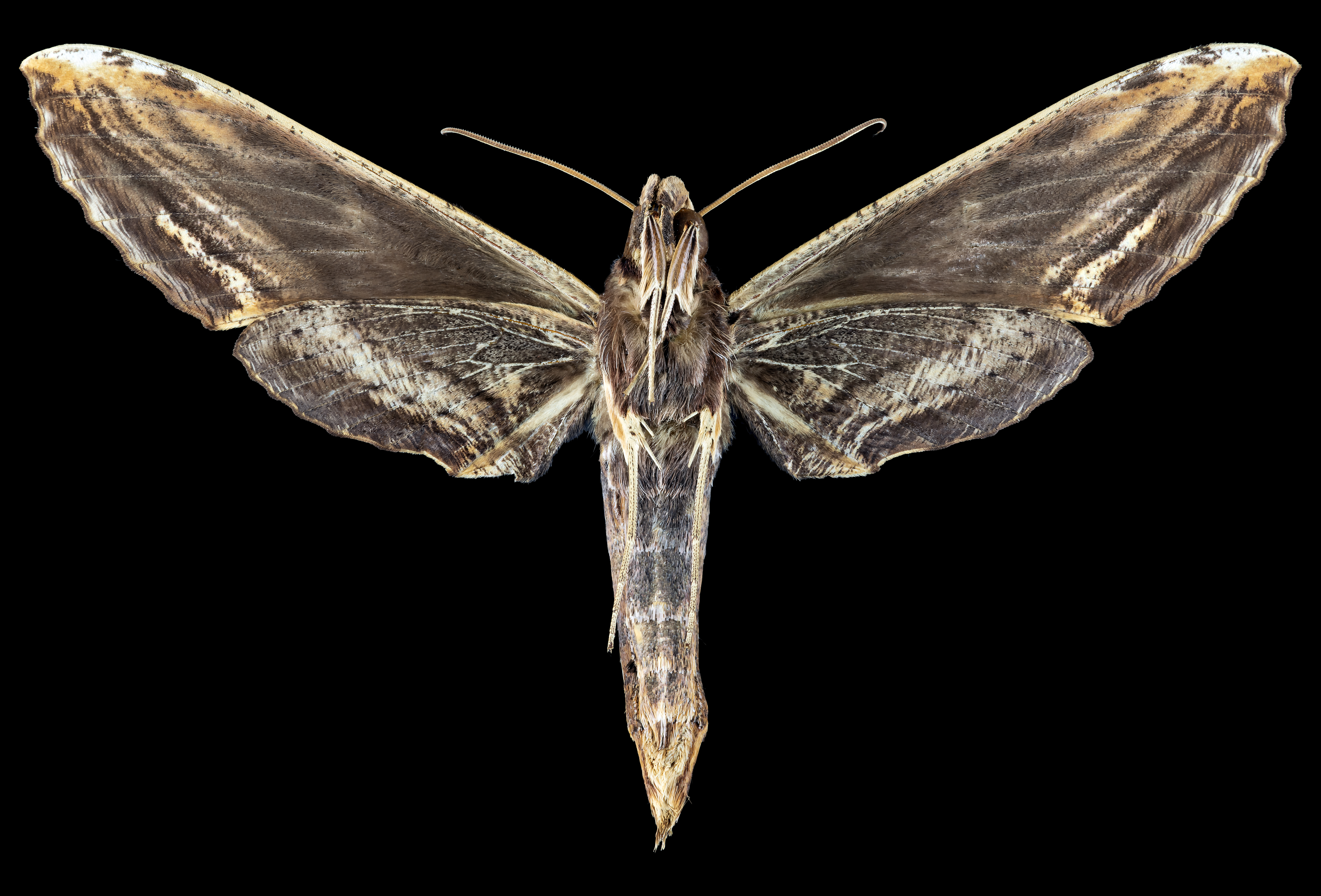
Female ventral

== Biology ==
There are probably multiple generations per year.

The larvae possibly feed on Psychotria panamensis, Psychotria nervosa and Pavonia guanacastensis.
