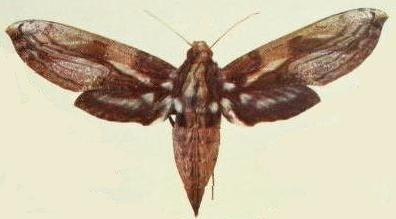

Scientific classification
- Domain: Eukaryota
- Kingdom: Animalia
- Phylum: Arthropoda
- Class: Insecta
- Order: Lepidoptera
- Family: Sphingidae
- Genus: Xylophanes
- Species: X. media

Binomial name
- Xylophanes media Rothschild & Jordan, 1903

= Xylophanes media =

Species of moth

Xylophanes media is a moth of the family Sphingidae first described by Walter Rothschild and Karl Jordan in 1903.

== Distribution ==
It is known from Colombia, Peru, Venezuela and Bolivia.

== Description ==
It is similar to Xylophanes ceratomioides, but the outer margin of the forewing is less rounded and very slightly undulate. The outermost dorsal lines of the abdomen are posteriorly divergent on each tergite, but not expanded into small triangular spots. The forewing upperside pattern is also similar to Xylophanes ceratomioides, but all elements are more diffuse, the costa is lacking subapical and apical black spots and in general the distal antemedian line and basal postmedian line meet on the inner edge of the forewing upperside. The postmedian band is not clearly developed. There is a pale brown excavated area on the outer margin of the postmedian band. The subbasal and median bands of the hindwing upperside are pale grey, shaded with brown and the edges of the median band are especially diffuse.

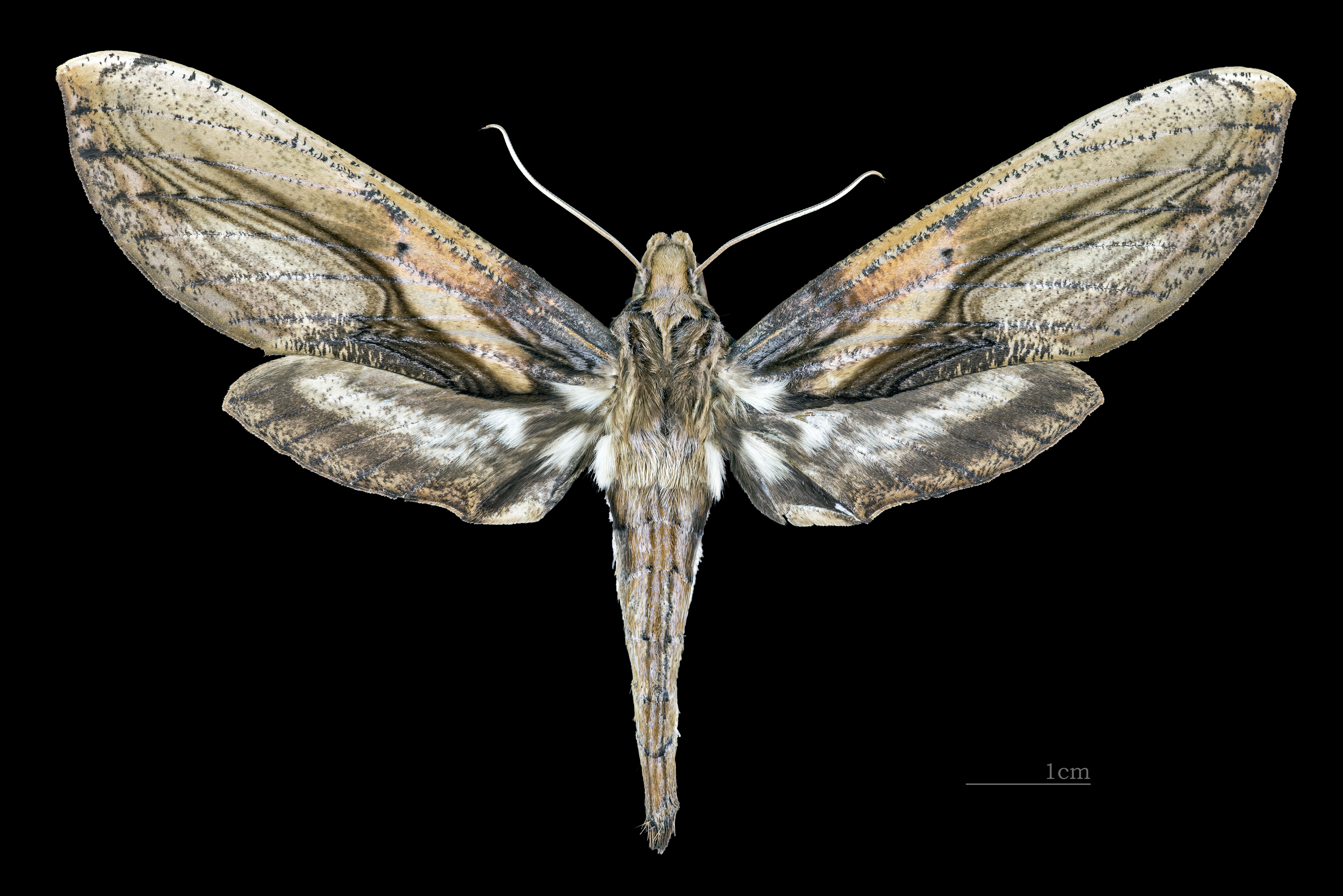
Female dorsal view

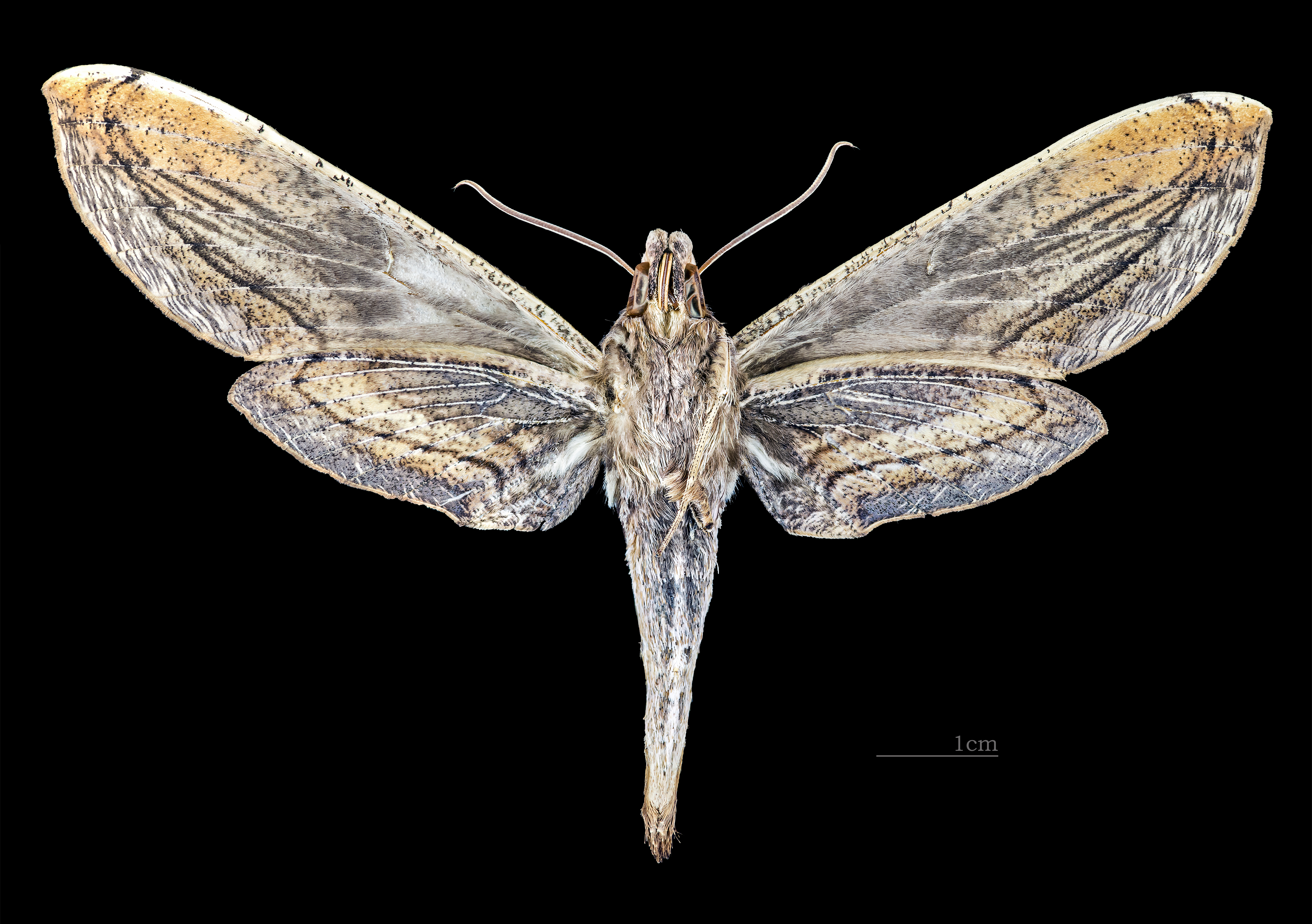
Female ventral view

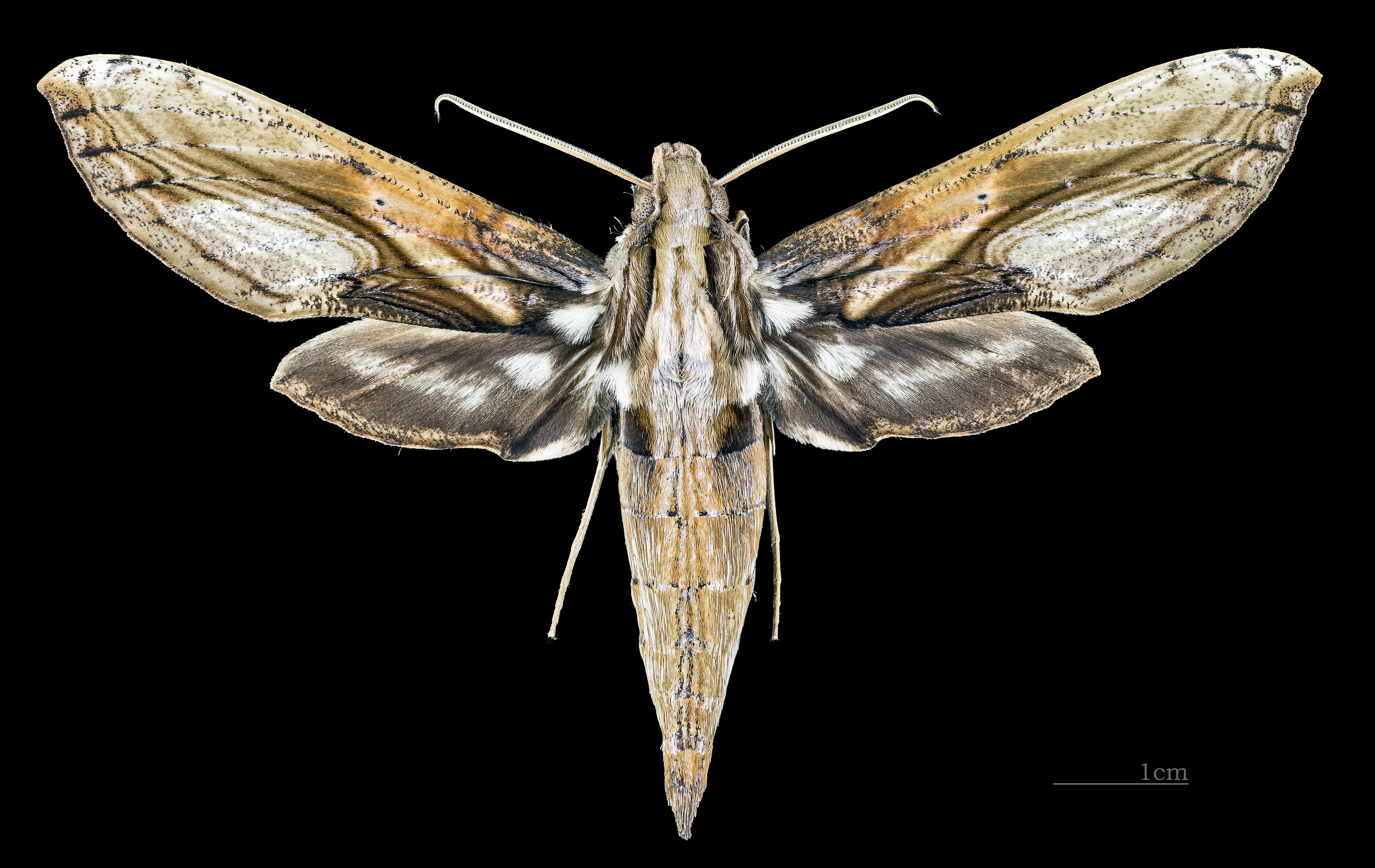
Male dorsal view

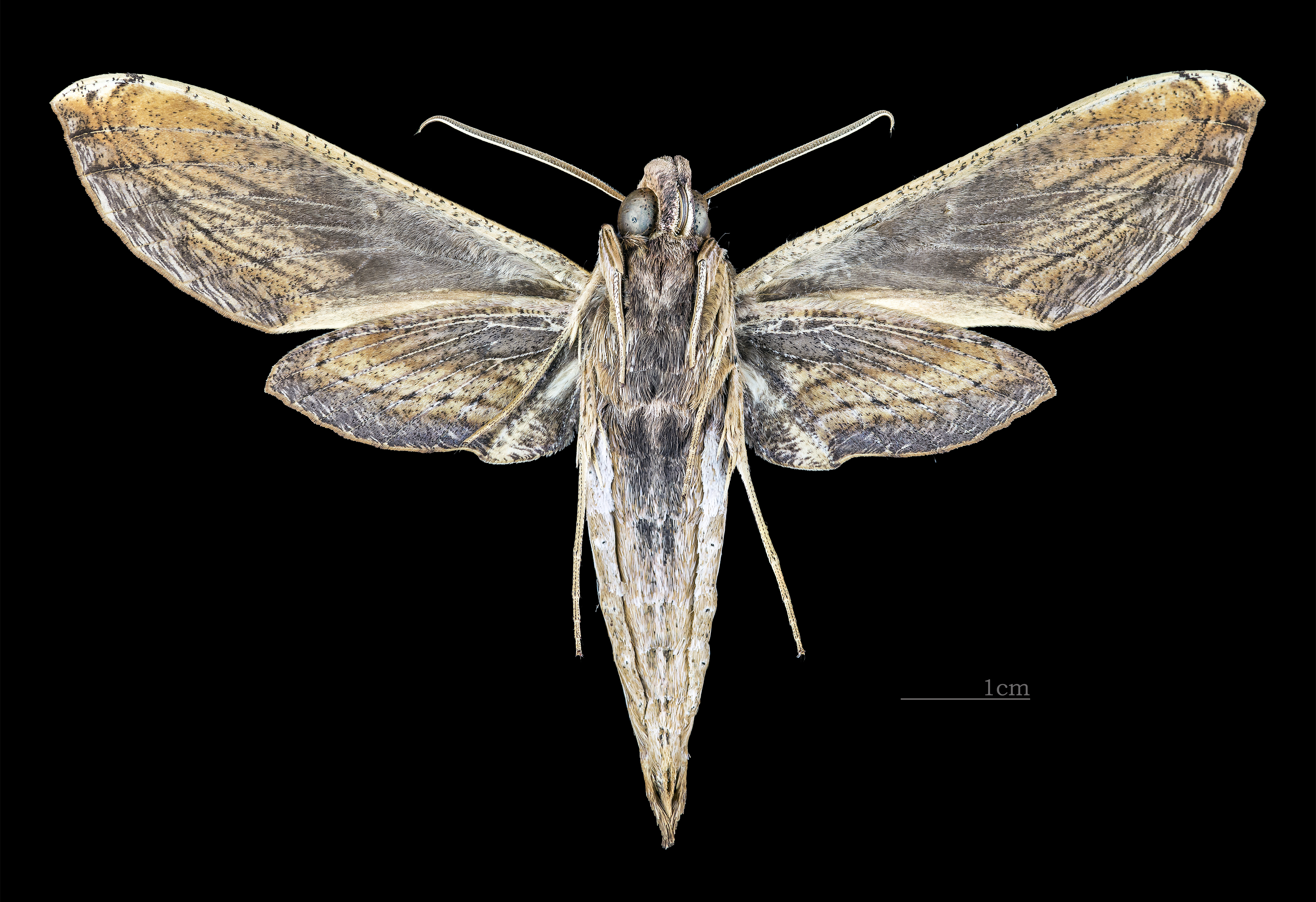
Male ventral view

== Biology ==
Adults are probably on wing year round.

The larvae probably feed on Rubiaceae and Malvaceae species.
