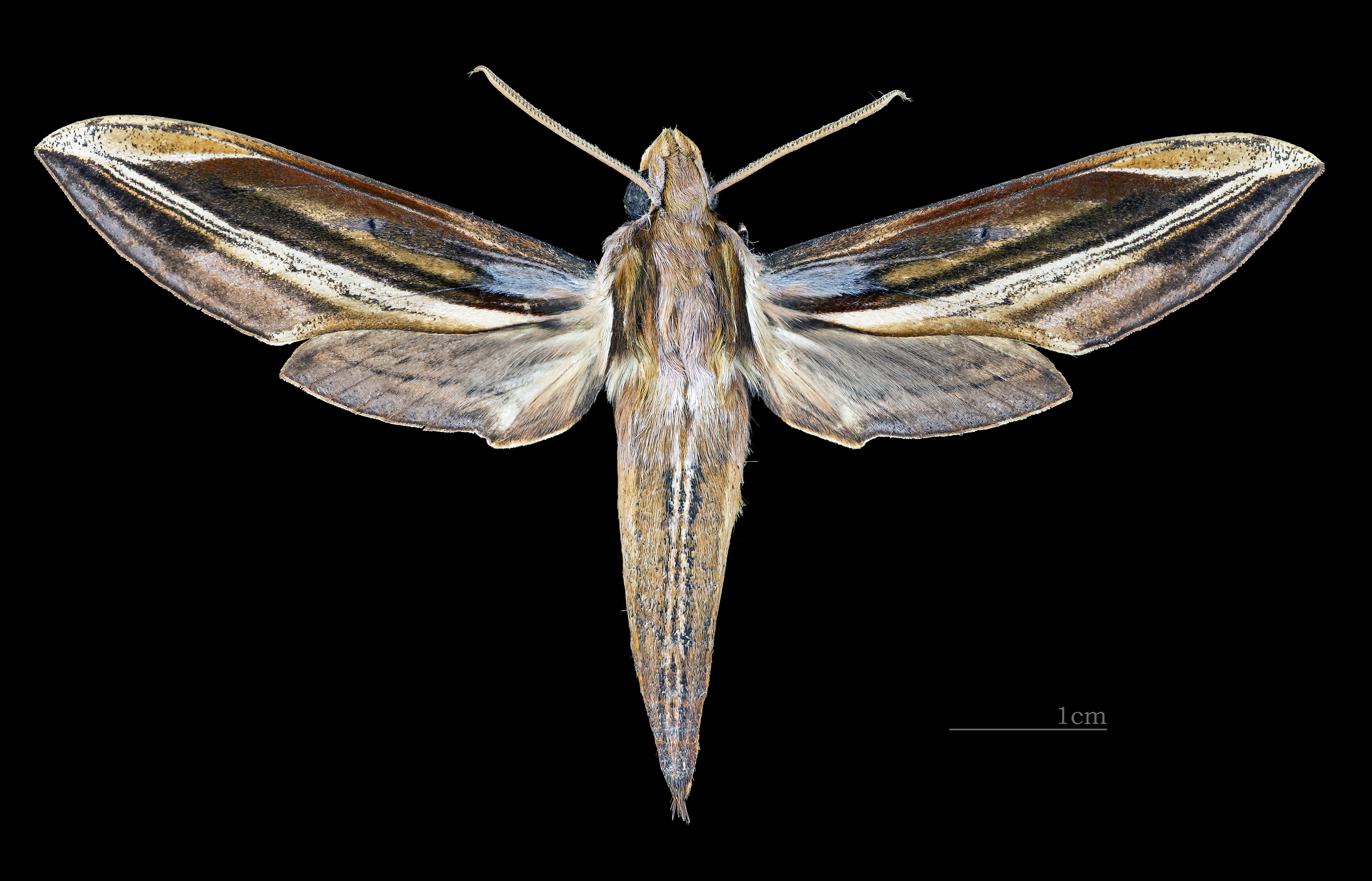
- Xylophanes pyrrhus male dorsal
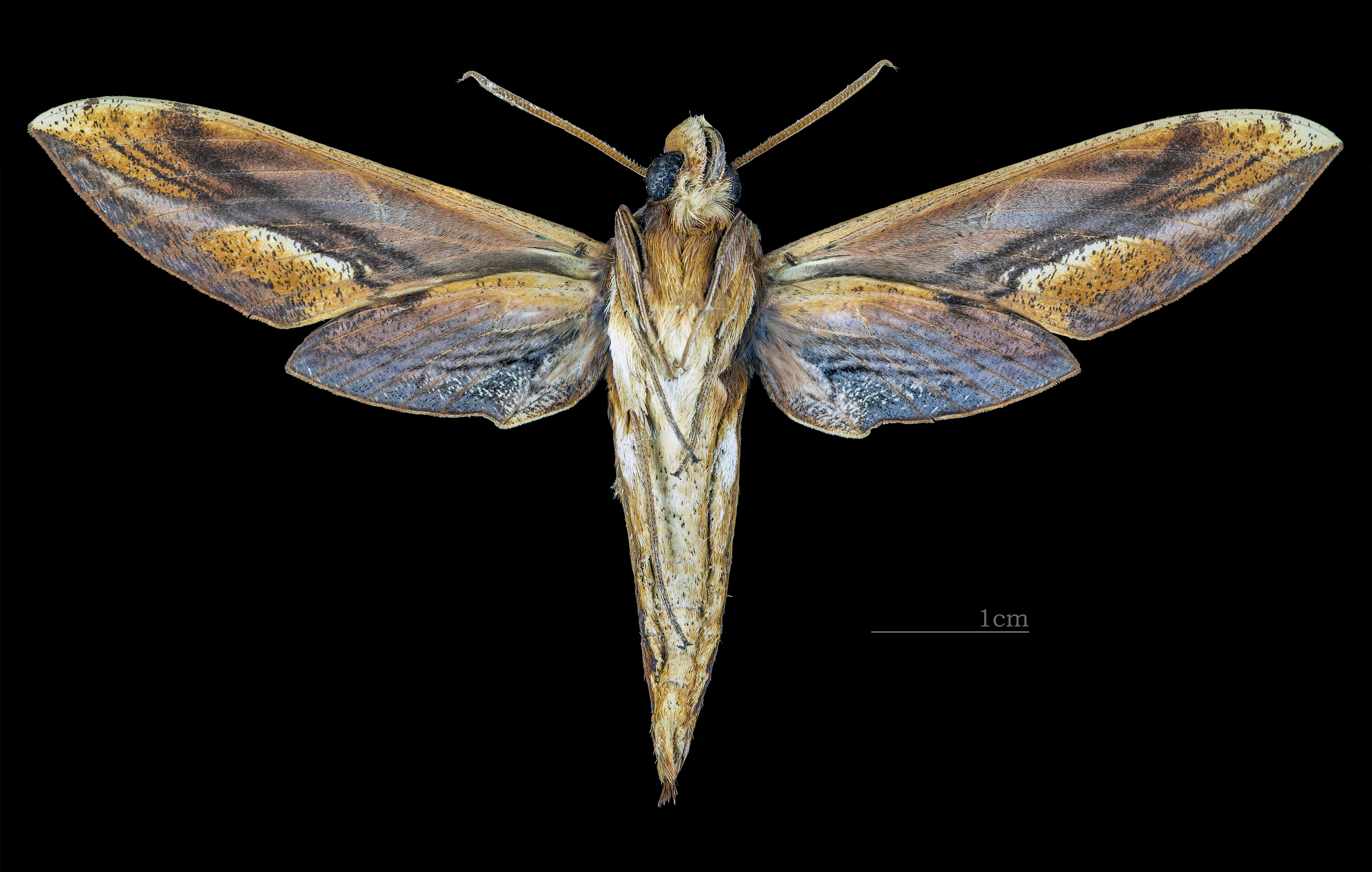
- Xylophanes pyrrhus male ventral

Scientific classification
- Domain: Eukaryota
- Kingdom: Animalia
- Phylum: Arthropoda
- Class: Insecta
- Order: Lepidoptera
- Family: Sphingidae
- Genus: Xylophanes
- Species: X. pyrrhus

Binomial name
- Xylophanes pyrrhus Rothschild & Jordan, 1906

= Xylophanes pyrrhus =

Species of moth

Xylophanes pyrrhus is a moth of the family Sphingidae.

== Repartition ==
It is found from Venezuela, Ecuador and Peru south to Bolivia.

== Description ==
The length of the forewings is 33–37 mm. It is similar to Xylophanes thyelia thyelia but larger and there are differences in the pattern on the forewing upperside, such as a smaller discal spot.

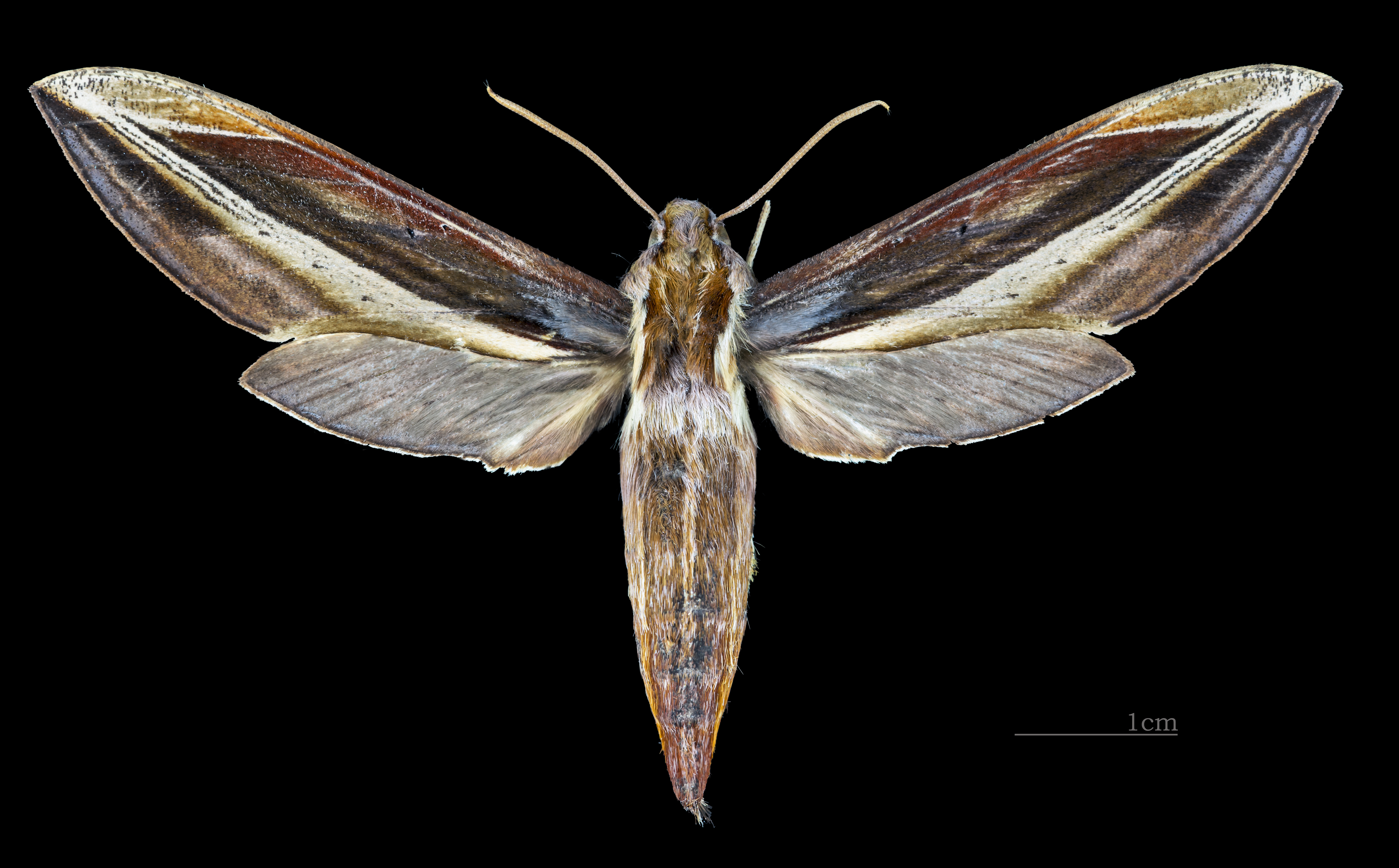
Female dorsal
(coll.MHNT)

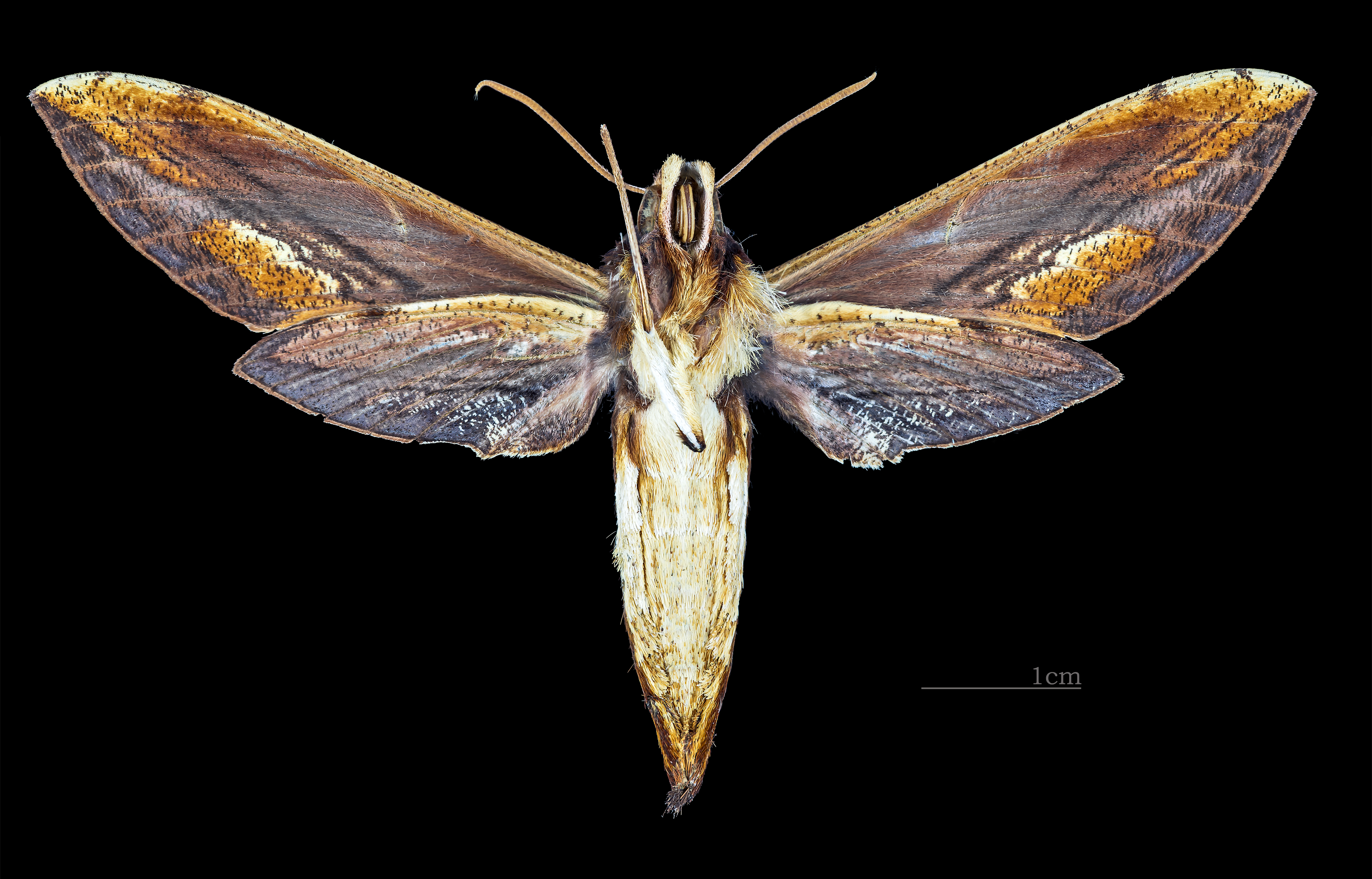
Female ventral
(coll.MHNT)

== Biology ==
Adults are on wing in August in Bolivia and September in Peru.
