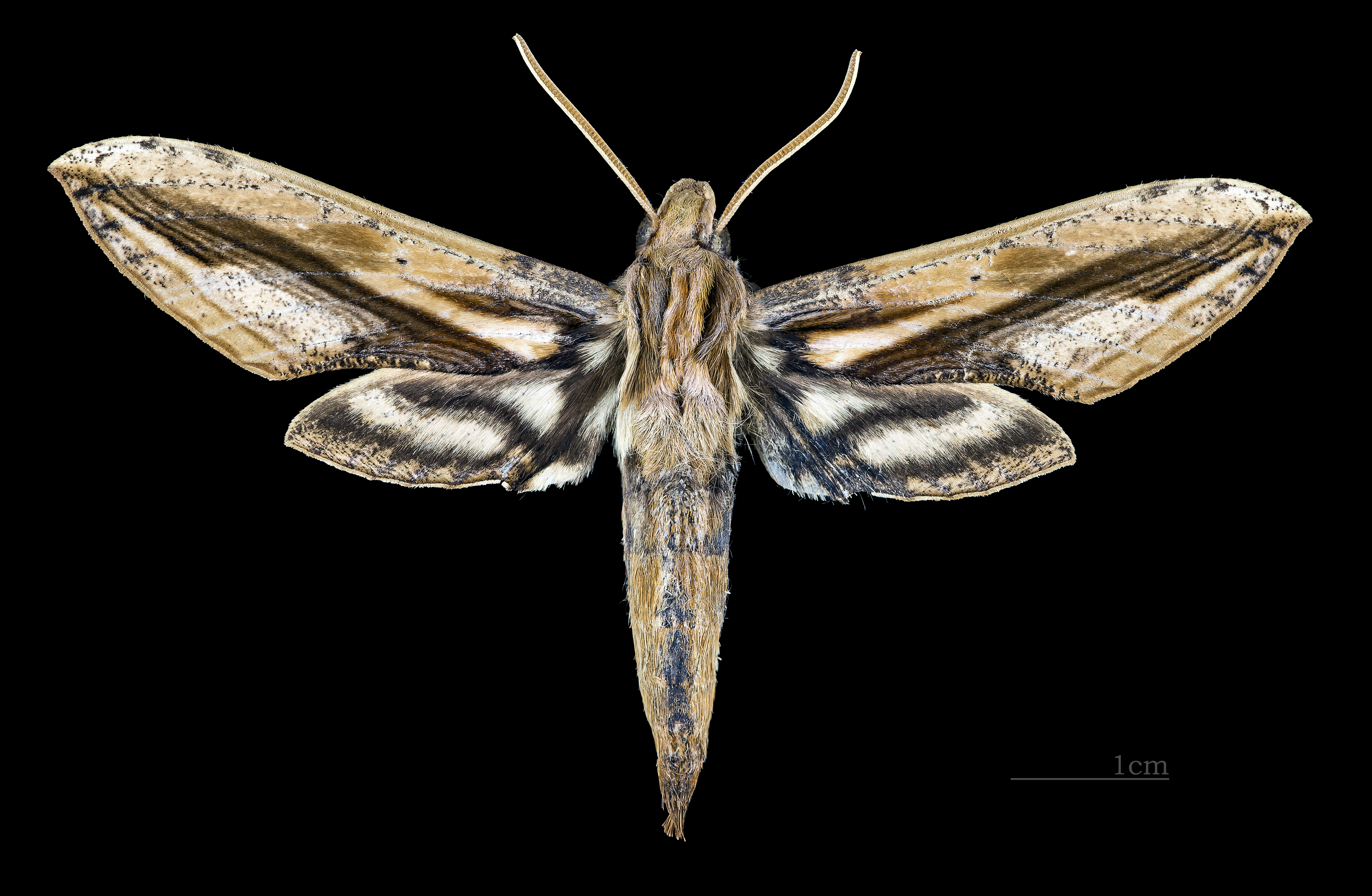
- Dorsal male
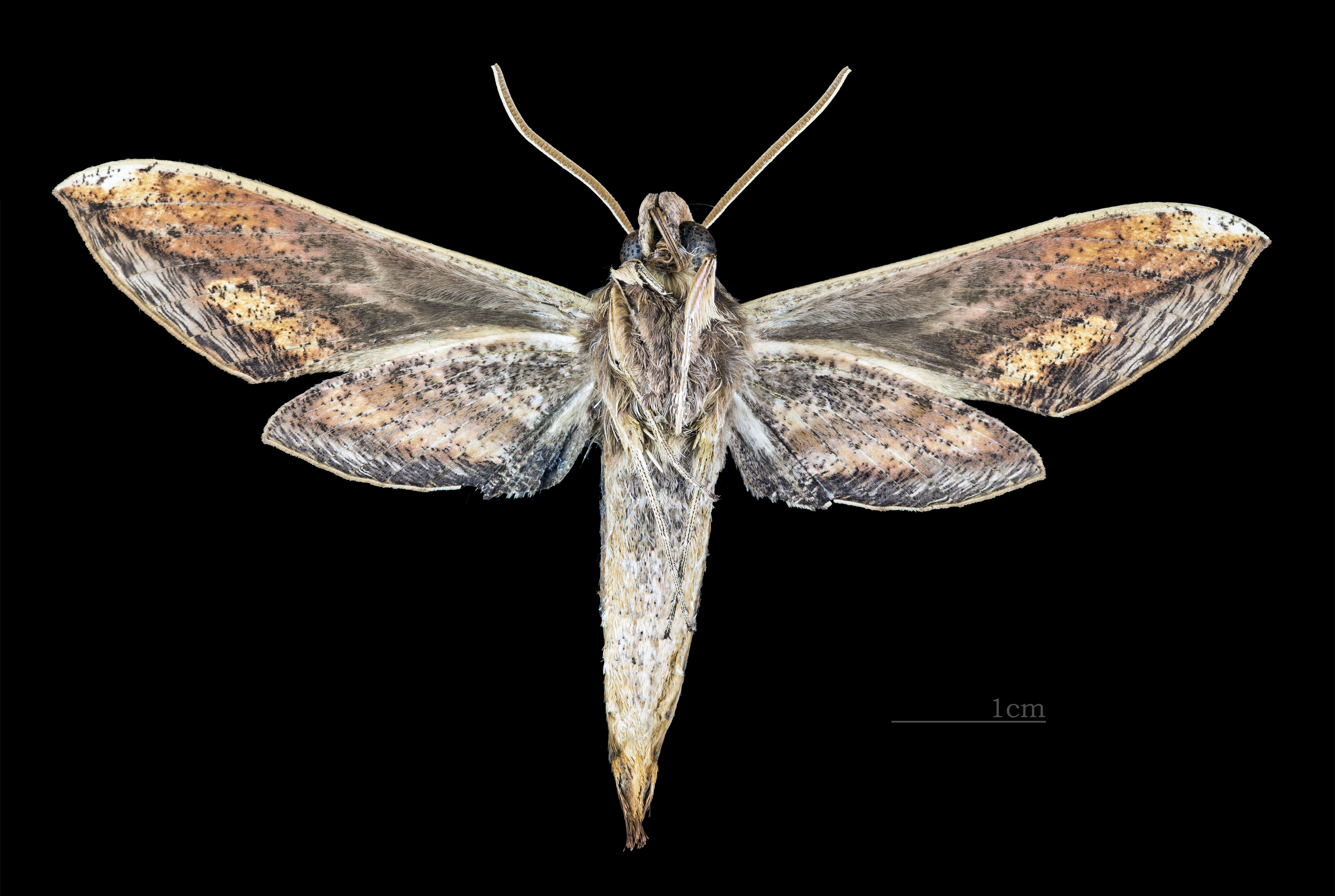
- Ventral male

Scientific classification
- Kingdom: Animalia
- Phylum: Arthropoda
- Class: Insecta
- Order: Lepidoptera
- Family: Sphingidae
- Genus: Xylophanes
- Species: X. xylobotes

Binomial name
- Xylophanes xylobotes (Burmeister, 1878)

Synonyms
- Choerocampa xylobotes Burmeister, 1878

= Xylophanes xylobotes =

Species of moth

Xylophanes xylobotes is a moth of the family Sphingidae. It is known from Peru.

It is similar to Xylophanes ceratomioides, but paler and all three dorsal abdominal lines are evenly narrow and continuous. The black apical line of the antenna is very short. The forewing upperside is also very similar in general pattern to Xylophanes ceratomioides, but the ground colour is pale brown and the black pattern elements are less extensive. The basal patch on the inner edge is pale greenish-buff and the costa has several vestigial subapical and apical black spots. The pale subbasal and median bands of the hindwing upperside are fawn.

There are probably three generations per year, with adults recorded in February, June and October.

The larvae probably feed on Rubiaceae species.
