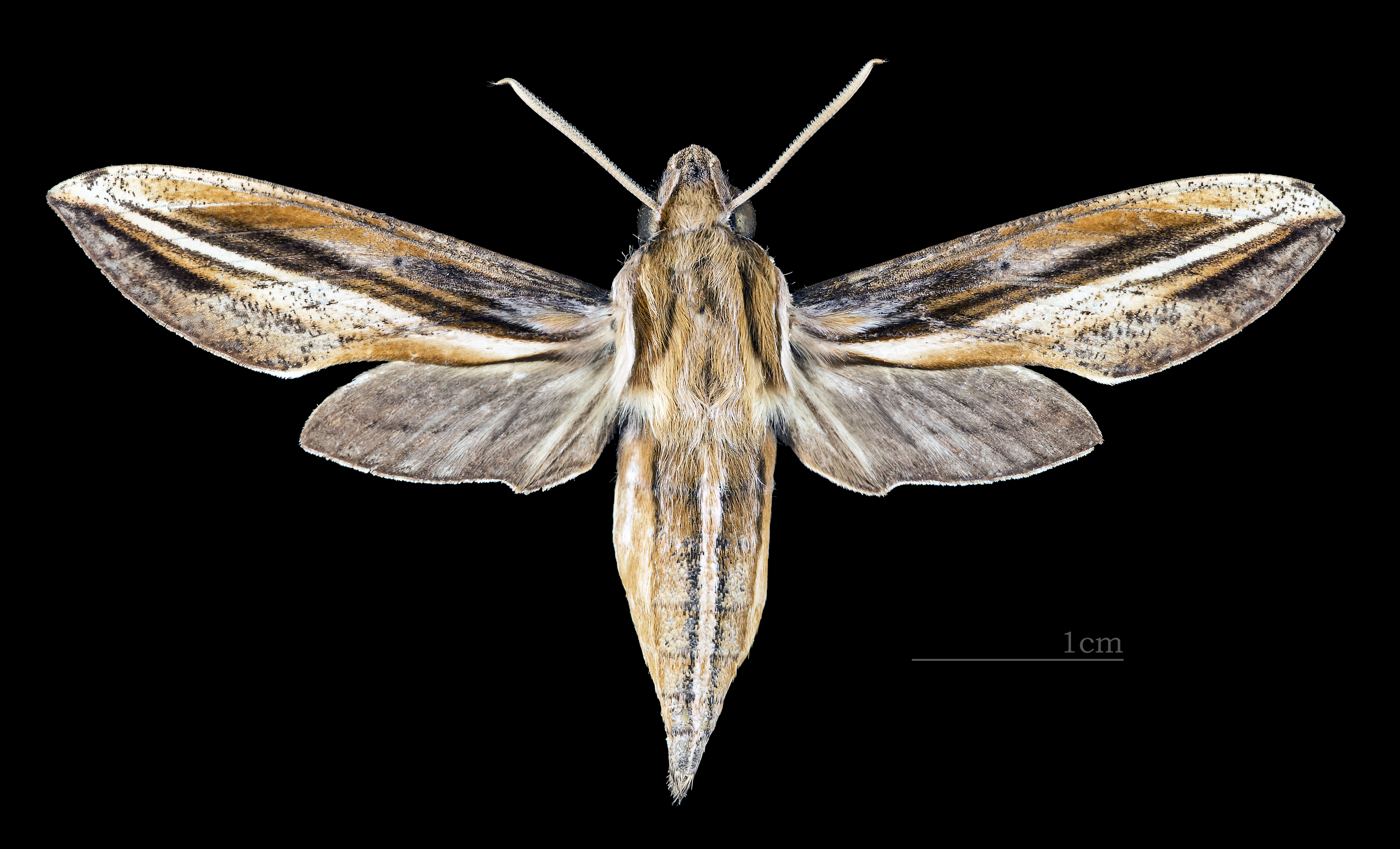
- Male
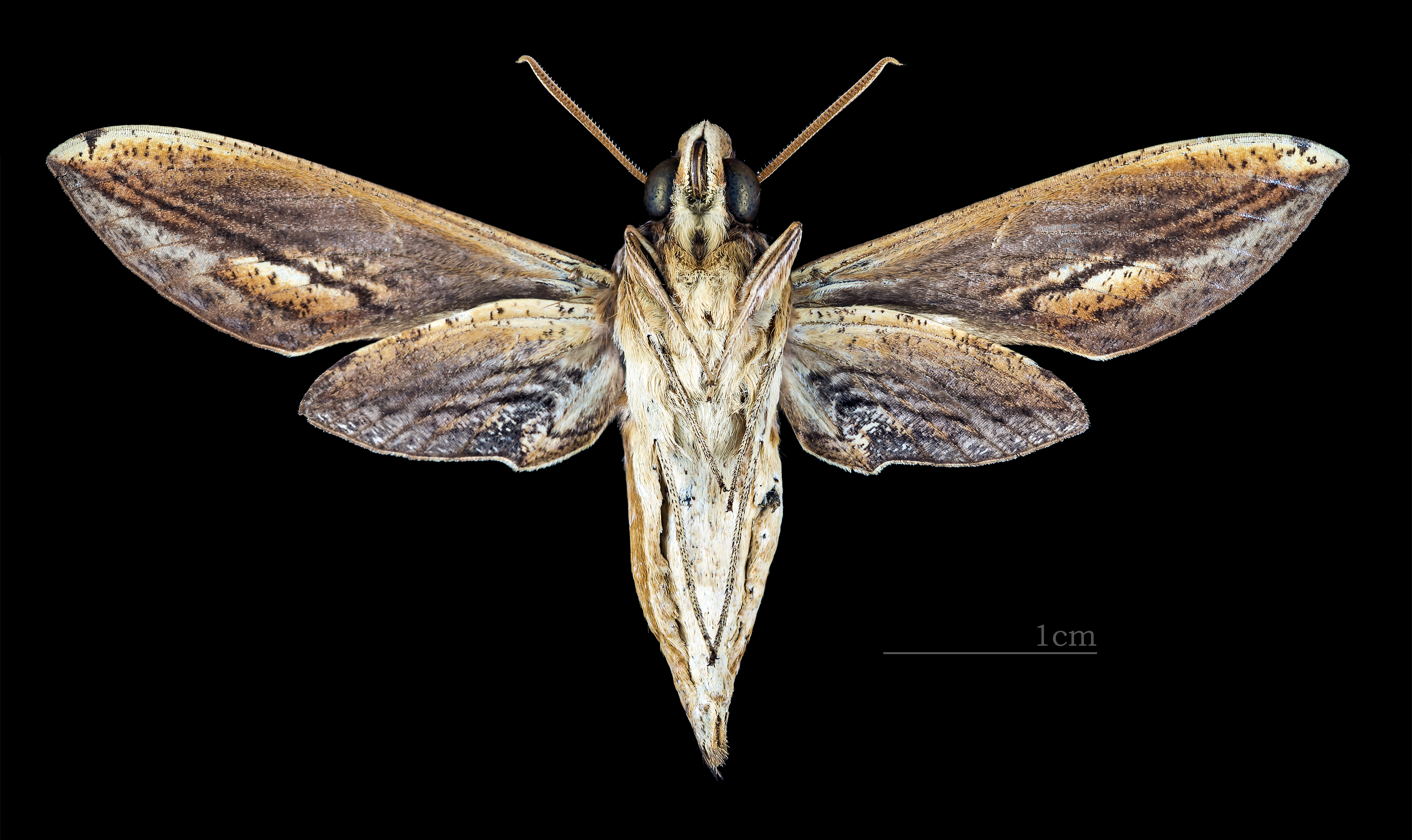
- Male underside

Scientific classification
- Kingdom: Animalia
- Phylum: Arthropoda
- Class: Insecta
- Order: Lepidoptera
- Family: Sphingidae
- Genus: Xylophanes
- Species: X. thyelia

Binomial name
- Xylophanes thyelia (Linnaeus, 1758)

Synonyms
- Sphinx thyelia Linnaeus, 1758; Choerocampa thyelia salvini Druce, 1878

= Xylophanes thyelia =

Species of moth

Xylophanes thyelia is a moth of the family Sphingidae. The species was first described by Carl Linnaeus in his 1758 10th edition of Systema Naturae.

== Distribution ==
It is found from Mexico through Central America to Venezuela, Colombia, Ecuador and Peru and further south into Bolivia, Paraguay and Argentina.

== Description ==
The wingspan is 53–54 mm. It is similar to the Xylophanes ceratomioides species group, but much smaller. There is a dark longitudinal line on the head, which is bordered ventrally with buff above the antenna. The tegula has a dark brown median line, bordered on each side by a pale grey stripe and irrorated with pale purple. The abdomen has a brown midline bordered by narrow grey lines. The forewing upperside is dark brown and buff. There is a short dark line present basal to the first postmedian line, reaching as far as the discal spot. The forewing underside has three dark brown or black and parallel postmedian lines. The hindwing upperside is almost uniform grey brown and the median band is barely indicated.

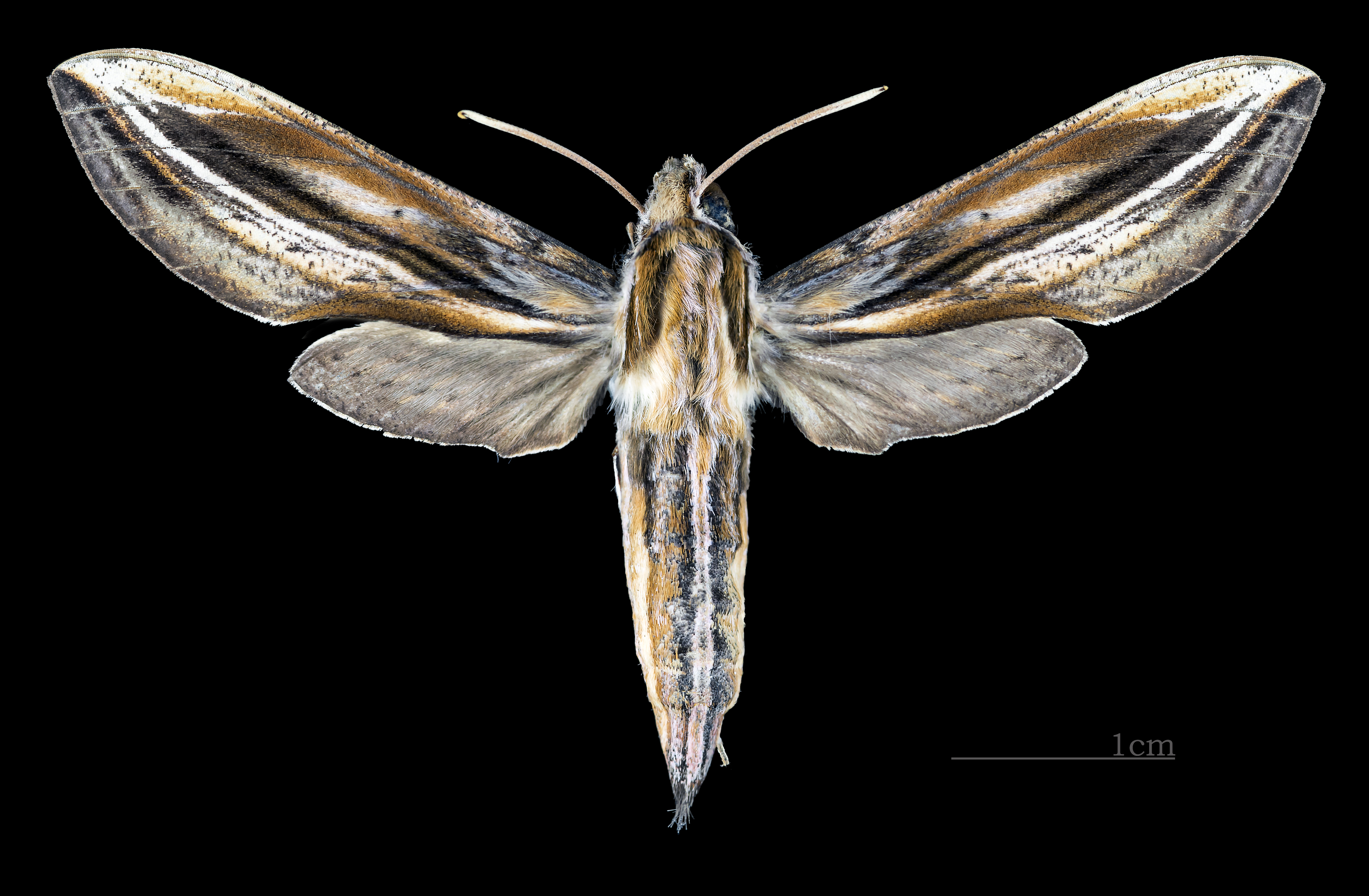
Female, dorsal view

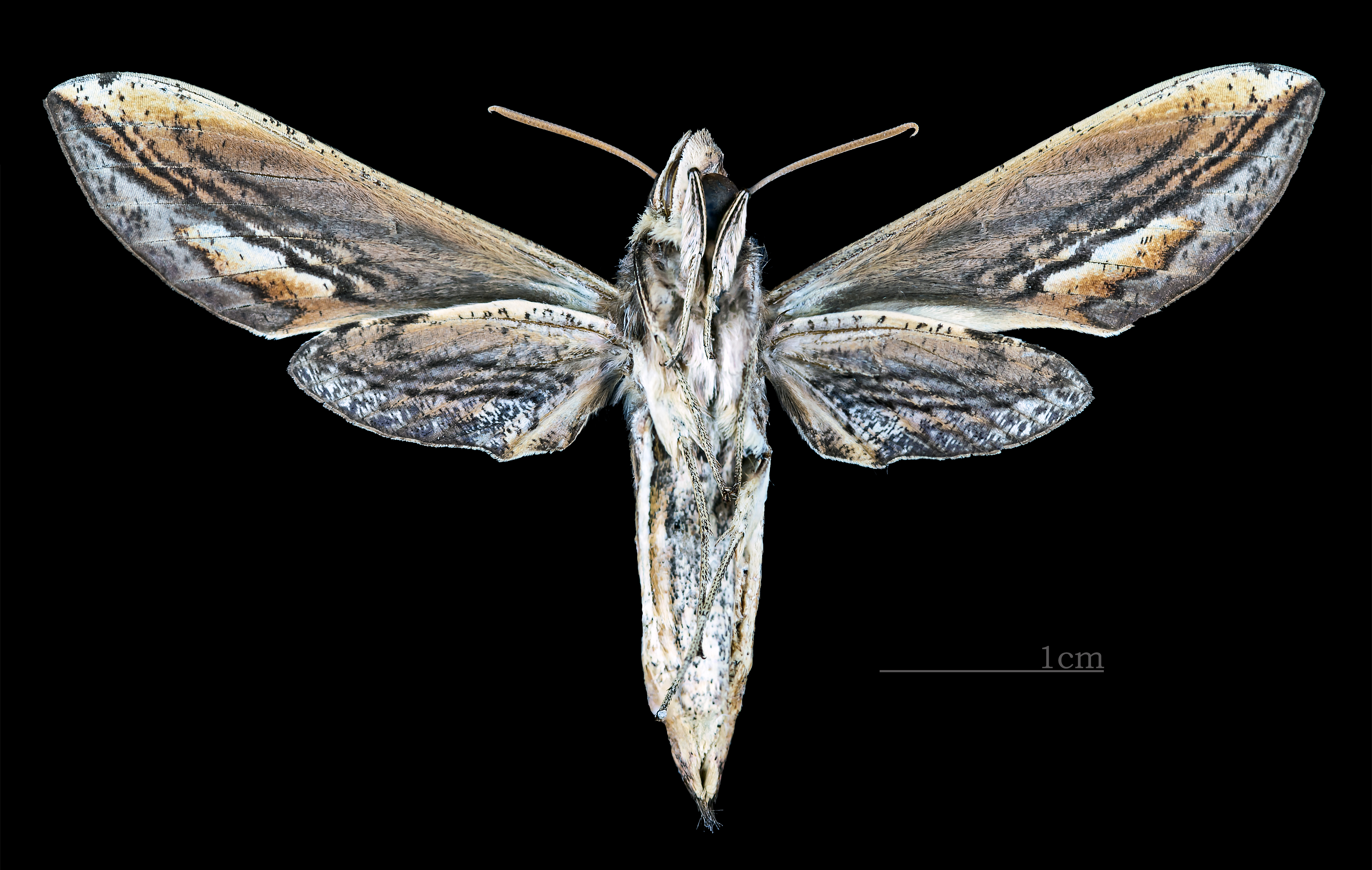
Female, ventral view

== Biology ==
Adults are on wing year round.

== Subspecies ==
- Xylophanes thyelia thyelia (Mexico through Central America to Venezuela, Colombia, Ecuador and Peru and further south into Bolivia, Paraguay and Argentina)
- Xylophanes thyelia salvini (Druce, 1878) (Mexico, Guatemala and Belize)
