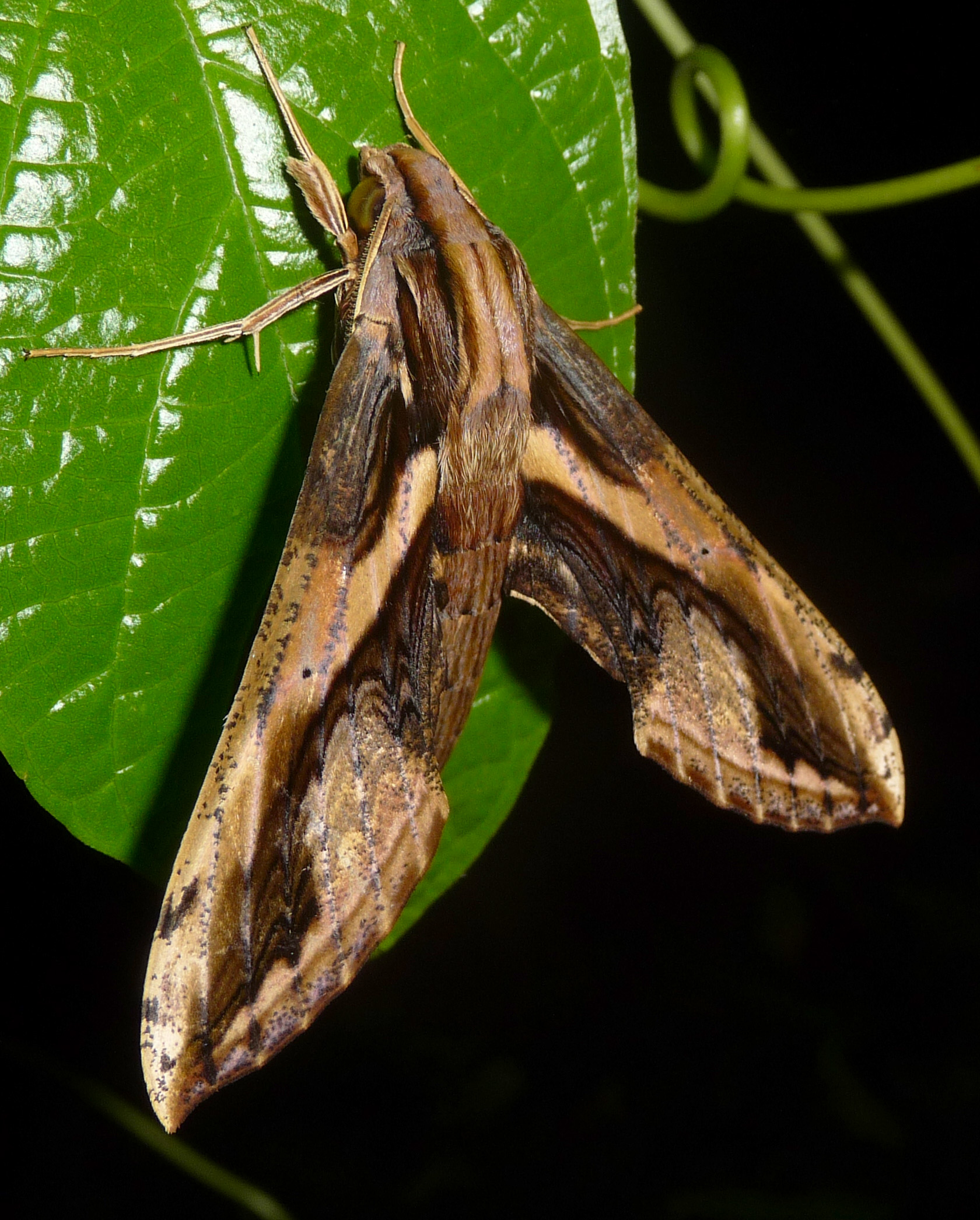

Scientific classification
- Domain: Eukaryota
- Kingdom: Animalia
- Phylum: Arthropoda
- Class: Insecta
- Order: Lepidoptera
- Family: Sphingidae
- Genus: Xylophanes
- Species: X. ceratomioides

Binomial name
- Xylophanes ceratomioides (Grote & Robinson, 1867)

Synonyms
- Anceryx capreolus Schaufuss, 1870; Choerocampa minos Ménétriés, 1857; Pergesa anubus Walker, 1856

= Xylophanes ceratomioides =

Species of moth

Xylophanes ceratomioides is a moth of the family Sphingidae. It is known from Mexico, Belize, Costa Rica, French Guiana, Bolivia, Argentina and Venezuela, down into southern Brazil. Rare vagrants have been found up to southern Arizona.

== Description ==
The wingspan is 86–96 mm. The outer margin of the forewing is slightly scalloped. There are long, narrow, whitish scales on the upperside of the abdomen. The base of the forewing upperside is dark, often almost black but with an off-white patch on the inner edge. The costa has several conspicuous subapical and apical black spots, the largest subapical spot is triangular with the inner point directed basally. The subbasal band of the hindwing upperside is off-white, divided medially into two patches by a longitudinal black band.

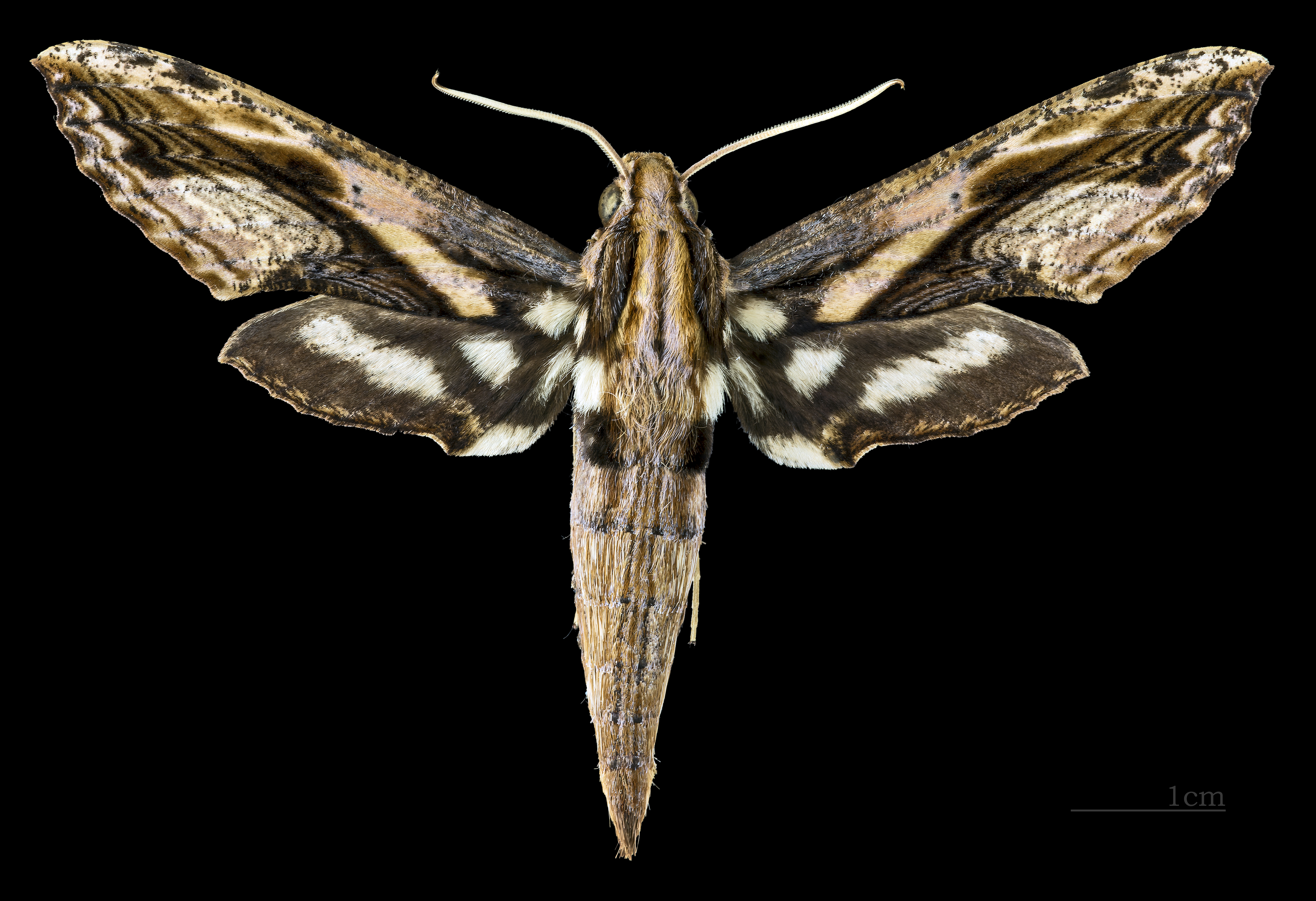
Male dorsal MHNT

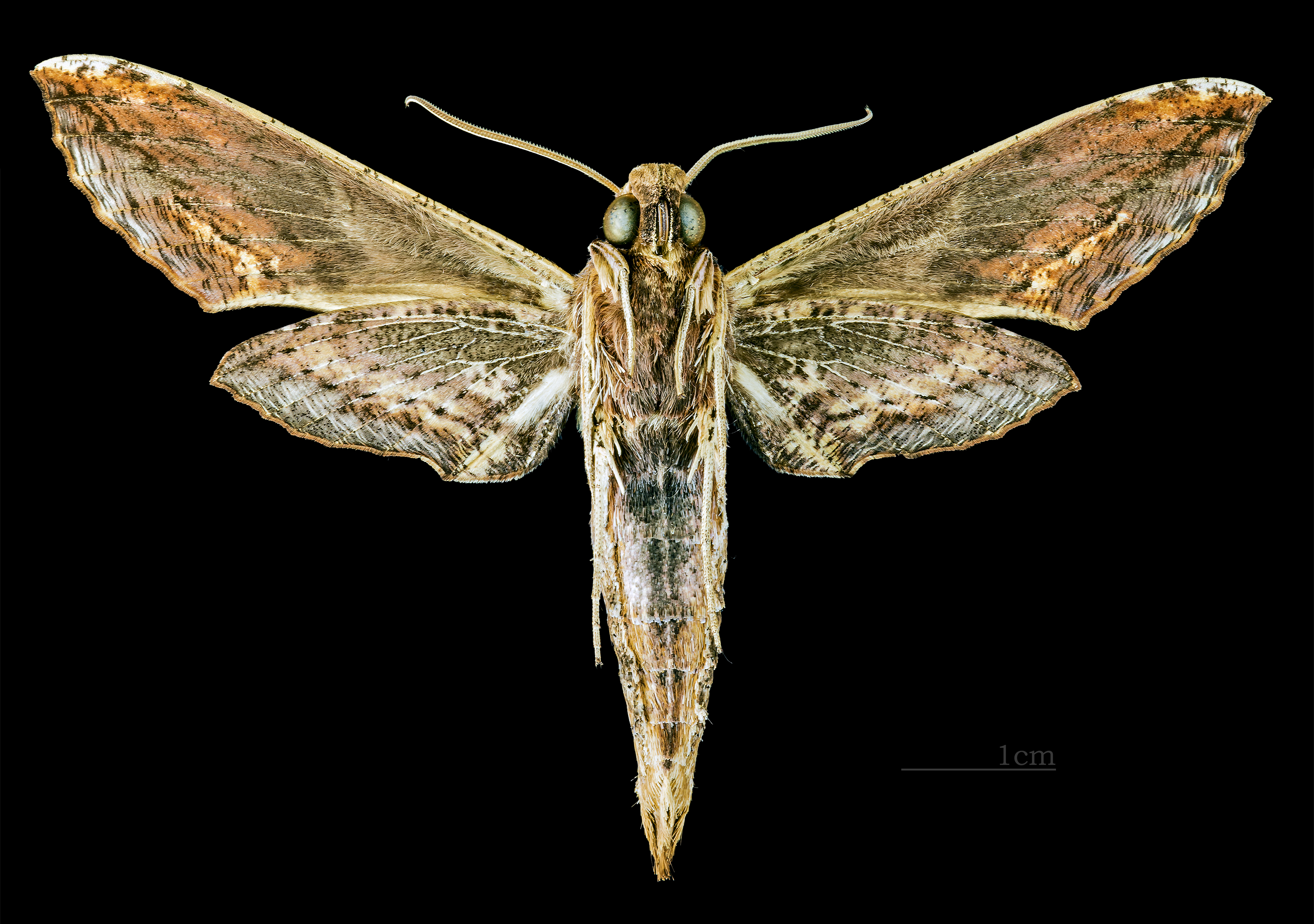
Male ventral MHNT

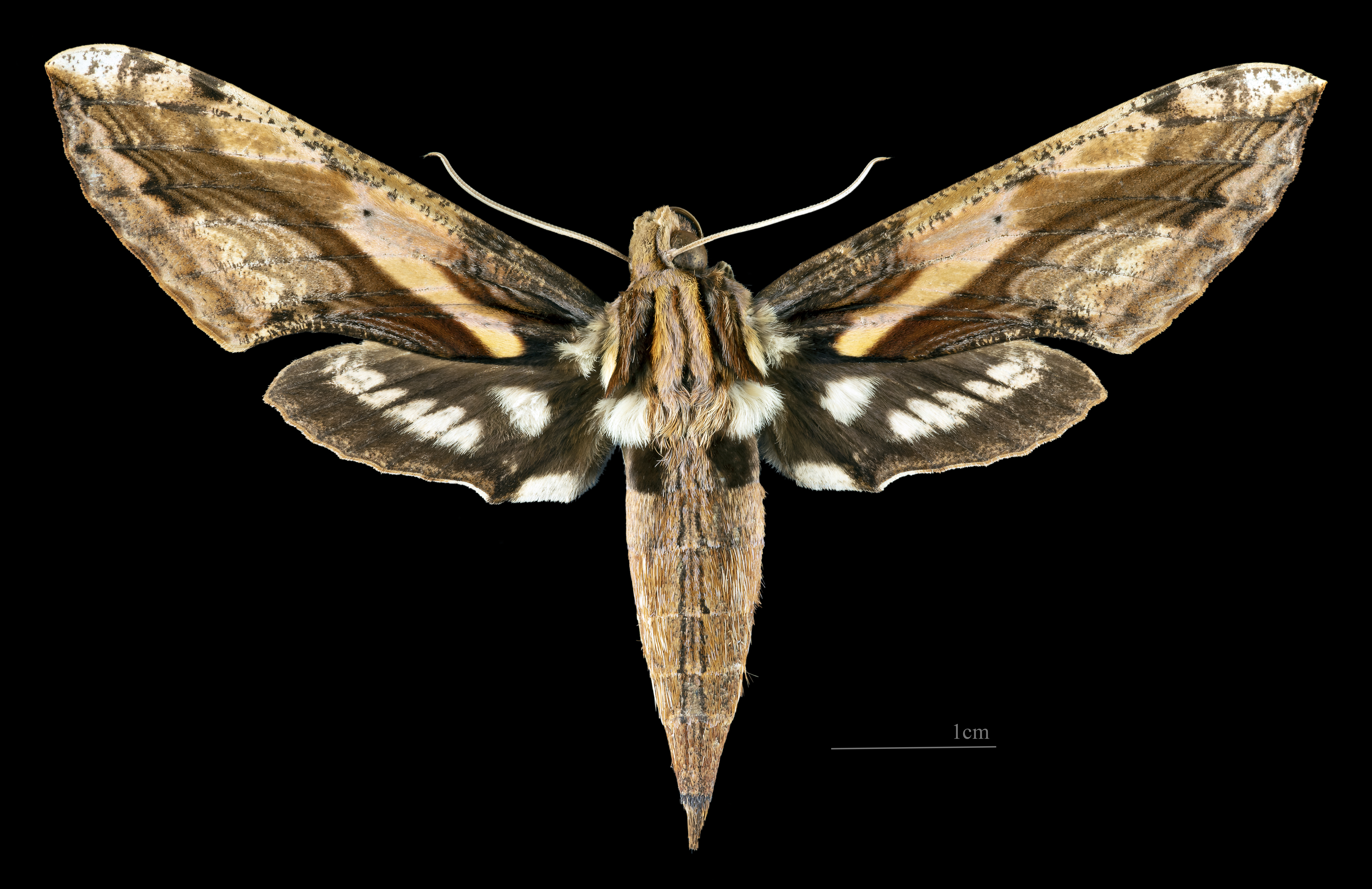
Female dorsal MHNT

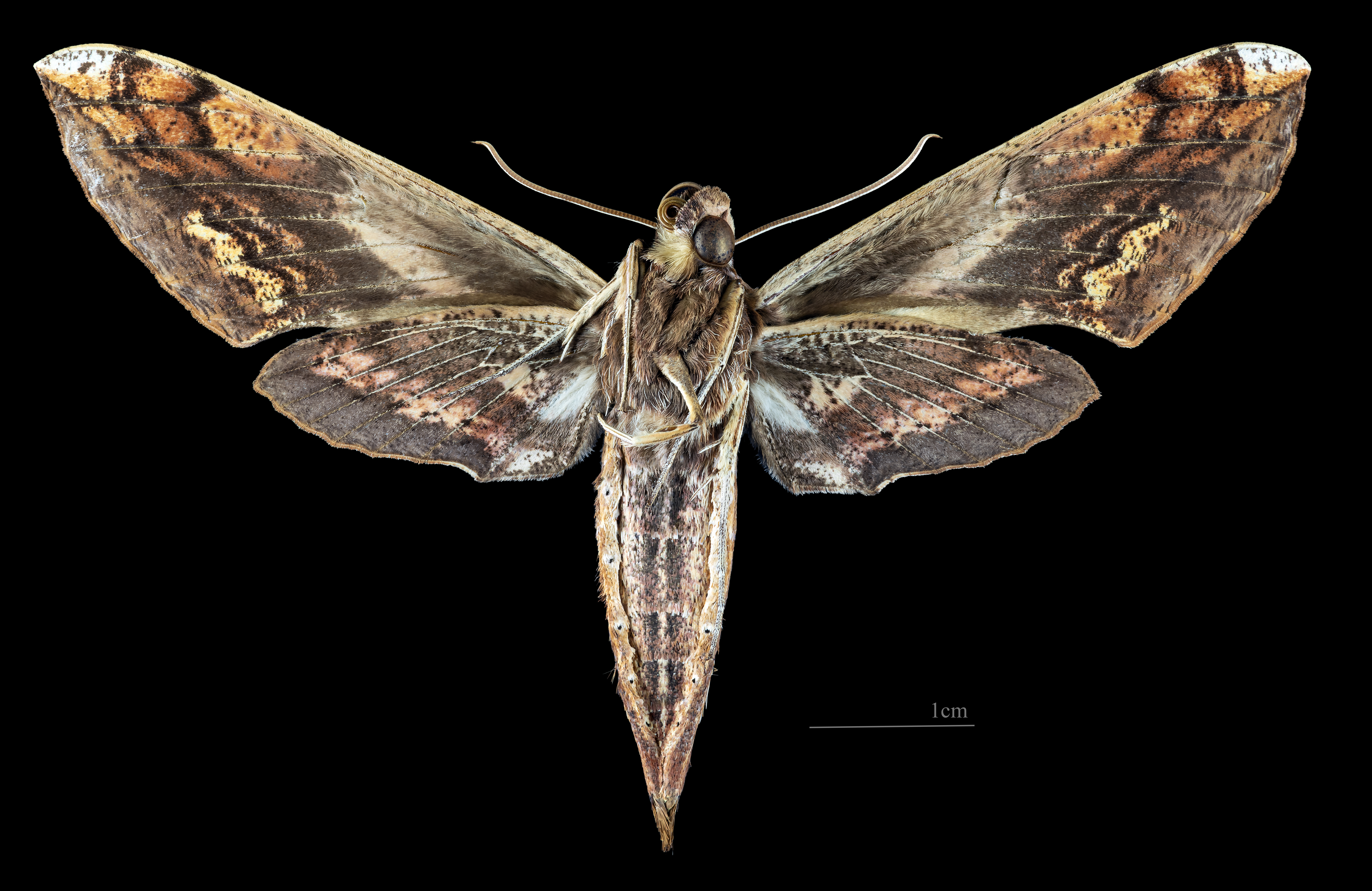
Female ventral MHNT

== Biology ==
Adults are on wing year-round in Costa Rica. In Peru, there are at least three generations per year with adults on wing from January to February, June to July and October.

The larvae feed on Psychotria berteriana, Psychotria correae, Psychotria microdon and Hamelia patens.
