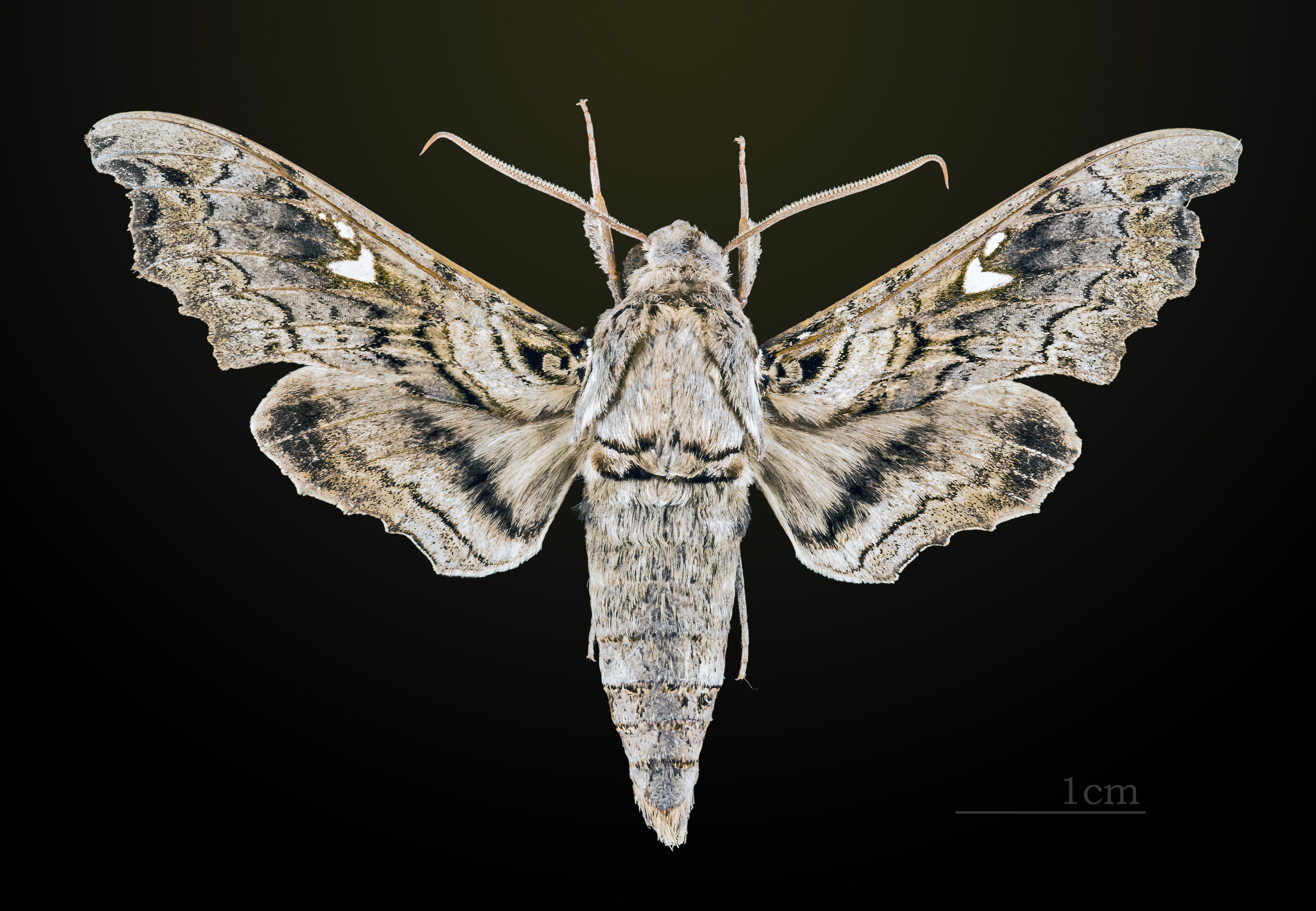
- Dorsal view, male
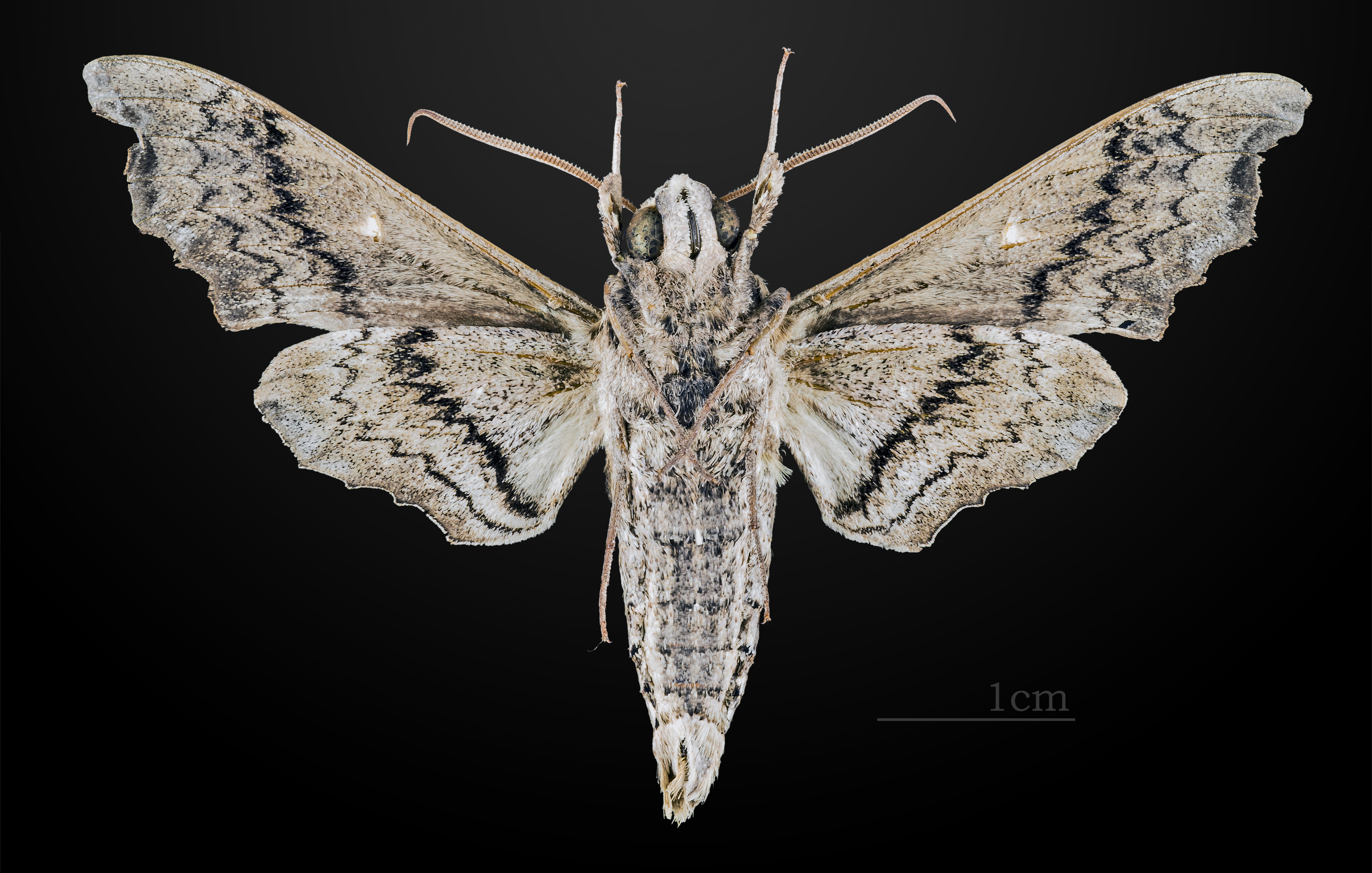
- Ventral view, male

Conservation status
- Vulnerable (NatureServe)

Scientific classification
- Kingdom: Animalia
- Phylum: Arthropoda
- Clade: Pancrustacea
- Class: Insecta
- Order: Lepidoptera
- Family: Sphingidae
- Genus: Madoryx
- Species: M. pseudothyreus

Binomial name
- Madoryx pseudothyreus (Grote, 1865)

Synonyms
- Hemeroplanes pseudothyreus Grote, 1865

= Madoryx pseudothyreus =

False-windowed sphinx

Species of moth

Madoryx pseudothyreus, the false-windowed sphinx, is a moth of the family Sphingidae. The species was first described by Augustus Radcliffe Grote in 1865. It is known from the tip of Florida down to Cuba and the surrounding West Indies.

The wingspan is 66–70 mm. There is a small olive-green basal patch on the forewing upperside which is separated into two spots. There is a brown marginal band on the forewing underside.

There are multiple generations per year. Adults feed on the nectar of various flowers, including Asystasia gangetica.

The larvae have been recorded feeding on Avicennia germinans. Pupation takes place in cocoons spun amongst leaf litter.
