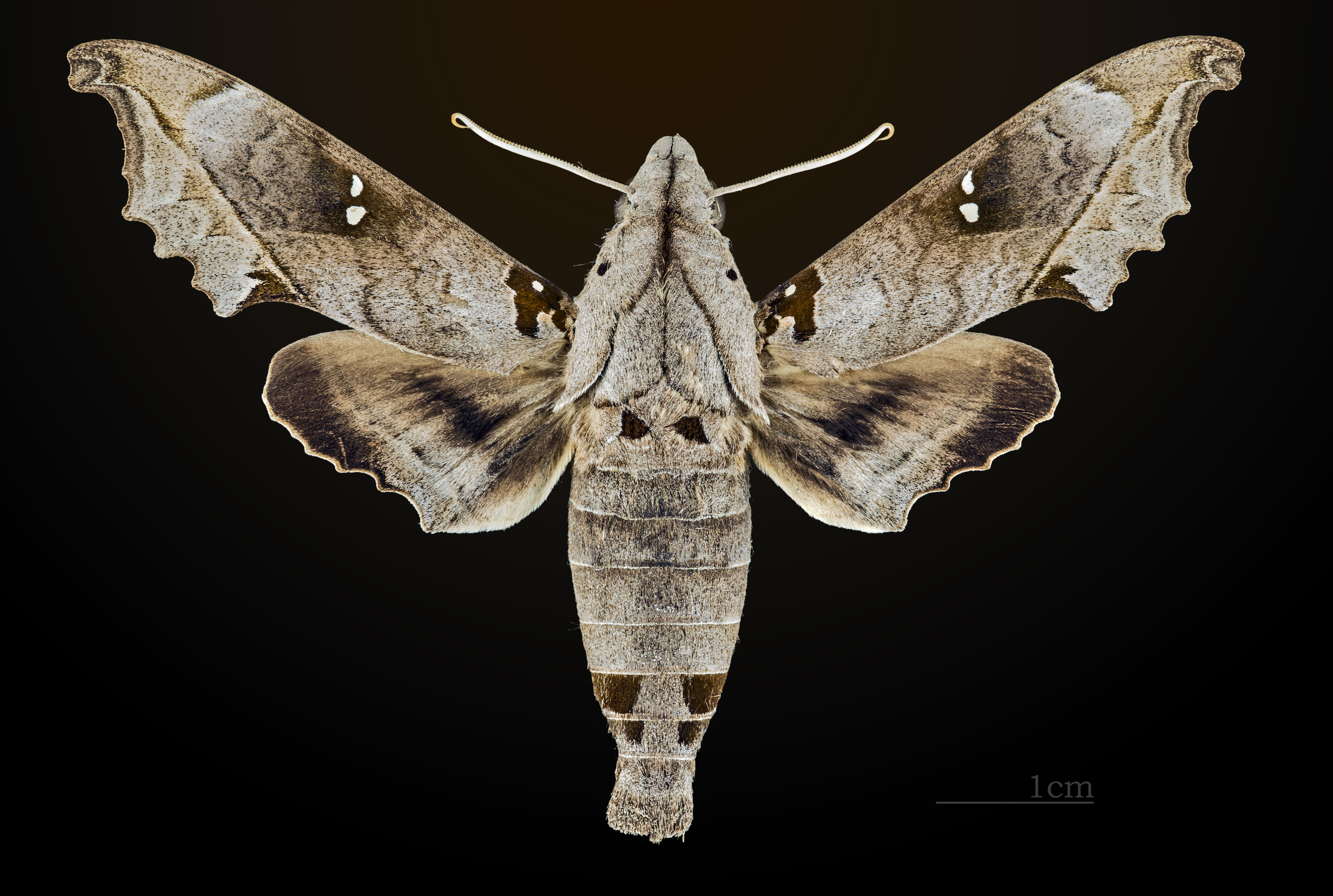
- Madoryx oiclus, male

Scientific classification
- Domain: Eukaryota
- Kingdom: Animalia
- Phylum: Arthropoda
- Class: Insecta
- Order: Lepidoptera
- Family: Sphingidae
- Genus: Madoryx
- Species: M. oiclus

Binomial name
- Madoryx oiclus Cramer, 1780

Synonyms
- Sphinx oiclus Cramer, 1780; Madoryx faunus Boisduval, 1875; Madoryx oiclus jamaicensis Neidhoefer, 1968

= Madoryx oiclus =

Species of moth

Madoryx oiclus is a moth of the family Sphingidae. It is known from Suriname, French Guiana and from Venezuela to Costa Rica. It has also been recorded in Paraguay, Argentina and Bolivia.

== Description ==
The wingspan is 76–93 mm.

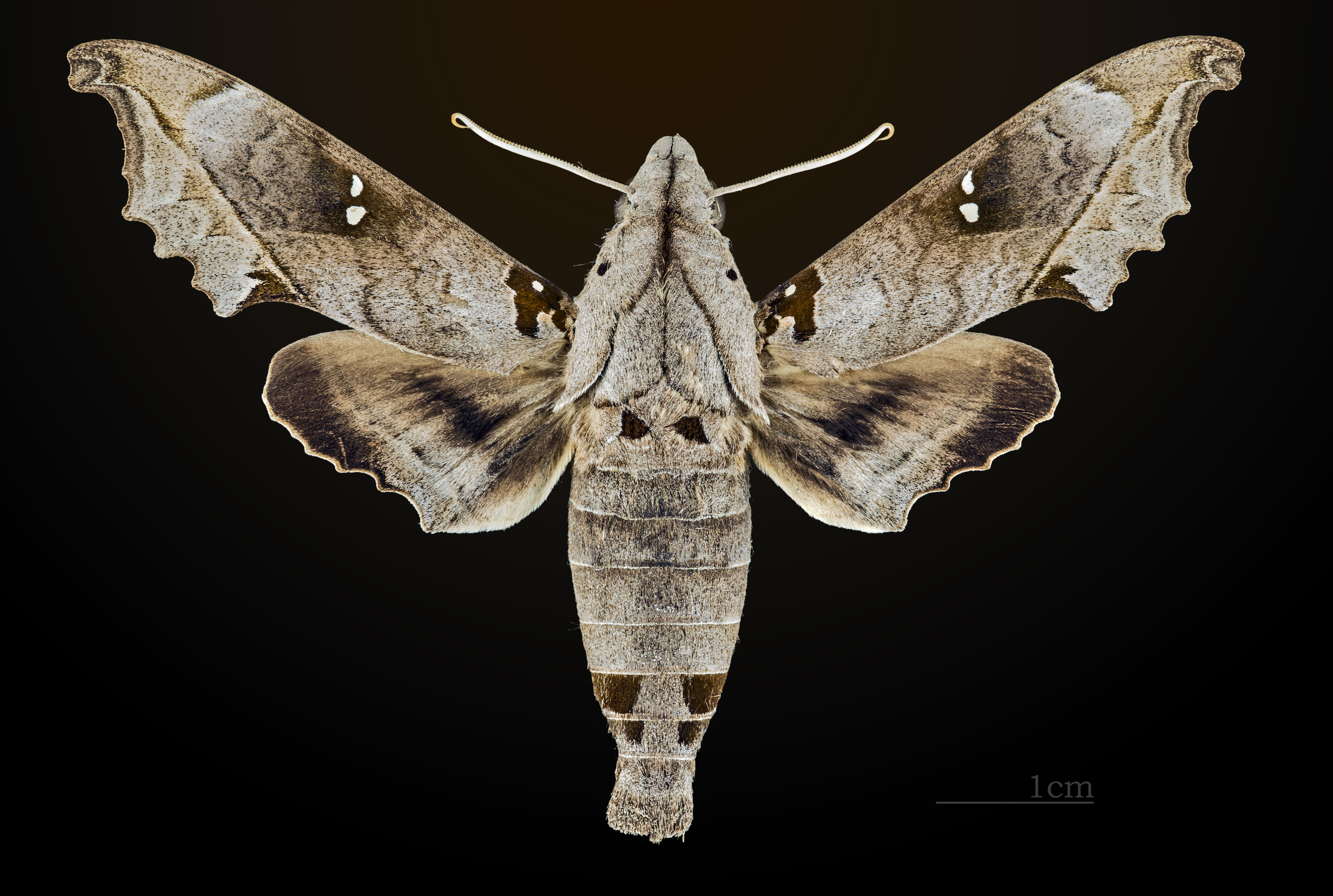
Male dorsal MHNT

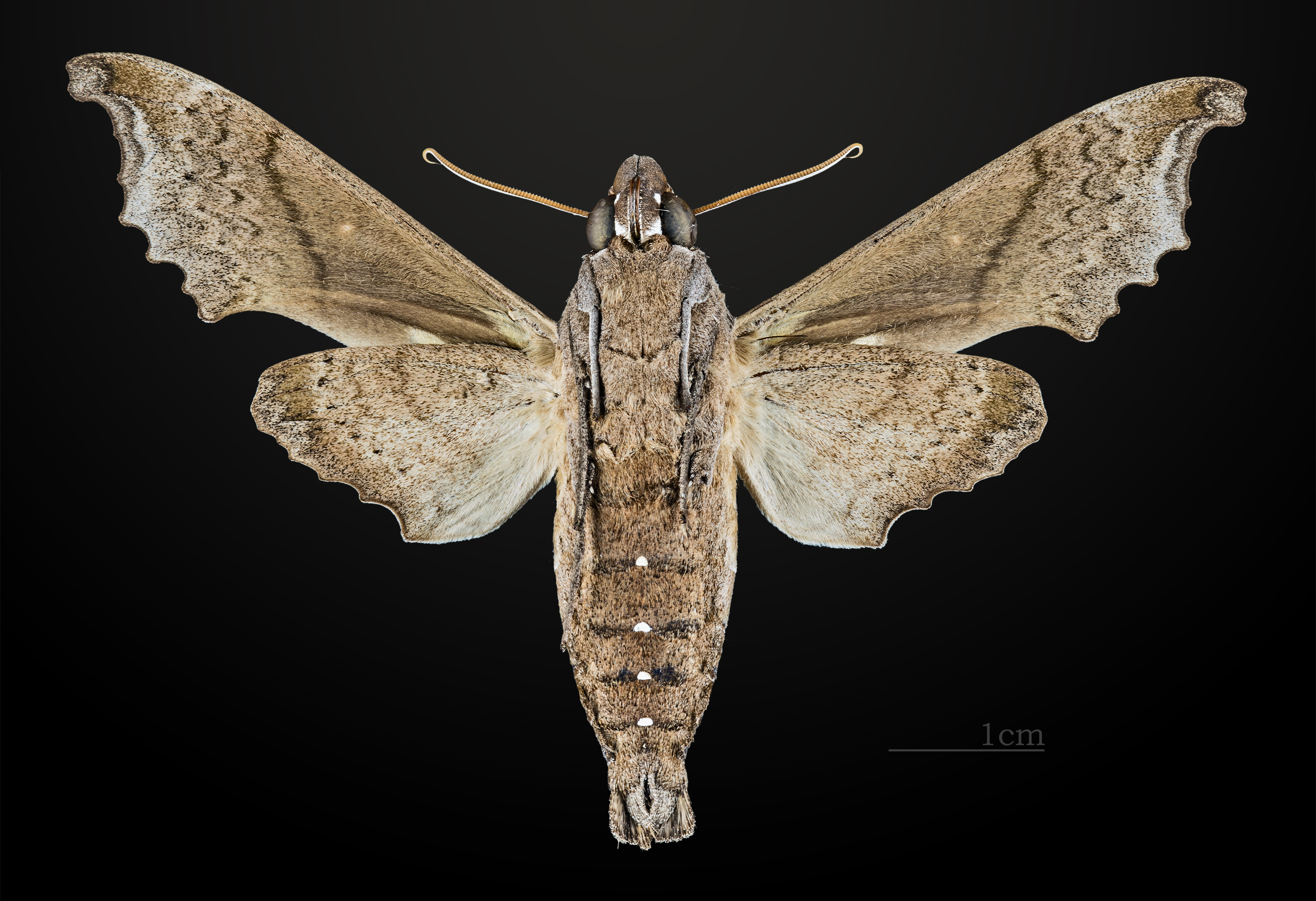
Male ventral MHNT

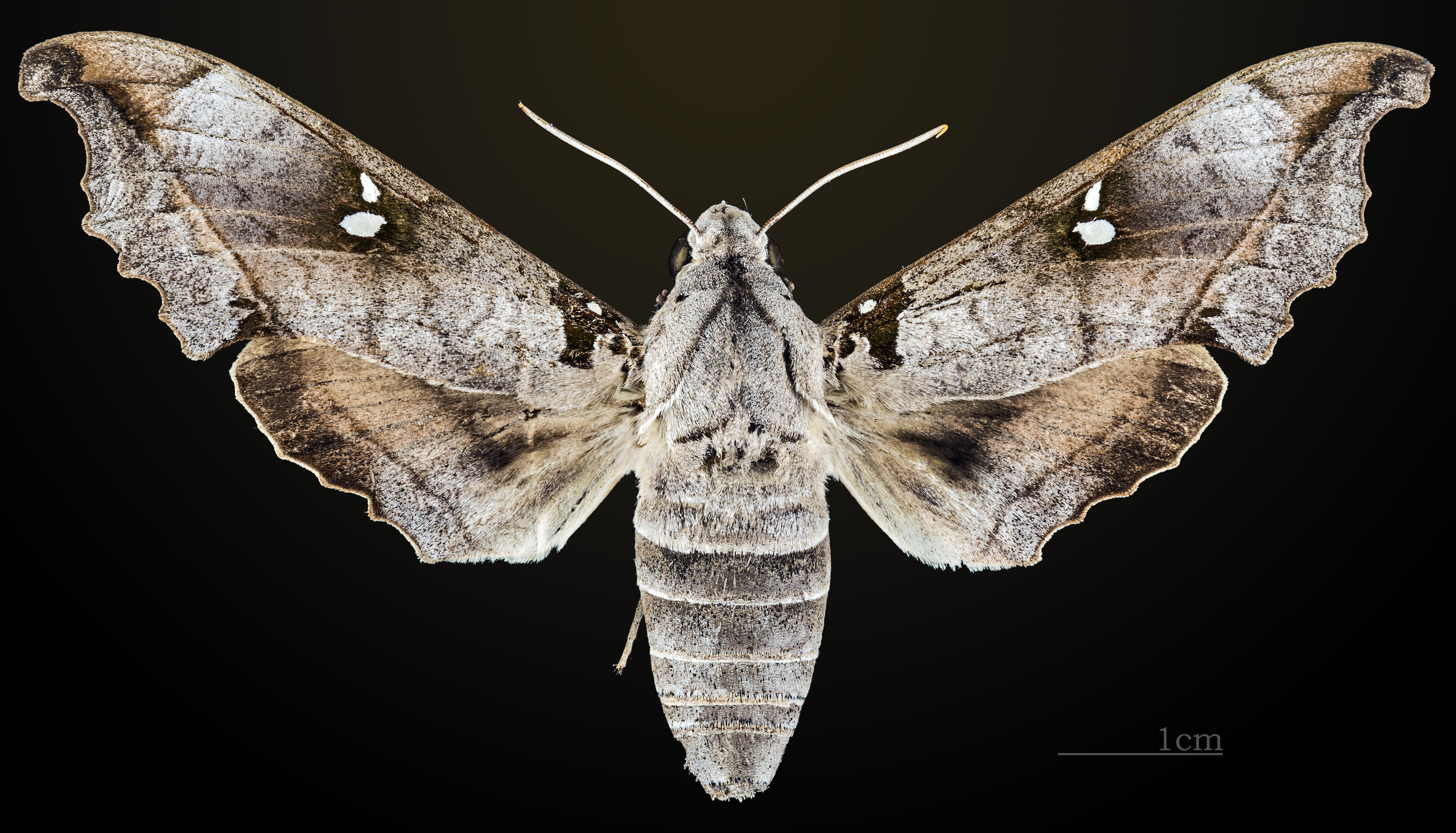
Female dorsal MHNT

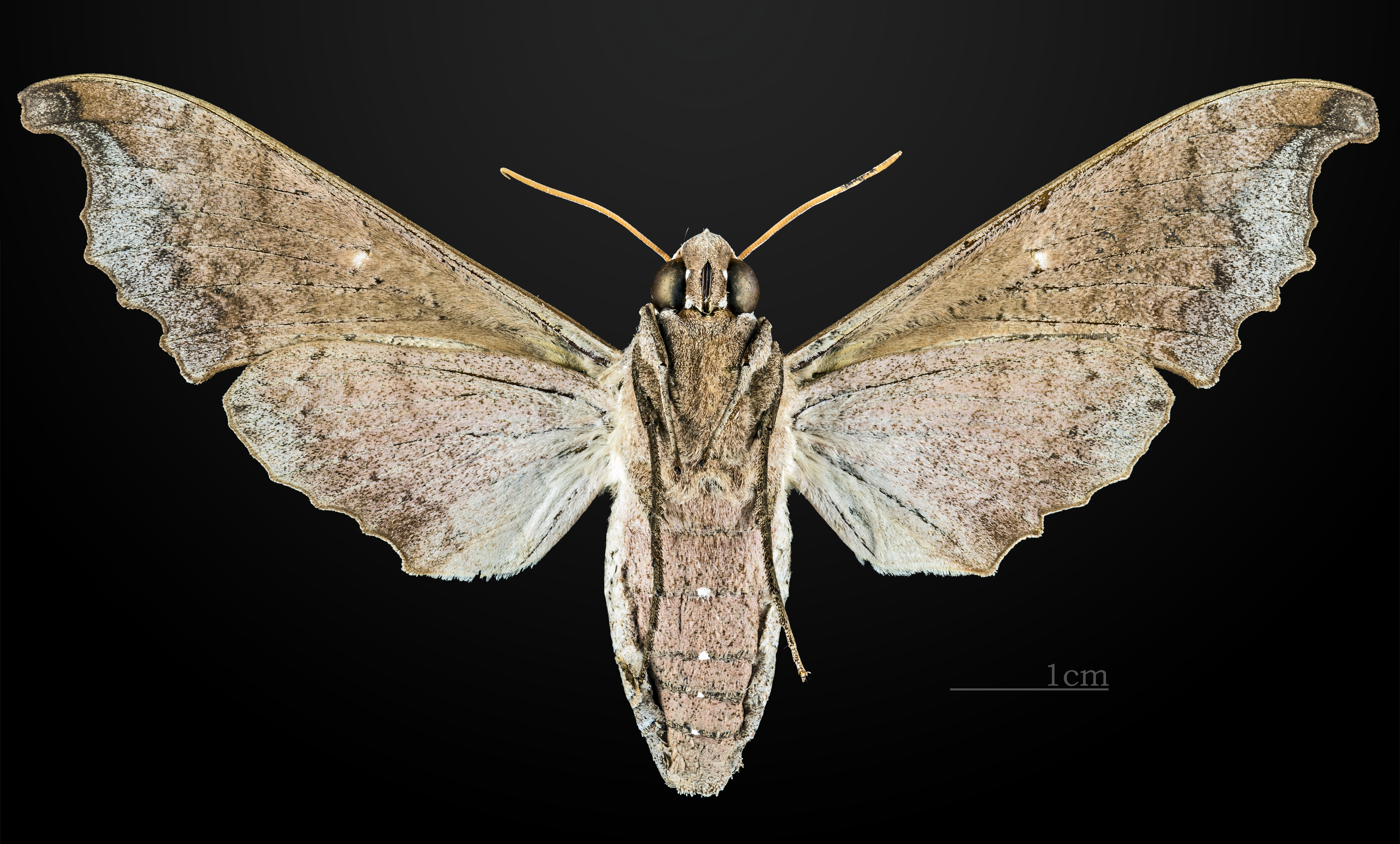
Female ventral MHNT

== Subspecies ==
- Madoryx oiclus oiclus (Paraguay, Argentina and Bolivia, Suriname, French Guiana and from Venezuela to Costa Rica)
- Madoryx oiclus jamicensis Neidhoefer, 1968 (Jamaica)
