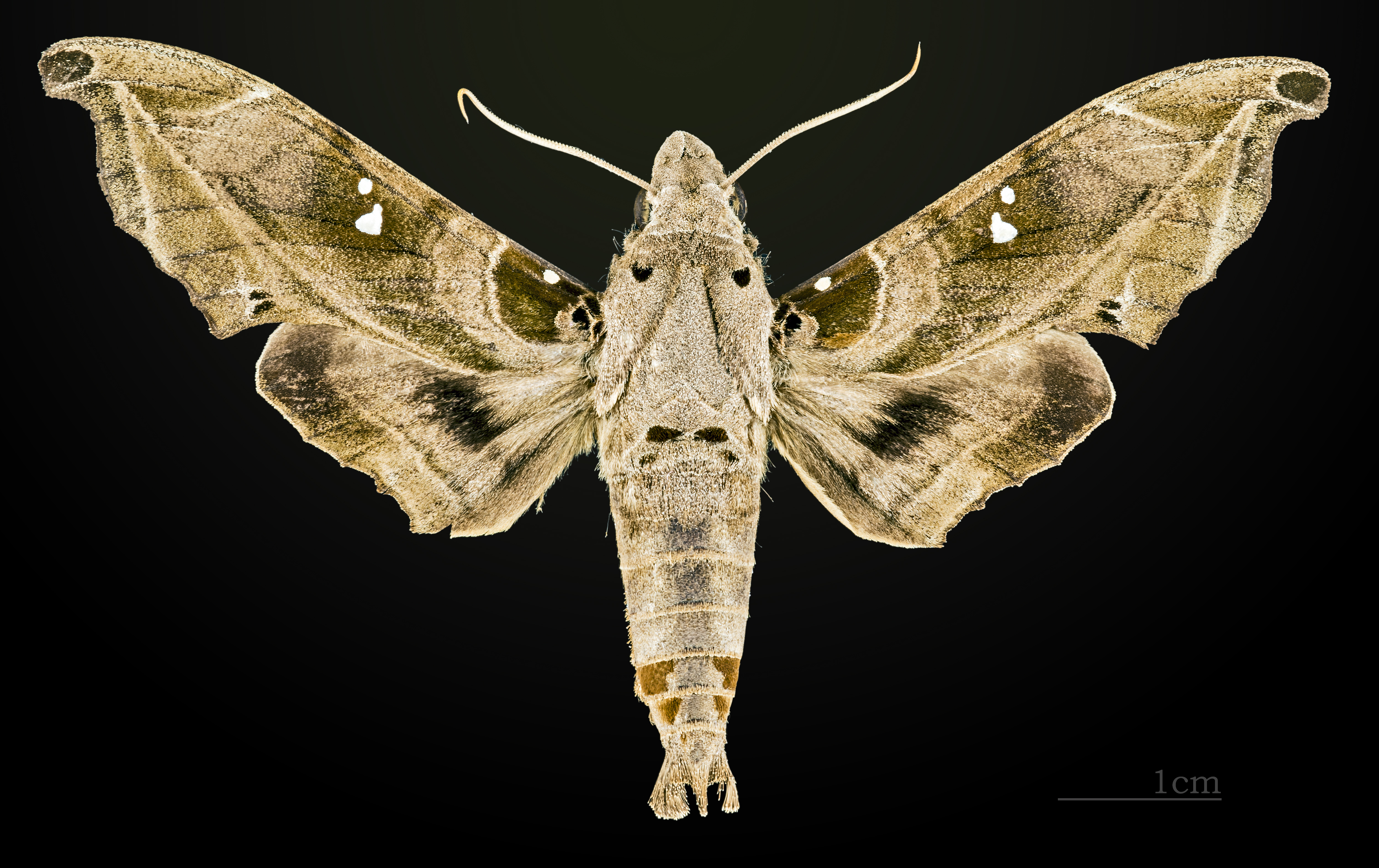
- Madoryx bubastus ♂ MHNT
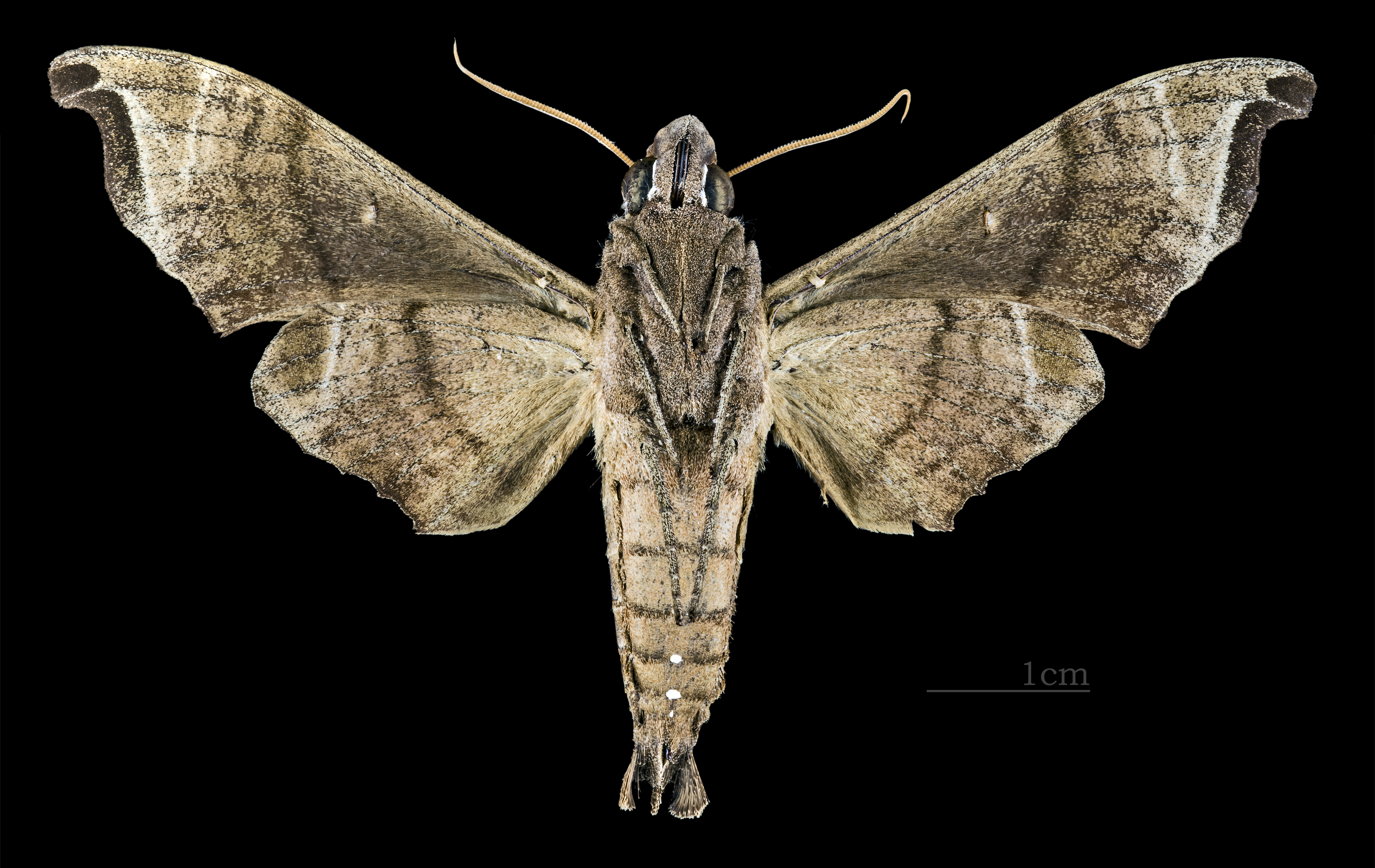
- Madoryx bubastus ♂ △ MHNT

Scientific classification
- Domain: Eukaryota
- Kingdom: Animalia
- Phylum: Arthropoda
- Class: Insecta
- Order: Lepidoptera
- Family: Sphingidae
- Genus: Madoryx
- Species: M. bubastus

Binomial name
- Madoryx bubastus (Cramer, 1777)

Synonyms
- Sphinx bubastus Cramer, 1777; Madoryx lyncus Boisduval, 1875; Aleuron bubastus butleri Kirby, 1877

= Madoryx bubastus =

Species of moth

Madoryx bubastus is a moth of the family Sphingidae. It is found in Central America (including Costa Rica and Guatemala) and South America, including French Guiana and Venezuela south to at least Bolivia and Argentina. It is also present in Mexico.

The wingspan is 92–120 mm.

Adults are probably on wing year round.

The larvae have been recorded feeding on Guettarda macrosperma.

== Subspecies ==
- Madoryx bubastus bubastus
- Madoryx bubastus butleri (Kirby, 1877) (Mexico, Guatemala and Belize)
