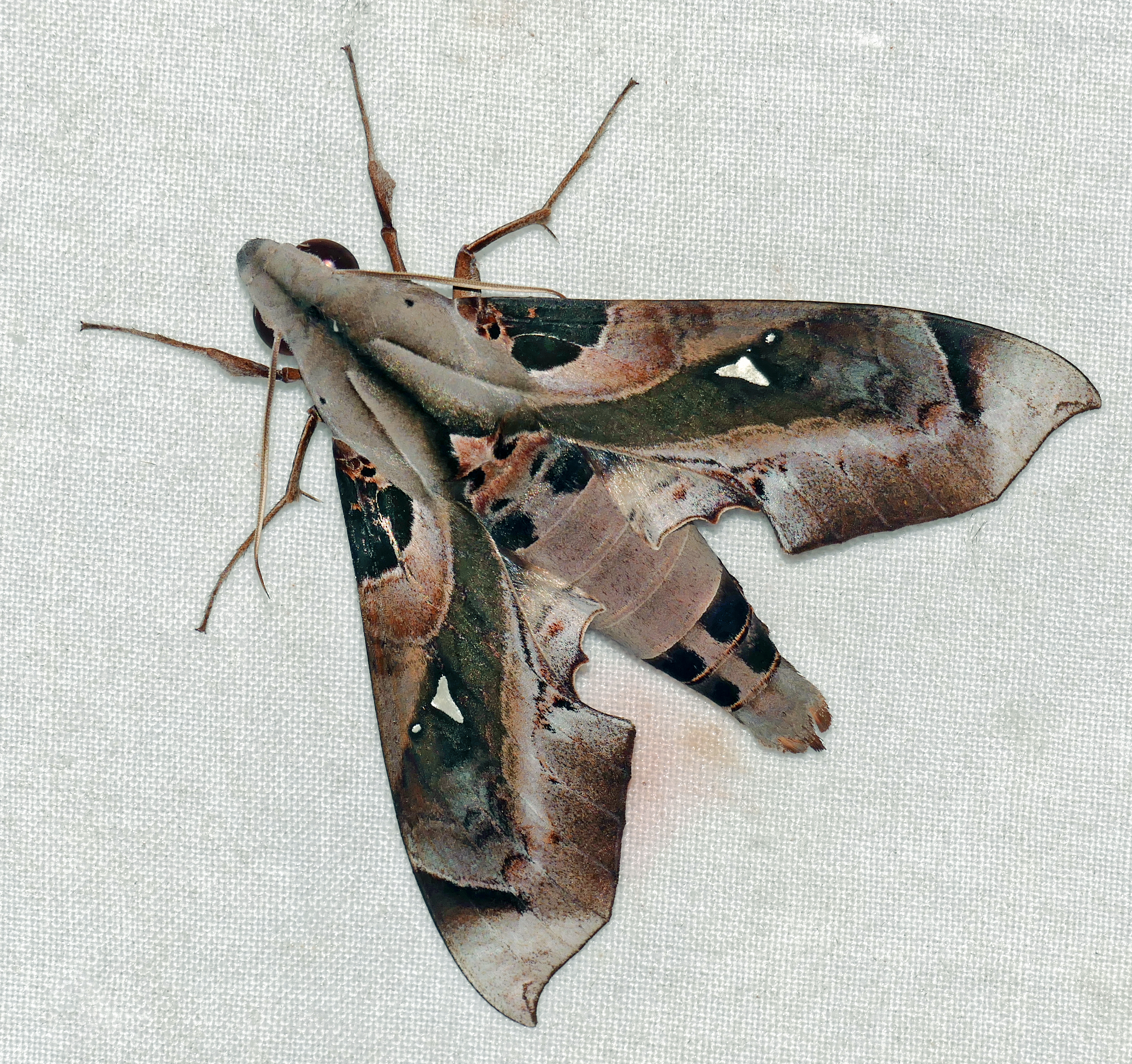
- Madoryx plutonius plutonius male

Scientific classification
- Kingdom: Animalia
- Phylum: Arthropoda
- Clade: Pancrustacea
- Class: Insecta
- Order: Lepidoptera
- Family: Sphingidae
- Genus: Madoryx
- Species: M. plutonius

Binomial name
- Madoryx plutonius (Hubner, 1819)

Synonyms
- Sphinx pluto Cramer, 1779; Madoryx deborrei Boisduval, 1875; Hemeroplanes plutonius Hübner, 1819

= Madoryx plutonius =

Species of moth

Madoryx plutonius is a moth of the family Sphingidae.

== Distribution ==
It is known from Suriname, Venezuela, French Guiana, Ecuador, Peru, Bolivia, Brazil, Argentina, Paraguay, Costa Rica Colombia and Guatemala. It is probably also present in Panama, and Guyana. Subspecies dentatus is found in Mexico and Belize.

== Description ==
The wingspan is 92–120 mm. It differs from all other Madoryx species in the acute forewing apex. There is a minute, circular, upper silver spot and an elongate, triangular lower silver spot on the forewing upperside.

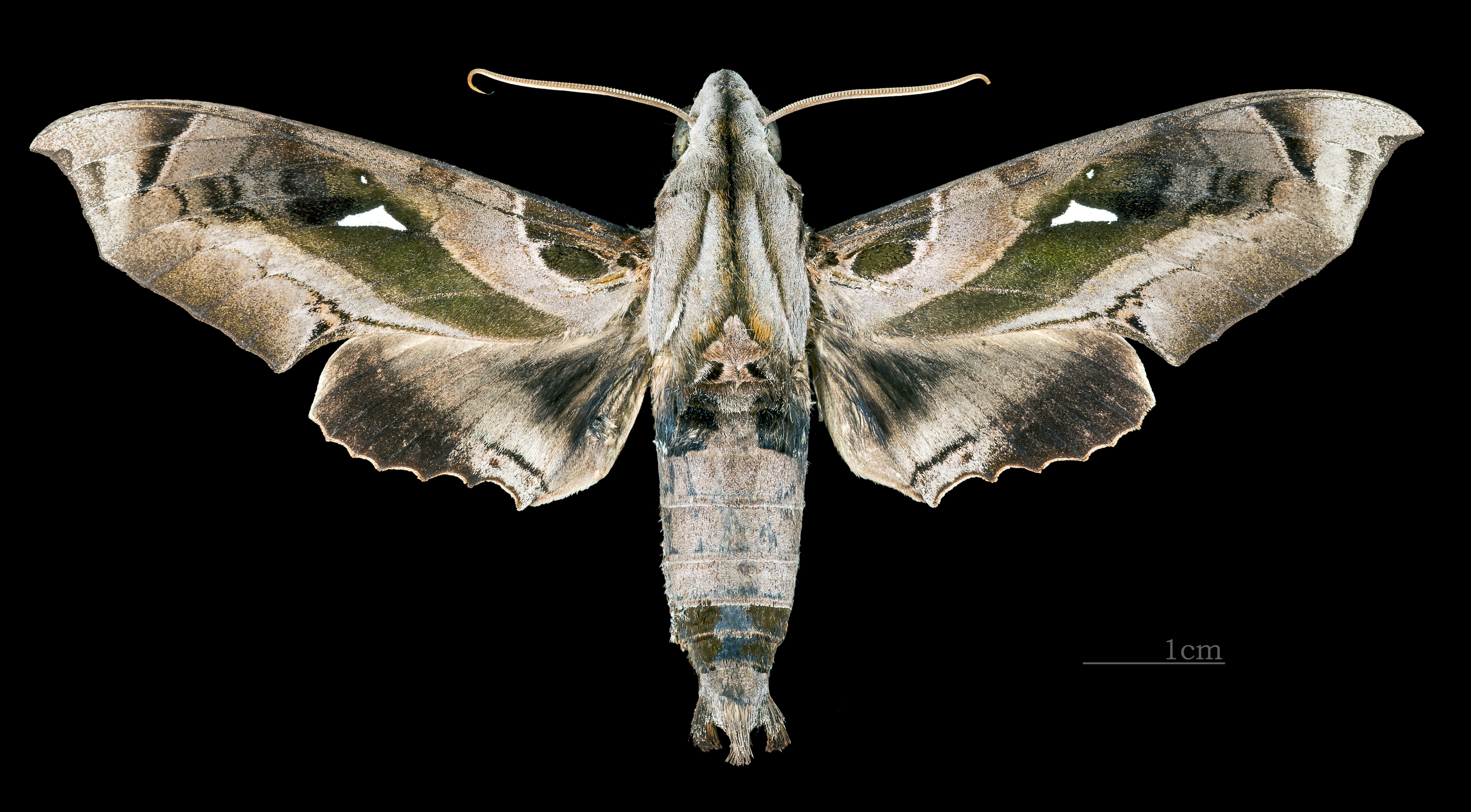
Male dorsal

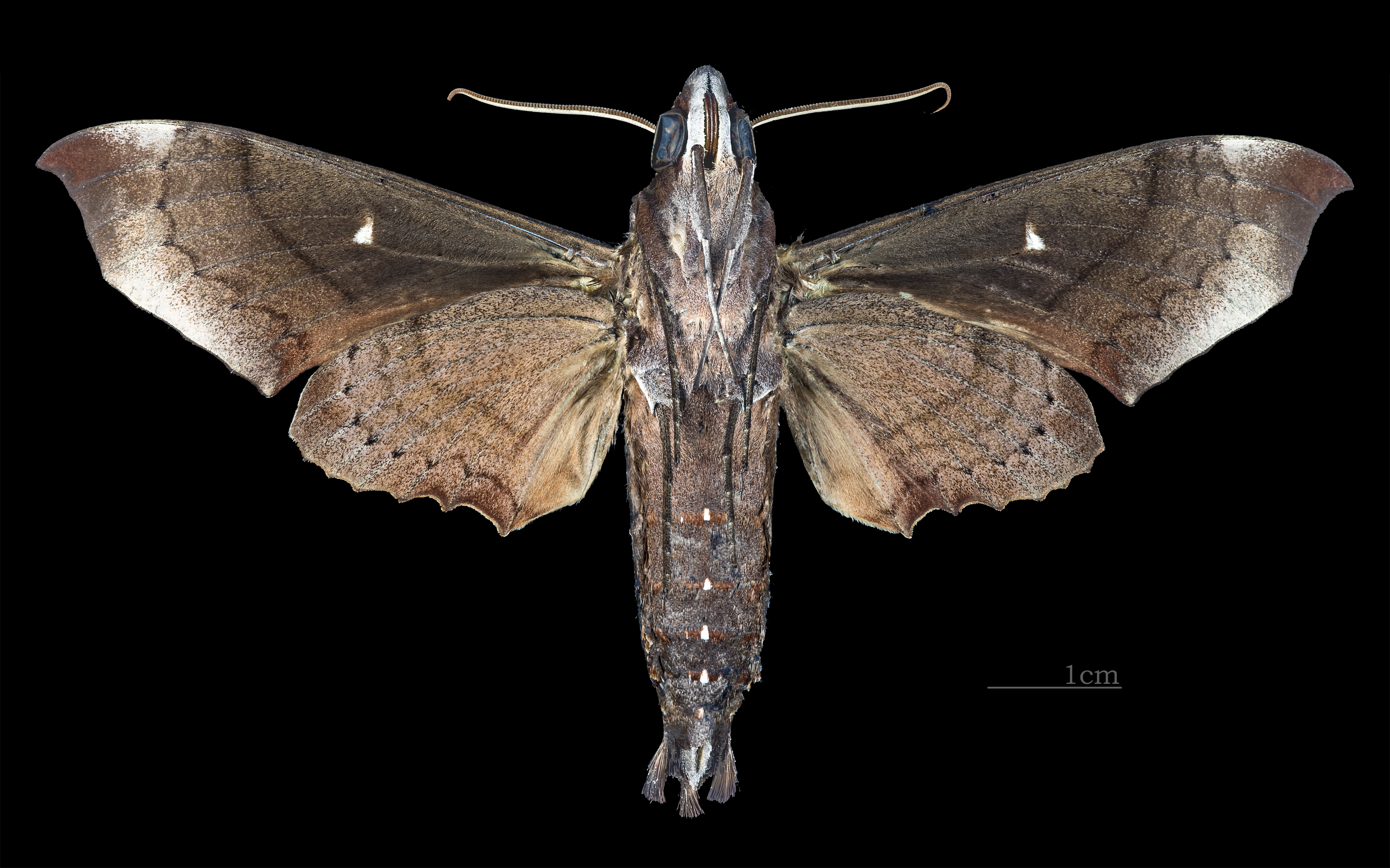
Male ventral

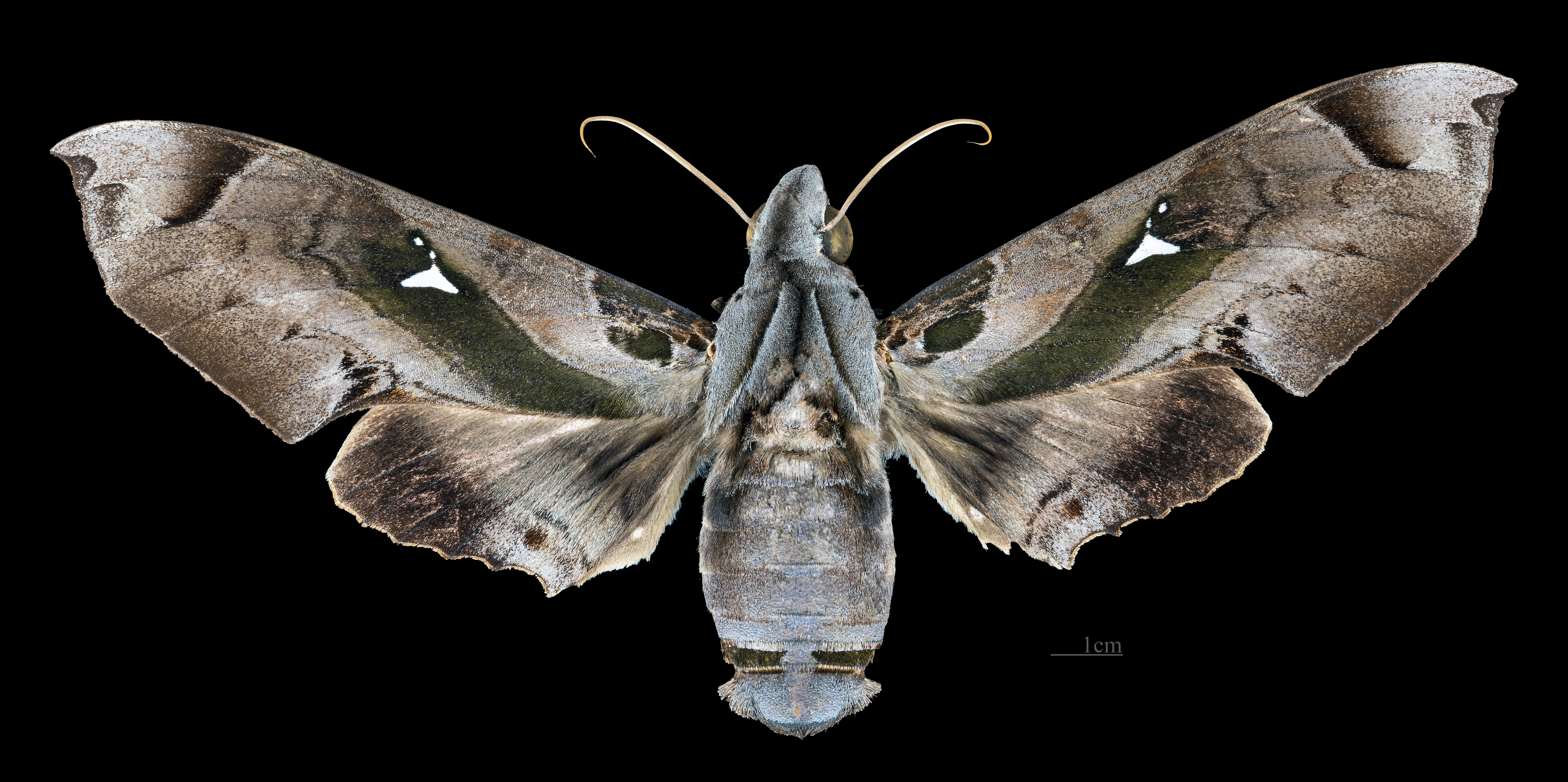
Female dorsal

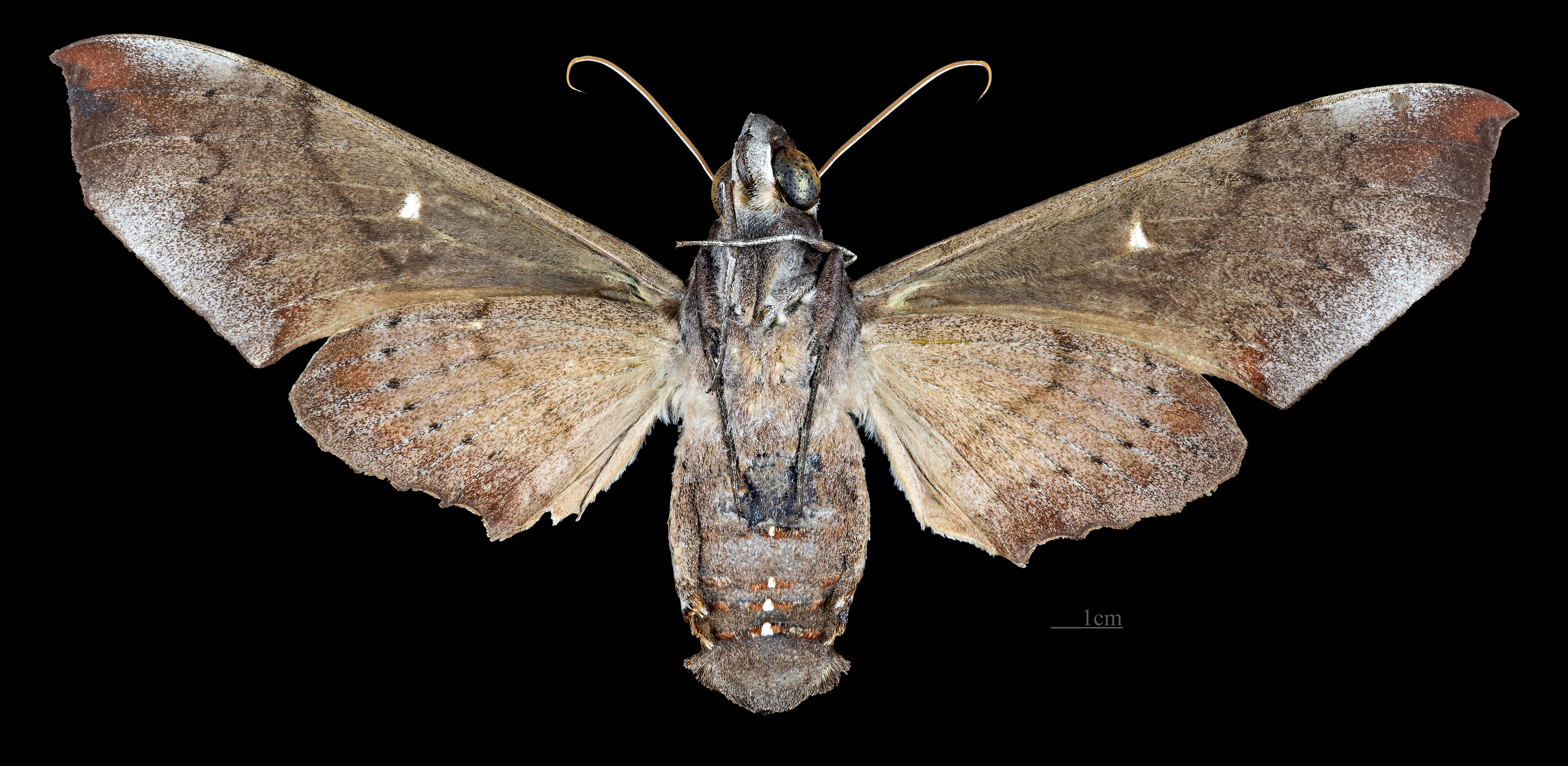
Female ventral

== Biology ==
Adults are on wing year round.

The larvae have been recorded feeding on Conostegia xalapensis and found feeding on Yemeri (Vochysia hondurensis) in Belize. Pupation takes place in a loose cocoon of yellow silk and leaves. The pupa is dark chocolate brown.

== Subspecies ==
- Madoryx plutonius plutonius
- Madoryx plutonius dentatus Gehlen, 1931 (Mexico Colombia and Belize)
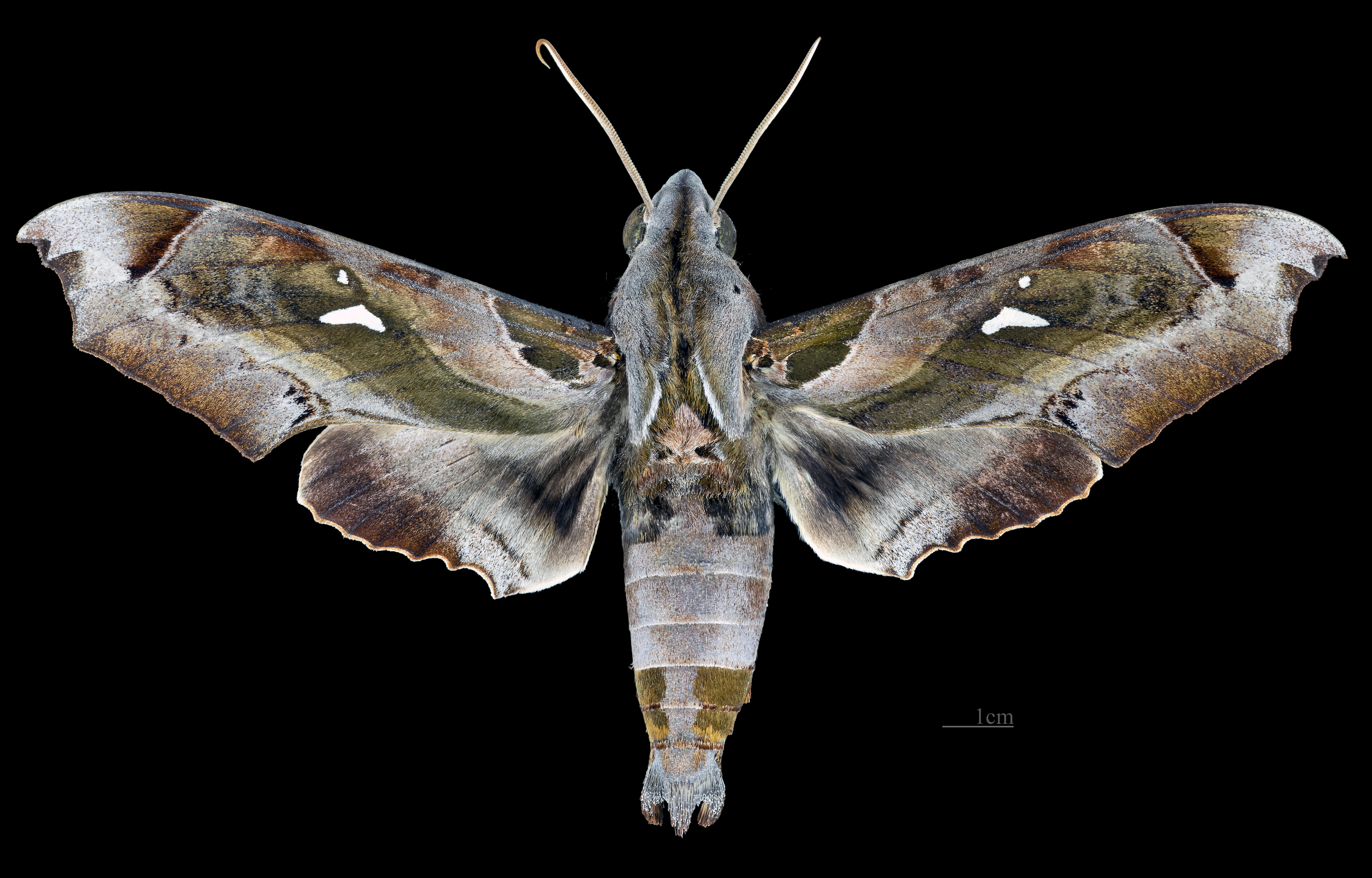
Madoryx plutonius dentatus Male dorsal

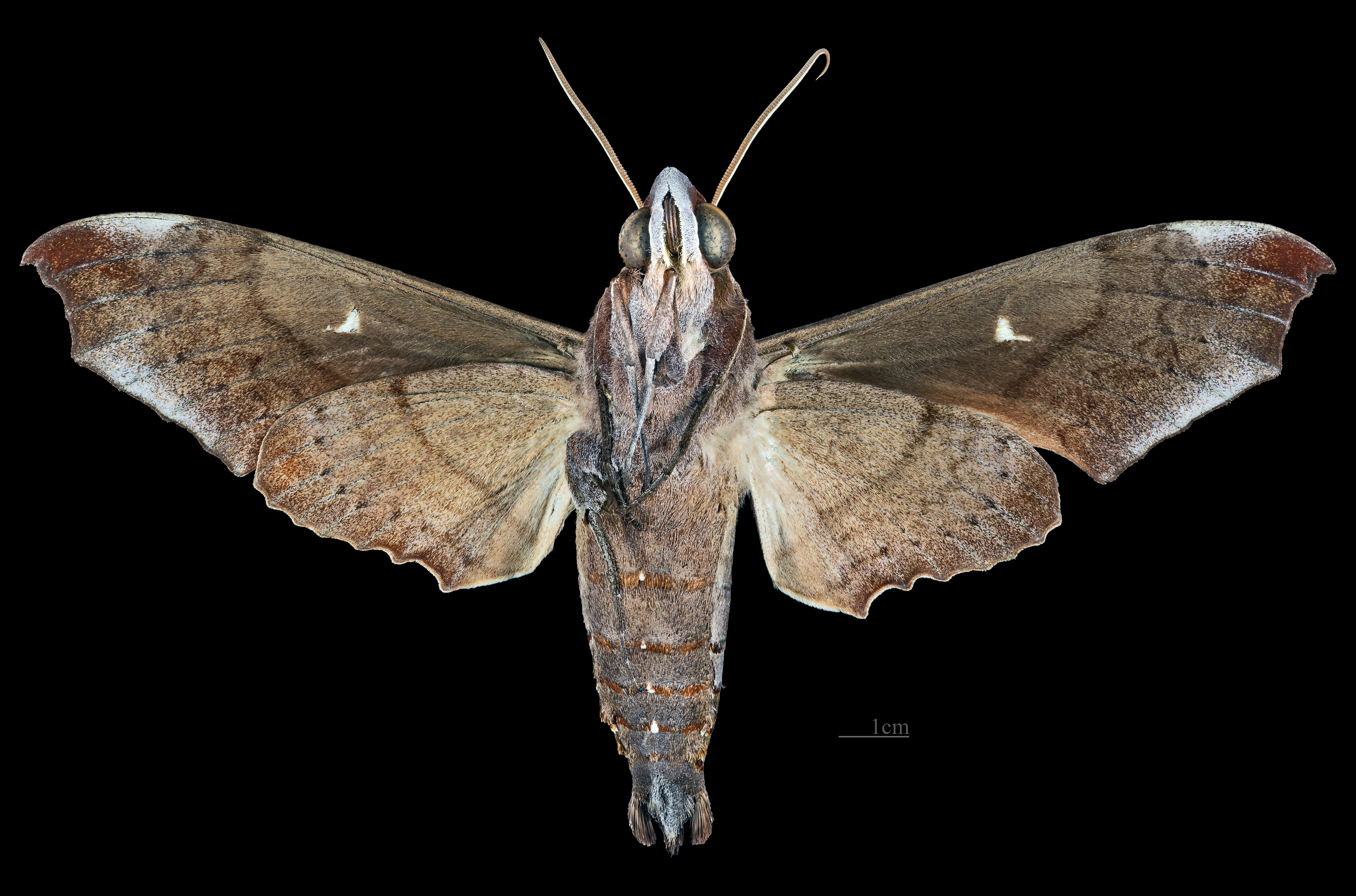
Madoryx plutonius dentatus Male ventral
