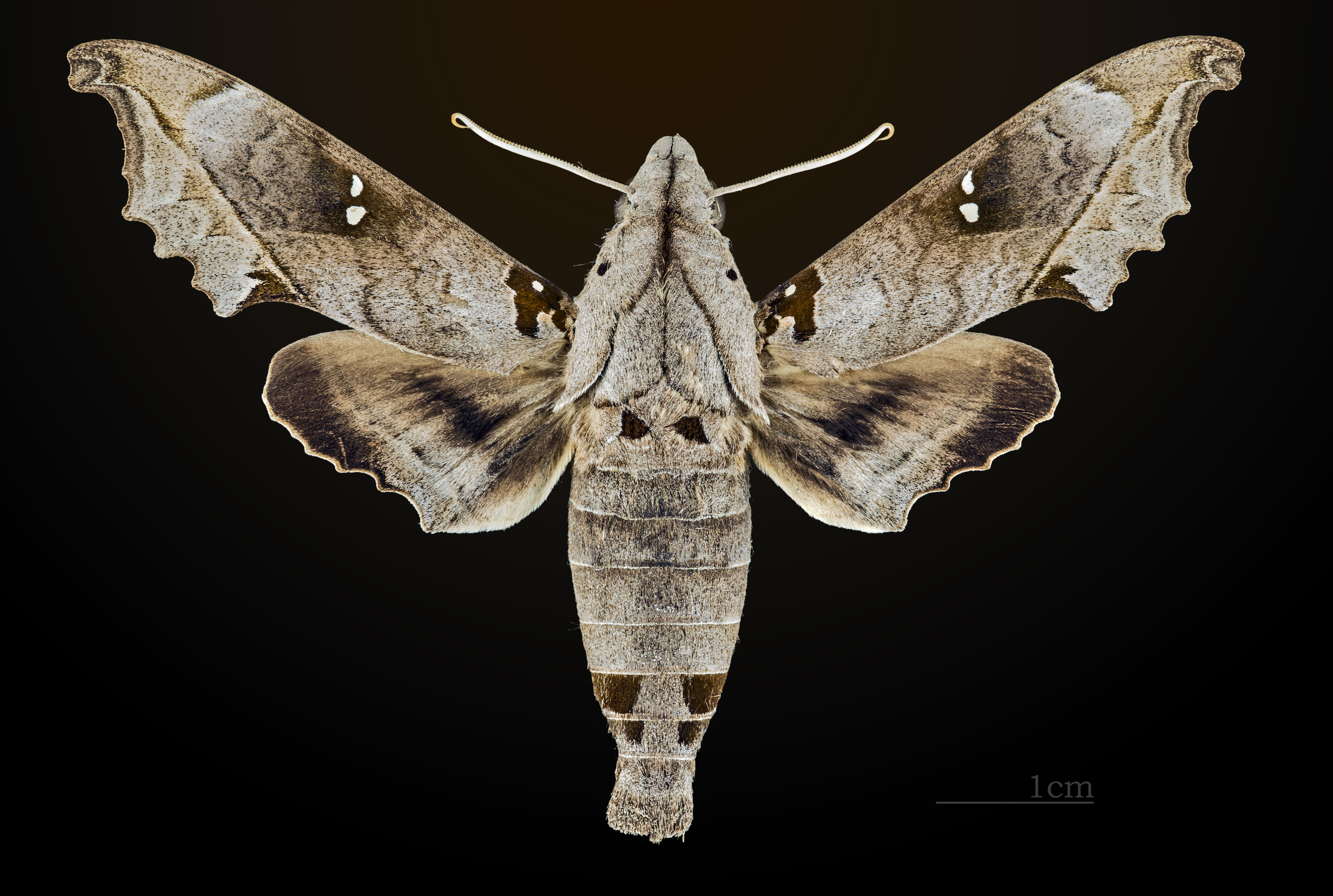
- Madoryx oiclus

Scientific classification
- Domain: Eukaryota
- Kingdom: Animalia
- Phylum: Arthropoda
- Class: Insecta
- Order: Lepidoptera
- Family: Sphingidae
- Subtribe: Dilophonotina
- Genus: Madoryx; Boisduval, 1875

Species
- See text

= Madoryx =

Genus of moths

Madoryx is a genus of moths in the family Sphingidae. The genus was first described by Jean Baptiste Boisduval in 1875.

== Species ==
- Madoryx bubastus (Cramer, 1777)
- Madoryx oiclus (Cramer, 1779) type species for the genus
- Madoryx plutonius (Hübner, 1819)
- Madoryx pseudothyreus (Grote, 1865)

== Gallery ==
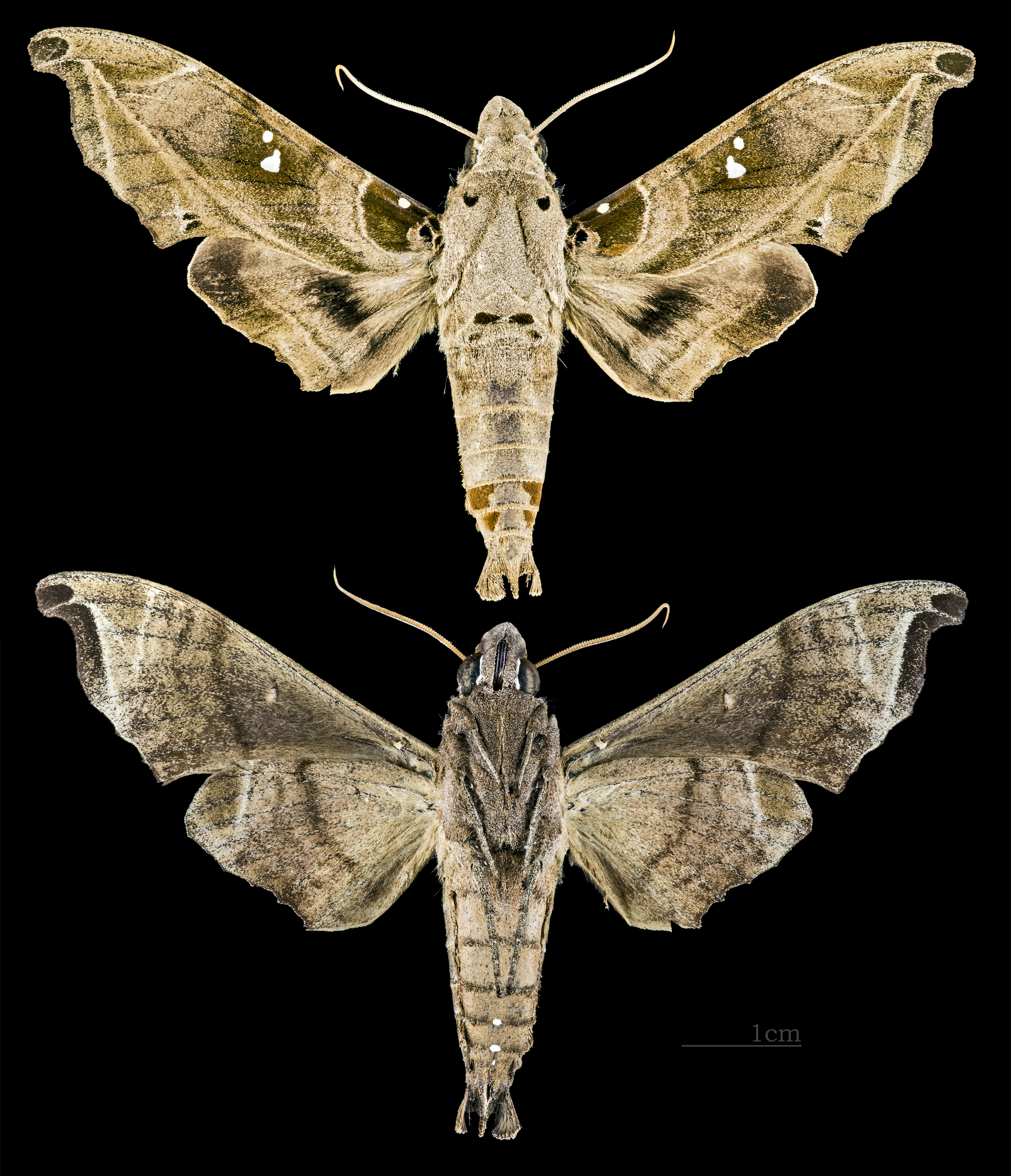
Madoryx bubastus

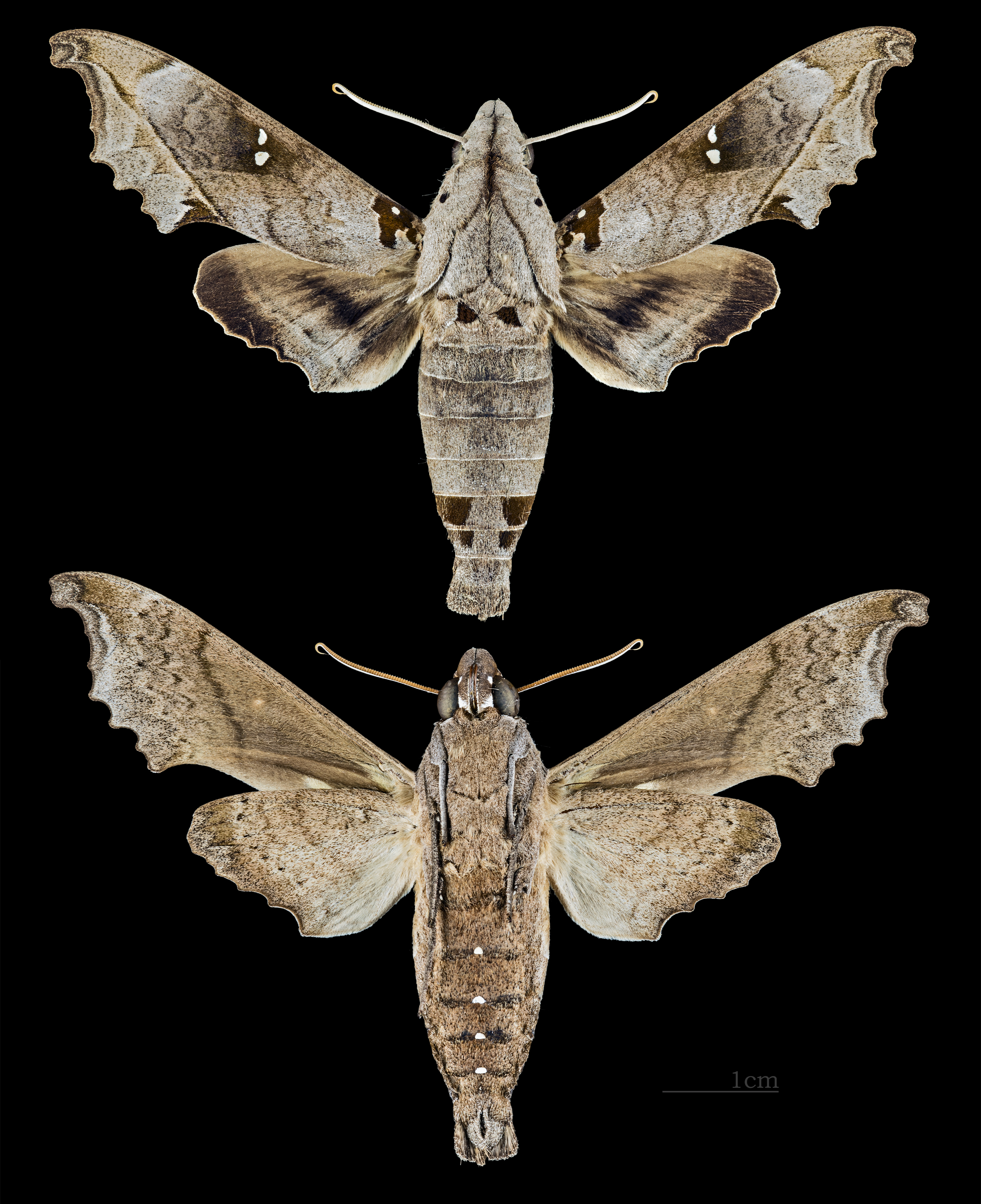
Madoryx oiclus

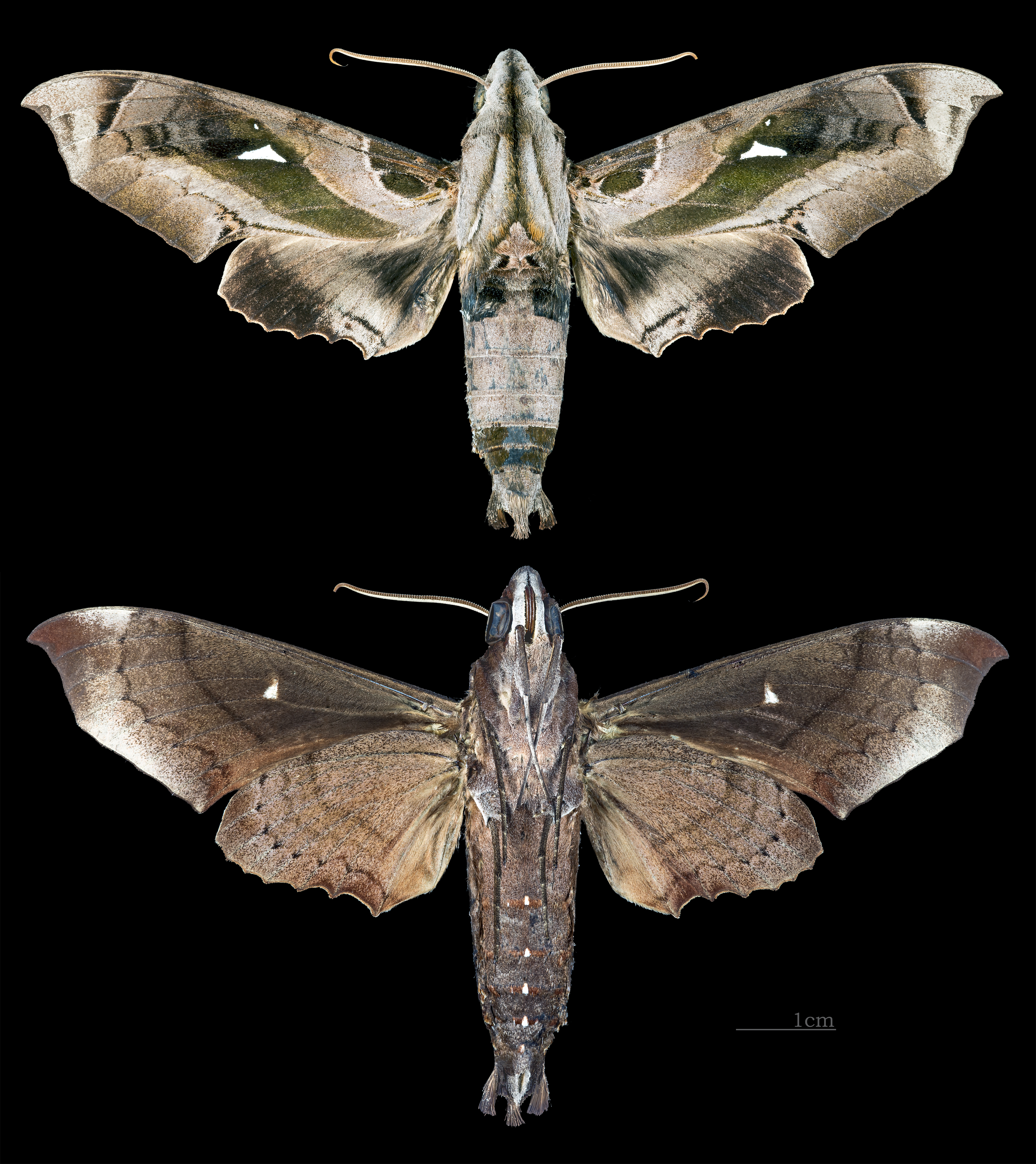
Madoryx plutonius

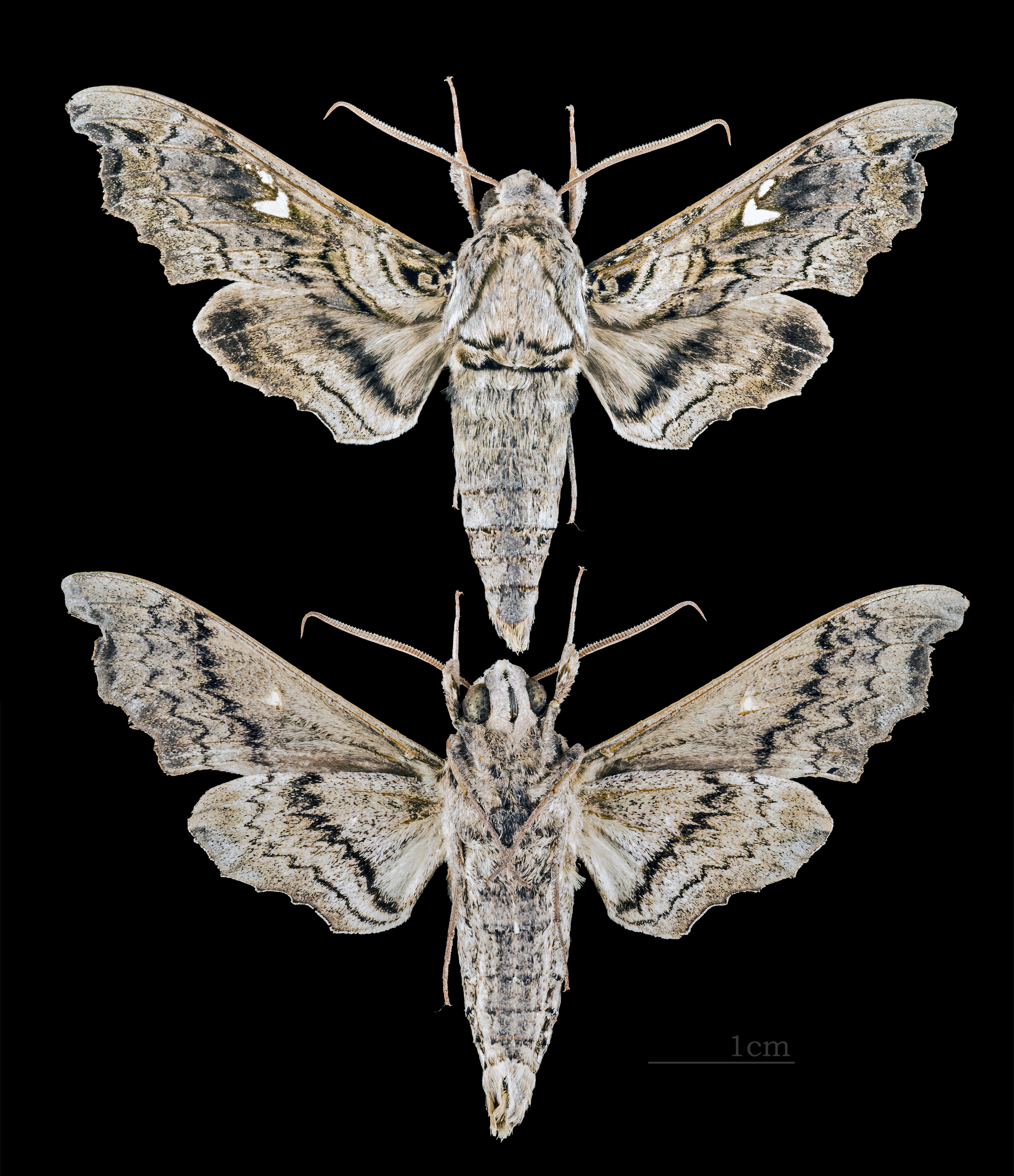
Madoryx pseudothyreus
