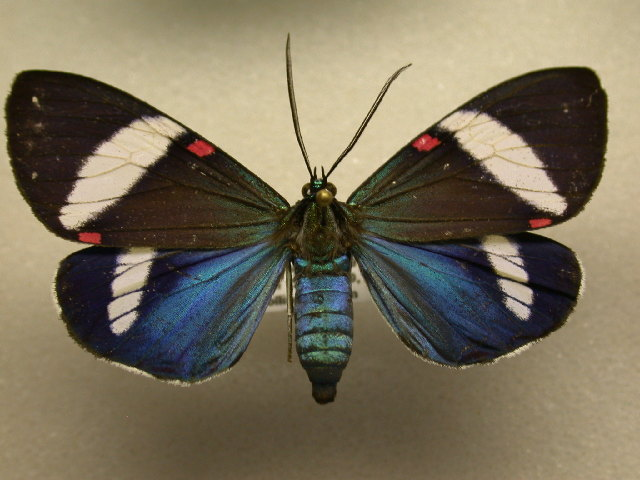
- Hypocrita reedia

Scientific classification
- Kingdom: Animalia
- Phylum: Arthropoda
- Clade: Pancrustacea
- Class: Insecta
- Order: Lepidoptera
- Superfamily: Noctuoidea
- Family: Erebidae
- Subfamily: Arctiinae
- Subtribe: Pericopina
- Genus: Hypocrita; Hübner, [1807]

Synonyms
- Eucyane Hübner, [1820]; Esthema Hübner, [1820]; Calepidos Boisduval, 1870

= Hypocrita =

Genus of moths

Hypocrita is a genus of tiger moths in the family Erebidae. The genus was erected by Jacob Hübner in 1807.

== Species ==
- Hypocrita albimacula (Druce, 1897)
- Hypocrita aletta (Stoll, [1782])
- Hypocrita ambigua (Hering, 1925)
- Hypocrita arcaei (Druce, 1884)
- Hypocrita bicolora (Sulzer, 1776)
- Hypocrita bleuzeni Toulgoët, 1990
- Hypocrita caeruleomaculata Toulgoët, 1988
- Hypocrita calida (Felder, 1874)
- Hypocrita celadon (Cramer, [1777])
- Hypocrita celina (Boisduval, 1870)
- Hypocrita chalybea (Hering, 1925)
- Hypocrita chislon (Druce, 1885)
- Hypocrita confluens (Butler, 1872)
- Hypocrita crocota (Druce, 1899)
- Hypocrita dejanira (Druce, 1895)
- Hypocrita drucei (Schaus, 1910)
- Hypocrita escuintla (Schaus, 1920)
- Hypocrita eulalia (Druce, 1899)
- Hypocrita euploeodes (Butler, 1871)
- Hypocrita excellens (Walker, 1854)
- Hypocrita glauca (Cramer, [1777])
- Hypocrita herrona (Butler, 1871)
- Hypocrita horaeoides Toulgoët, 1988
- Hypocrita hystaspes (Butler, 1871)
- Hypocrita joiceyi (Dognin, 1922)
- Hypocrita meres (Druce, 1911)
- Hypocrita mirabilis Toulgoët, 1988
- Hypocrita phanoptoides (Zerny, 1928)
- Hypocrita plagifera (C. & R. Felder, 1862)
- Hypocrita pylotis (Drury, 1773)
- Hypocrita reedia (Schaus, 1910)
- Hypocrita rhaetia (Druce, 1895)
- Hypocrita rhamses (Dognin, 1923)
- Hypocrita rhea (Dognin, 1923)
- Hypocrita rubrifascia (Hering, 1925)
- Hypocrita rubrimaculata (Hering, 1925)
- Hypocrita simulata (Walker, 1866)
- Hypocrita simulatrix Toulgoët, 1994
- Hypocrita speciosa (Walker, 1866)
- Hypocrita strigifera (Hering, 1925)
- Hypocrita temperata (Walker, 1856)
- Hypocrita toulgoetae (Gibeaux, 1982)
- Hypocrita turbida (Hering, 1925)
- Hypocrita variabilis (Zerny, 1928)
- Hypocrita wingerteri Vincent, 2004

== Former species ==
- Hypocrita phoenicides (Druce, 1884)
