= Coreura cerealia =

Scientific classification
- Domain: Eukaryota
- Kingdom: Animalia
- Phylum: Arthropoda
- Class: Insecta
- Order: Lepidoptera
- Superfamily: Noctuoidea
- Family: Erebidae
- Subfamily: Arctiinae
- Genus: Coreura
- Species: C. cerealia

Binomial name
- Coreura cerealia (Druce, 1897)

Synonyms
- Eucyane cerealia Druce, 1897; Coreura adamsi Lathy, 1899; Coreura hampsoni Dognin, 1898

Species of moth

Coreura cerealia is a moth of the subfamily Arctiinae. It was described by Herbert Druce in 1897. It is found in Ecuador.

The forewings are deep black and the hindwings are rich glossy deep blue, brightest near the base. The fringe is carmine red. The head, antennae, legs and thorax are deep black and the abdomen bright glossy blue.
