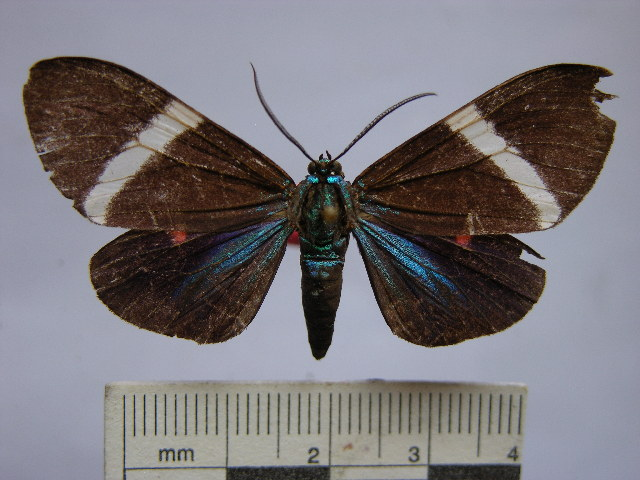

Scientific classification
- Kingdom: Animalia
- Phylum: Arthropoda
- Clade: Pancrustacea
- Class: Insecta
- Order: Lepidoptera
- Superfamily: Noctuoidea
- Family: Erebidae
- Subfamily: Arctiinae
- Genus: Hypocrita
- Species: H. albimacula

Binomial name
- Hypocrita albimacula (H. Druce, 1897)

Synonyms
- Eucyane albimacula H. Druce, 1897

= Hypocrita albimacula =

Species of moth

Hypocrita albimacula is a moth of the family Erebidae. It was described by Herbert Druce in 1897. It is found in Costa Rica, Belize and Guatemala.
