= Coreura engelkei =

Scientific classification
- Domain: Eukaryota
- Kingdom: Animalia
- Phylum: Arthropoda
- Class: Insecta
- Order: Lepidoptera
- Superfamily: Noctuoidea
- Family: Erebidae
- Subfamily: Arctiinae
- Genus: Coreura
- Species: C. engelkei

Binomial name
- Coreura engelkei Rothschild, 1912

Species of moth

Coreura engelkei is a moth of the subfamily Arctiinae. It was described by Rothschild in 1912. It is found in Colombia.
