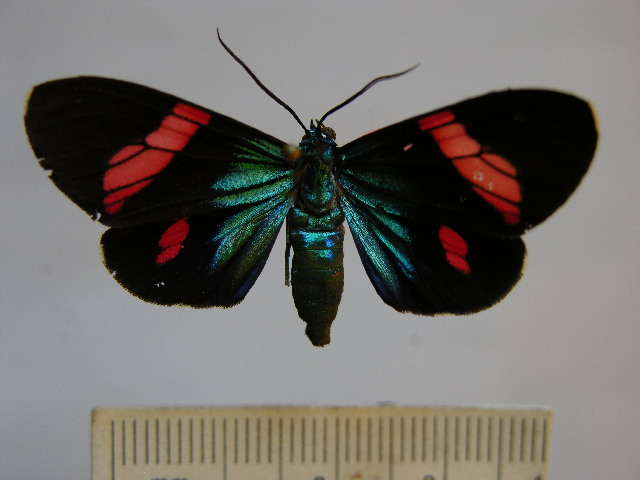

Scientific classification
- Domain: Eukaryota
- Kingdom: Animalia
- Phylum: Arthropoda
- Class: Insecta
- Order: Lepidoptera
- Superfamily: Noctuoidea
- Family: Erebidae
- Subfamily: Arctiinae
- Genus: Hypocrita
- Species: H. glauca

Binomial name
- Hypocrita glauca (Cramer, [1777])

Synonyms
- Phalaena glauca Cramer, [1777]; Callimorpha glaucans Stoll, 1837; Eucyane uranicola Walker, 1866; Eucyane diana Butler, 1876

= Hypocrita glauca =

Species of moth

Hypocrita glauca is a moth of the family Erebidae. It was described by Pieter Cramer in 1777. It is found in Suriname, Colombia, Brazil and Peru.
