= Hypocrita escuintla =

Scientific classification
- Domain: Eukaryota
- Kingdom: Animalia
- Phylum: Arthropoda
- Class: Insecta
- Order: Lepidoptera
- Superfamily: Noctuoidea
- Family: Erebidae
- Subfamily: Arctiinae
- Genus: Hypocrita
- Species: H. escuintla

Binomial name
- Hypocrita escuintla (Schaus, 1920)

Synonyms
- Eucyane escuintla Schaus, 1920

Species of moth

Hypocrita escuintla is a moth of the family Erebidae. It was described by William Schaus in 1920. It is found in Guatemala.
