= Coreura fida =

Scientific classification
- Kingdom: Animalia
- Phylum: Arthropoda
- Clade: Pancrustacea
- Class: Insecta
- Order: Lepidoptera
- Superfamily: Noctuoidea
- Family: Erebidae
- Subfamily: Arctiinae
- Genus: Coreura
- Species: C. fida

Binomial name
- Coreura fida (Hübner, 1827)

Synonyms
- Calodesma fida Hübner, 1827; Coreura atavia Hampson, 1898; Coreura venus Prittwitz, 1867

Species of moth

Coreura fida is a moth of the subfamily Arctiinae. It was described by Jacob Hübner in 1827. It is found in Mexico and Brazil.
