= Hypocrita aletta =

Scientific classification
- Domain: Eukaryota
- Kingdom: Animalia
- Phylum: Arthropoda
- Class: Insecta
- Order: Lepidoptera
- Superfamily: Noctuoidea
- Family: Erebidae
- Subfamily: Arctiinae
- Genus: Hypocrita
- Species: H. aletta

Binomial name
- Hypocrita aletta (Stoll, [1782])

Synonyms
- Phalaena aletta Stoll, [1782]

Species of moth

Hypocrita aletta is a moth of the family Erebidae. It was described by Caspar Stoll in 1782. It is found in Suriname, Costa Rica and Panama.
