= Hypocrita meres =

Scientific classification
- Domain: Eukaryota
- Kingdom: Animalia
- Phylum: Arthropoda
- Class: Insecta
- Order: Lepidoptera
- Superfamily: Noctuoidea
- Family: Erebidae
- Subfamily: Arctiinae
- Genus: Hypocrita
- Species: H. meres

Binomial name
- Hypocrita meres (H. Druce, 1911)

Synonyms
- Eucyane meres H. Druce, 1911

Species of moth

Hypocrita meres is a moth of the family Erebidae. It was described by Herbert Druce in 1911. It is found in Colombia.
