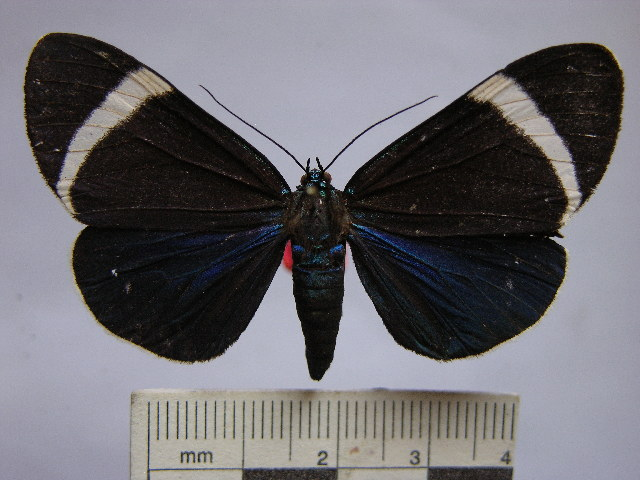

Scientific classification
- Domain: Eukaryota
- Kingdom: Animalia
- Phylum: Arthropoda
- Class: Insecta
- Order: Lepidoptera
- Superfamily: Noctuoidea
- Family: Erebidae
- Subfamily: Arctiinae
- Genus: Hypocrita
- Species: H. celina

Binomial name
- Hypocrita celina (Boisduval, 1870)

Synonyms
- Calepidos celina Boisduval, 1870; Eucyane cylotoides Hering, 1925; Eucyane escuintla Schaus, 1920; Eucyane pylotoides Hering, 1925

= Hypocrita celina =

Species of moth

Hypocrita celina is a moth of the family Erebidae first described by Jean Baptiste Boisduval in 1870. It is found in Guatemala.
