= Hypocrita simulata =

Scientific classification
- Kingdom: Animalia
- Phylum: Arthropoda
- Class: Insecta
- Order: Lepidoptera
- Superfamily: Noctuoidea
- Family: Erebidae
- Subfamily: Arctiinae
- Genus: Hypocrita
- Species: H. simulata

Binomial name
- Hypocrita simulata (Walker, 1866)

Synonyms
- Esthema simulata Walker, 1866; Esthema mimica Walker, 1866

Species of moth

Hypocrita simulata is a moth of the family Erebidae. It was described by Francis Walker in 1866. It is found in Colombia.
