= Hypocrita euploeodes =

Scientific classification
- Domain: Eukaryota
- Kingdom: Animalia
- Phylum: Arthropoda
- Class: Insecta
- Order: Lepidoptera
- Superfamily: Noctuoidea
- Family: Erebidae
- Subfamily: Arctiinae
- Genus: Hypocrita
- Species: H. euploeodes

Binomial name
- Hypocrita euploeodes (Butler, 1871)

Synonyms
- Esthema euploeodes Butler, 1871

Species of moth

Hypocrita euploeodes is a moth of the family Erebidae. It was described by Arthur Gardiner Butler in 1871. It is found in Colombia.
