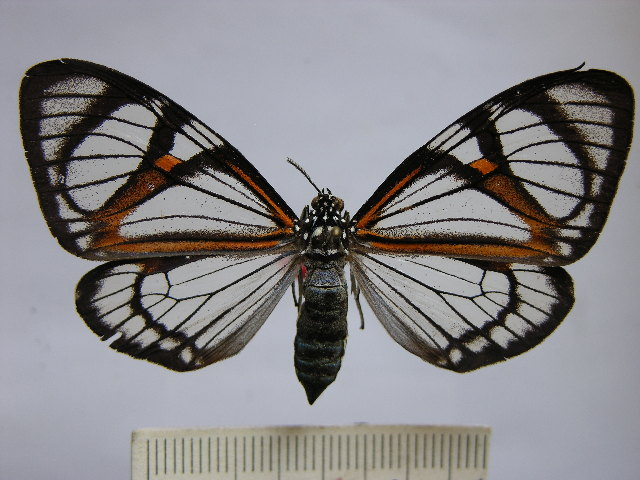

Scientific classification
- Domain: Eukaryota
- Kingdom: Animalia
- Phylum: Arthropoda
- Class: Insecta
- Order: Lepidoptera
- Superfamily: Noctuoidea
- Family: Erebidae
- Subfamily: Arctiinae
- Genus: Hypocrita
- Species: H. phanoptoides

Binomial name
- Hypocrita phanoptoides (Zerny, 1928)

Synonyms
- Eucyane phanoptoides Zerny, 1928

= Hypocrita phanoptoides =

Species of moth

Hypocrita phanoptoides is a moth of the family Erebidae. It was described by Hans Zerny in 1928. It is found in Colombia and Ecuador.
