= Hypocrita rhea =

Scientific classification
- Domain: Eukaryota
- Kingdom: Animalia
- Phylum: Arthropoda
- Class: Insecta
- Order: Lepidoptera
- Superfamily: Noctuoidea
- Family: Erebidae
- Subfamily: Arctiinae
- Genus: Hypocrita
- Species: H. rhea

Binomial name
- Hypocrita rhea (Dognin, 1923)

Synonyms
- Centronia rhea Dognin, 1923

Species of moth

Hypocrita rhea is a moth of the family Erebidae. It was described by Paul Dognin in 1923. It is found in Colombia.
