= Hypocrita wingerteri =

Scientific classification
- Domain: Eukaryota
- Kingdom: Animalia
- Phylum: Arthropoda
- Class: Insecta
- Order: Lepidoptera
- Superfamily: Noctuoidea
- Family: Erebidae
- Subfamily: Arctiinae
- Genus: Hypocrita
- Species: H. wingerteri

Binomial name
- Hypocrita wingerteri Vincent, 2004

Species of moth

Hypocrita wingerteri is a moth of the family Erebidae. It was described by Vincent in 2004. It is found in Peru.
