= Hypocrita toulgoetae =

Scientific classification
- Kingdom: Animalia
- Phylum: Arthropoda
- Clade: Pancrustacea
- Class: Insecta
- Order: Lepidoptera
- Superfamily: Noctuoidea
- Family: Erebidae
- Subfamily: Arctiinae
- Genus: Hypocrita
- Species: H. toulgoetae

Binomial name
- Hypocrita toulgoetae (Gibeaux, 1982)

Synonyms
- Eucyane toulgoetae Gibeaux, 1982

Species of moth

Hypocrita toulgoetae is a moth of the family Erebidae. It was described by Christian Gibeaux in 1982. It is found in Ecuador.
