= Hypocrita joiceyi =

Scientific classification
- Domain: Eukaryota
- Kingdom: Animalia
- Phylum: Arthropoda
- Class: Insecta
- Order: Lepidoptera
- Superfamily: Noctuoidea
- Family: Erebidae
- Subfamily: Arctiinae
- Genus: Hypocrita
- Species: H. joiceyi

Binomial name
- Hypocrita joiceyi (Dognin, 1922)

Synonyms
- Pericopis joiceyi Dognin, 1922

Species of moth

Hypocrita joiceyi is a moth of the family Erebidae. It was described by Paul Dognin in 1922. It is found in Colombia.
