= Hypocrita confluens =

Scientific classification
- Domain: Eukaryota
- Kingdom: Animalia
- Phylum: Arthropoda
- Class: Insecta
- Order: Lepidoptera
- Superfamily: Noctuoidea
- Family: Erebidae
- Subfamily: Arctiinae
- Genus: Hypocrita
- Species: H. confluens

Binomial name
- Hypocrita confluens (Butler, 1872)

Synonyms
- Esthema confluens Butler, 1872

Species of moth

Hypocrita confluens is a moth of the family Erebidae. It was described by Arthur Gardiner Butler in 1872. It is found in Brazil and Bolivia.
