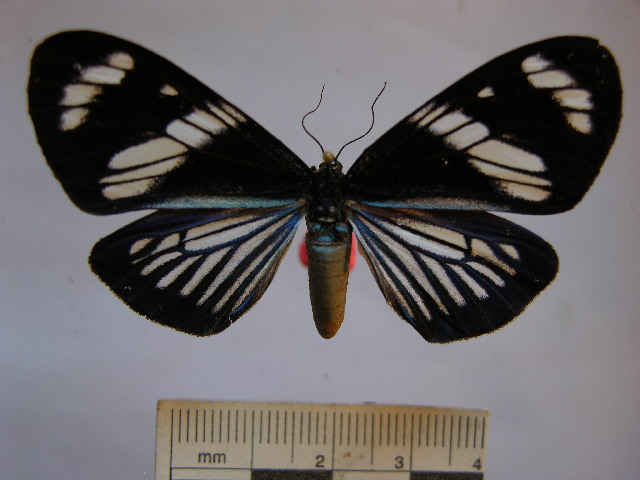

Scientific classification
- Domain: Eukaryota
- Kingdom: Animalia
- Phylum: Arthropoda
- Class: Insecta
- Order: Lepidoptera
- Superfamily: Noctuoidea
- Family: Erebidae
- Subfamily: Arctiinae
- Genus: Hypocrita
- Species: H. strigifera

Binomial name
- Hypocrita strigifera (Hering, 1925)

Synonyms
- Eucyane strigifera Hering, 1925

= Hypocrita strigifera =

Species of moth

Hypocrita strigifera is a moth of the family Erebidae. It was described by Hering in 1925. It is found in Brazil.
