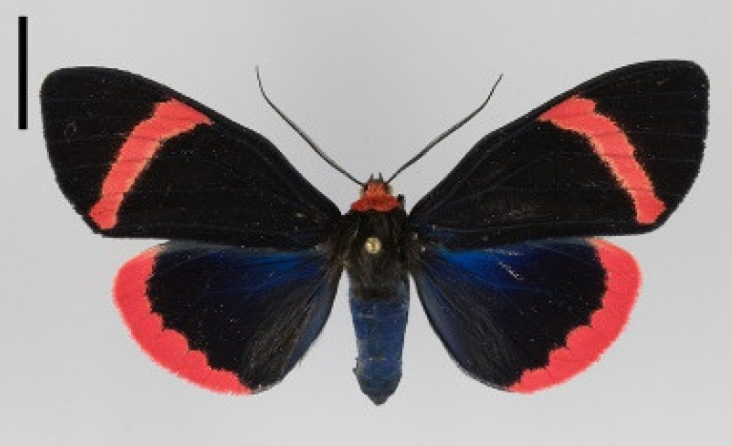

Scientific classification
- Domain: Eukaryota
- Kingdom: Animalia
- Phylum: Arthropoda
- Class: Insecta
- Order: Lepidoptera
- Superfamily: Noctuoidea
- Family: Erebidae
- Subfamily: Arctiinae
- Genus: Coreura
- Species: C. simsoni

Binomial name
- Coreura simsoni (Druce, 1885)

Synonyms
- Eucyane simsoni Druce, 1885; Coreura euchromioides Druce, 1898

= Coreura simsoni =

Species of moth

Coreura simsoni is a moth of the subfamily Arctiinae. It was described by Druce in 1885. It is found in Colombia, Ecuador and Bolivia.

The forewings are brownish black, glossed with dark blue near the base, and crossed from about the middle of the costal margin to the anal angle by a bright carmine band edged on either side with a narrow row of pinkish-white scales. The band is widest on the costal margin. The hindwings are brown, glossed with very dark blue. The outer margins are broadly bordered with carmine.
