= Hypocrita simulatrix =

Scientific classification
- Kingdom: Animalia
- Phylum: Arthropoda
- Class: Insecta
- Order: Lepidoptera
- Superfamily: Noctuoidea
- Family: Erebidae
- Subfamily: Arctiinae
- Genus: Hypocrita
- Species: H. simulatrix

Binomial name
- Hypocrita simulatrix Toulgoët, 1994

Species of moth

Hypocrita simulatrix is a moth of the family Erebidae. It was described by Hervé de Toulgoët in 1994.
