= Coreura euchromioides =

Scientific classification
- Kingdom: Animalia
- Phylum: Arthropoda
- Class: Insecta
- Order: Lepidoptera
- Superfamily: Noctuoidea
- Family: Erebidae
- Subfamily: Arctiinae
- Genus: Coreura
- Species: C. euchromioides

Binomial name
- Coreura euchromioides Walker, 1864

Species of moth

Coreura euchromioides is a moth of the subfamily Arctiinae. It was described by Francis Walker in 1864. It is found in Colombia.
