= Hypocrita speciosa =

Scientific classification
- Kingdom: Animalia
- Phylum: Arthropoda
- Clade: Pancrustacea
- Class: Insecta
- Order: Lepidoptera
- Superfamily: Noctuoidea
- Family: Erebidae
- Subfamily: Arctiinae
- Genus: Hypocrita
- Species: H. speciosa

Binomial name
- Hypocrita speciosa (Walker, 1866)

Synonyms
- Esthema speciosa Walker, 1866; Esthema venosa Felder, 1874

Species of moth

Hypocrita speciosa is a moth of the family Erebidae. It was described by Francis Walker in 1866. It is found in Colombia.
