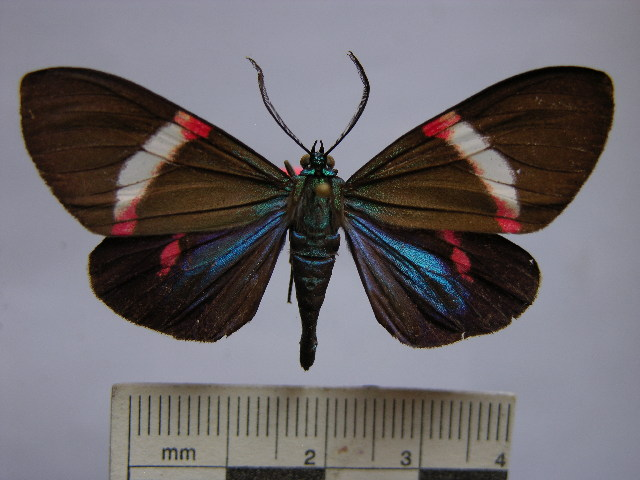

Scientific classification
- Domain: Eukaryota
- Kingdom: Animalia
- Phylum: Arthropoda
- Class: Insecta
- Order: Lepidoptera
- Superfamily: Noctuoidea
- Family: Erebidae
- Subfamily: Arctiinae
- Genus: Hypocrita
- Species: H. arcaei

Binomial name
- Hypocrita arcaei (H. Druce, 1884)

Synonyms
- Eucyane arcaei H. Druce, 1884

= Hypocrita arcaei =

Species of moth

Hypocrita arcaei is a moth of the family Erebidae. It was described by Herbert Druce in 1884. It is found in Panama, Costa Rica, Guatemala and Venezuela.
