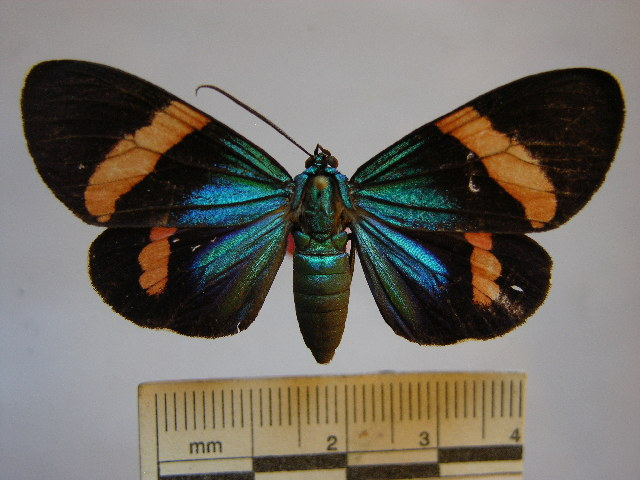

Scientific classification
- Kingdom: Animalia
- Phylum: Arthropoda
- Class: Insecta
- Order: Lepidoptera
- Superfamily: Noctuoidea
- Family: Erebidae
- Subfamily: Arctiinae
- Genus: Hypocrita
- Species: H. temperata

Binomial name
- Hypocrita temperata (Walker, 1856)

Synonyms
- Eucyane temperata Walker, 1856; Esthema jucunda Felder, 1874; Eucyane egaensis Butler, 1874

= Hypocrita temperata =

Species of moth

Hypocrita temperata is a moth of the family Erebidae. It was described by Francis Walker in 1856. It is found in Brazil and French Guiana.
