= Coreura lysimachides =

Scientific classification
- Domain: Eukaryota
- Kingdom: Animalia
- Phylum: Arthropoda
- Class: Insecta
- Order: Lepidoptera
- Superfamily: Noctuoidea
- Family: Erebidae
- Subfamily: Arctiinae
- Genus: Coreura
- Species: C. lysimachides

Binomial name
- Coreura lysimachides H. Druce, 1897

Species of moth

Coreura lysimachides is a moth of the subfamily Arctiinae. It was described by Herbert Druce in 1897. It is found in Ecuador and Peru.
