= Coreura interposita =

Scientific classification
- Kingdom: Animalia
- Phylum: Arthropoda
- Class: Insecta
- Order: Lepidoptera
- Superfamily: Noctuoidea
- Family: Erebidae
- Subfamily: Arctiinae
- Genus: Coreura
- Species: C. interposita

Binomial name
- Coreura interposita Hampson, 1901

Species of moth

Coreura interposita is a moth of the subfamily Arctiinae. It was described by George Hampson in 1901. It is found in Venezuela.
