= Hypocrita chislon =

Scientific classification
- Domain: Eukaryota
- Kingdom: Animalia
- Phylum: Arthropoda
- Class: Insecta
- Order: Lepidoptera
- Superfamily: Noctuoidea
- Family: Erebidae
- Subfamily: Arctiinae
- Genus: Hypocrita
- Species: H. chislon

Binomial name
- Hypocrita chislon (H. Druce, 1885)

Synonyms
- Eucyane chislon H. Druce, 1885; Thyrgis chislon

Species of moth

Hypocrita chislon is a moth of the family Erebidae. It was described by Herbert Druce in 1885. It is found in Ecuador.
