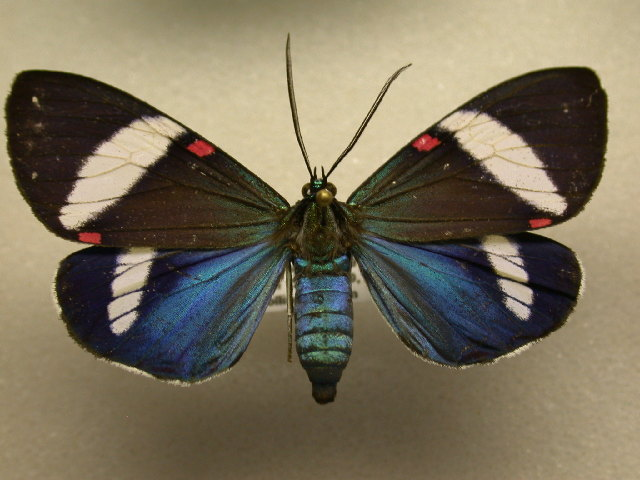

Scientific classification
- Domain: Eukaryota
- Kingdom: Animalia
- Phylum: Arthropoda
- Class: Insecta
- Order: Lepidoptera
- Superfamily: Noctuoidea
- Family: Erebidae
- Subfamily: Arctiinae
- Genus: Hypocrita
- Species: H. reedia

Binomial name
- Hypocrita reedia (Schaus, 1910)

Synonyms
- Centronia reedia Schaus, 1910

= Hypocrita reedia =

Species of moth

Hypocrita reedia is a moth of the family Erebidae. It was described by Schaus in 1910. It is found in Costa Rica.
