= Hypocrita mirabilis =

Scientific classification
- Kingdom: Animalia
- Phylum: Arthropoda
- Class: Insecta
- Order: Lepidoptera
- Superfamily: Noctuoidea
- Family: Erebidae
- Subfamily: Arctiinae
- Genus: Hypocrita
- Species: H. mirabilis

Binomial name
- Hypocrita mirabilis Toulgoët, 1988

Species of moth

Hypocrita mirabilis is a moth of the family Erebidae. It was described by Hervé de Toulgoët in 1988. It is found in Ecuador.
