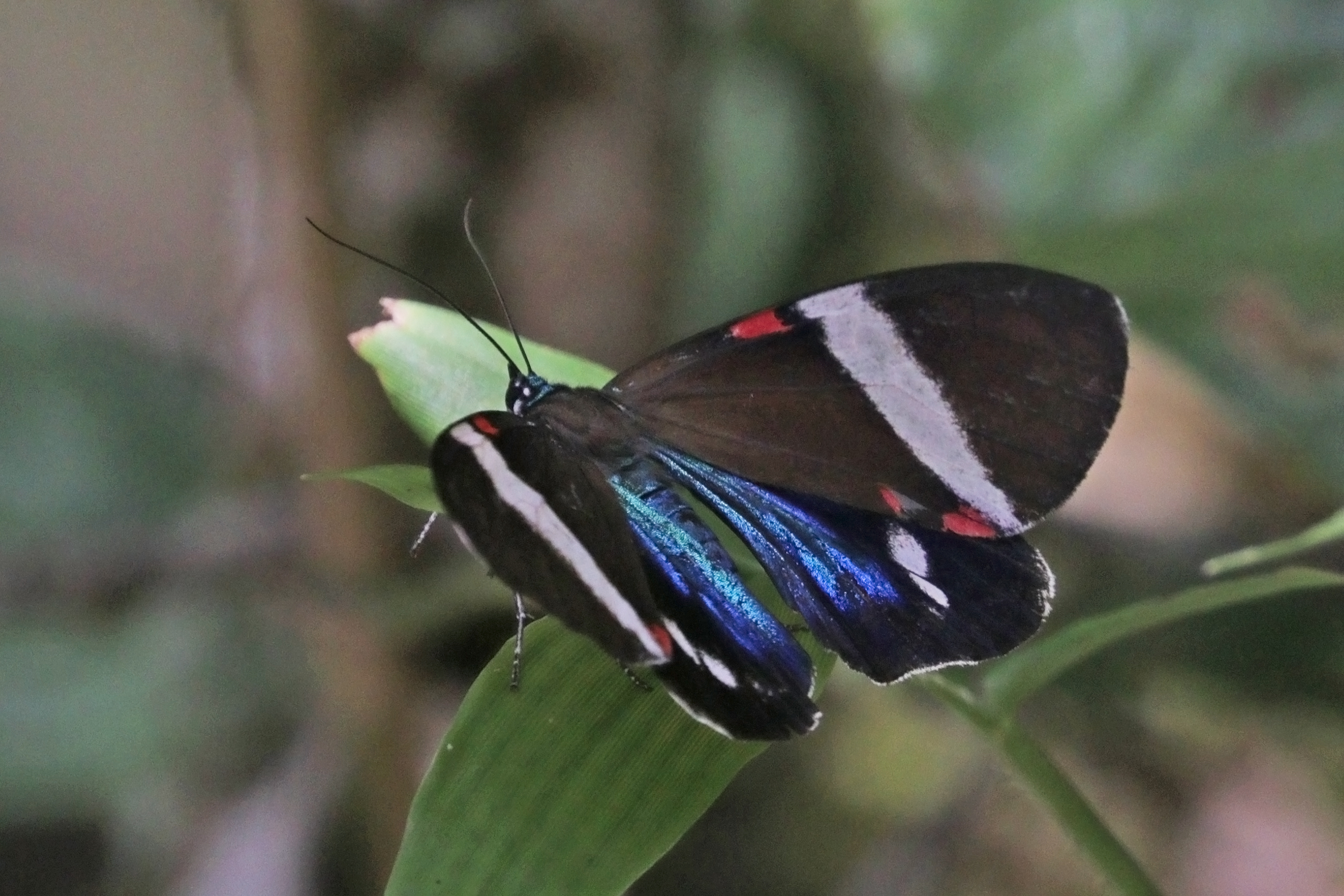
- Mount Totumas cloud forest, Panama

Scientific classification
- Domain: Eukaryota
- Kingdom: Animalia
- Phylum: Arthropoda
- Class: Insecta
- Order: Lepidoptera
- Superfamily: Noctuoidea
- Family: Erebidae
- Subfamily: Arctiinae
- Genus: Hypocrita
- Species: H. drucei

Binomial name
- Hypocrita drucei (Schaus, 1910)

Synonyms
- Centronia drucei Schaus, 1910

= Hypocrita drucei =

Species of moth

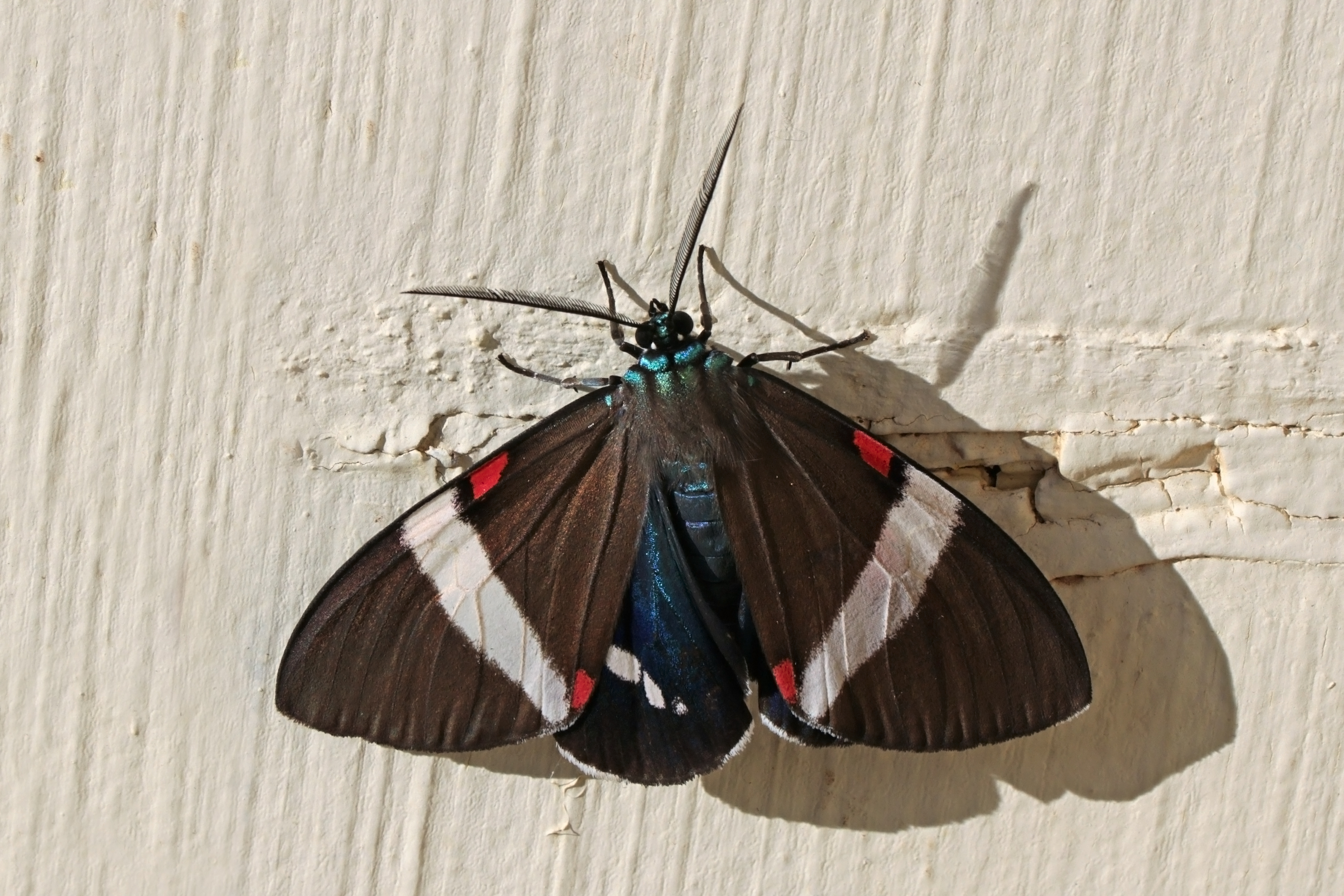

Hypocrita drucei is a moth of the family Erebidae. It was described by Schaus in 1910. It is found in Costa Rica, Guatemala and Panama.
