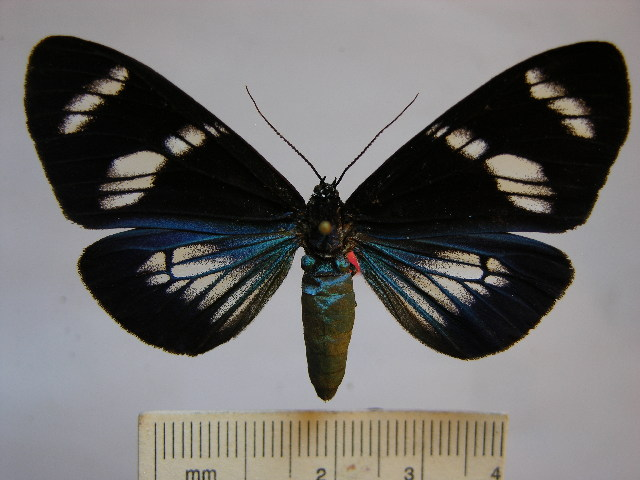

Scientific classification
- Domain: Eukaryota
- Kingdom: Animalia
- Phylum: Arthropoda
- Class: Insecta
- Order: Lepidoptera
- Superfamily: Noctuoidea
- Family: Erebidae
- Subfamily: Arctiinae
- Genus: Hypocrita
- Species: H. plagifera

Binomial name
- Hypocrita plagifera (C. & R. Felder, 1862)

Synonyms
- Esthema plagifera C. & R. Felder, 1862; Eucyane uranigera Walker, 1866

= Hypocrita plagifera =

Species of moth

Hypocrita plagifera is a moth of the family Erebidae. It was described by Cajetan and Rudolf Felder in 1862. It is found in Brazil.
