= Coreura eion =

Scientific classification
- Domain: Eukaryota
- Kingdom: Animalia
- Phylum: Arthropoda
- Class: Insecta
- Order: Lepidoptera
- Superfamily: Noctuoidea
- Family: Erebidae
- Subfamily: Arctiinae
- Genus: Coreura
- Species: C. eion

Binomial name
- Coreura eion (H. Druce, 1896)

Synonyms
- Pseudocharidea eion H. Druce, 1896

Species of moth

Coreura eion is a moth of the subfamily Arctiinae. It was described by Herbert Druce in 1896. It is found in Costa Rica and Panama.
