= Hypocrita hystaspes =

Scientific classification
- Domain: Eukaryota
- Kingdom: Animalia
- Phylum: Arthropoda
- Class: Insecta
- Order: Lepidoptera
- Superfamily: Noctuoidea
- Family: Erebidae
- Subfamily: Arctiinae
- Genus: Hypocrita
- Species: H. hystaspes

Binomial name
- Hypocrita hystaspes (Butler, 1871)

Synonyms
- Eucyane hystaspes Butler, 1871

Species of moth

Hypocrita hystaspes is a moth of the family Erebidae. It was described by Arthur Gardiner Butler in 1871. It is found in Venezuela.
