= Coreura alcedo =

Scientific classification
- Domain: Eukaryota
- Kingdom: Animalia
- Phylum: Arthropoda
- Class: Insecta
- Order: Lepidoptera
- Superfamily: Noctuoidea
- Family: Erebidae
- Subfamily: Arctiinae
- Genus: Coreura
- Species: C. alcedo

Binomial name
- Coreura alcedo Draudt, 1915

Species of moth

Coreura alcedo is a moth of the subfamily Arctiinae. It was described by Max Wilhelm Karl Draudt in 1915.
