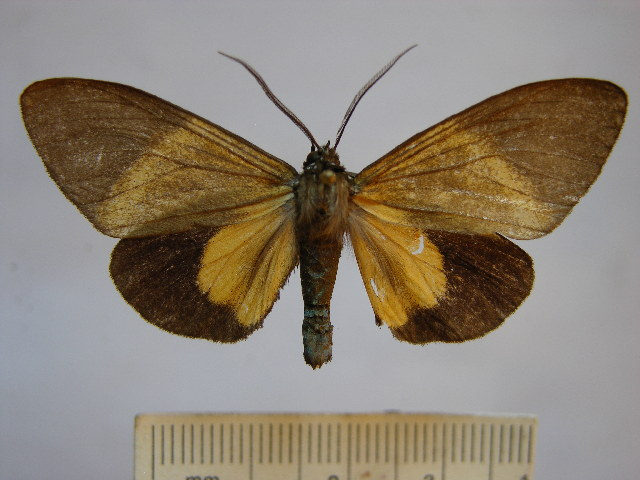

Scientific classification
- Kingdom: Animalia
- Phylum: Arthropoda
- Class: Insecta
- Order: Lepidoptera
- Superfamily: Noctuoidea
- Family: Erebidae
- Subfamily: Arctiinae
- Genus: Hypocrita
- Species: H. bleuzeni

Binomial name
- Hypocrita bleuzeni Toulgoët, 1990

= Hypocrita bleuzeni =

Species of moth

Hypocrita bleuzeni is a moth of the family Erebidae. It was described by Hervé de Toulgoët in 1990. It is found in Venezuela.
