= Hypocrita dejanira =

Scientific classification
- Domain: Eukaryota
- Kingdom: Animalia
- Phylum: Arthropoda
- Class: Insecta
- Order: Lepidoptera
- Superfamily: Noctuoidea
- Family: Erebidae
- Subfamily: Arctiinae
- Genus: Hypocrita
- Species: H. dejanira

Binomial name
- Hypocrita dejanira (H. Druce, 1895)

Synonyms
- Eucyane dejanira H. Druce, 1895

Species of moth

Hypocrita dejanira is a moth of the family Erebidae. It was described by Herbert Druce in 1895. It is found in Brazil.
