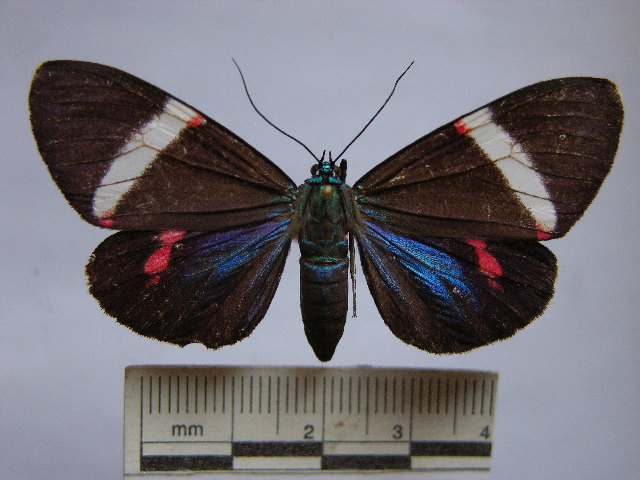

Scientific classification
- Domain: Eukaryota
- Kingdom: Animalia
- Phylum: Arthropoda
- Class: Insecta
- Order: Lepidoptera
- Superfamily: Noctuoidea
- Family: Erebidae
- Subfamily: Arctiinae
- Genus: Hypocrita
- Species: H. turbida

Binomial name
- Hypocrita turbida (Hering, 1925)

Synonyms
- Eucyane turbida Hering, 1925

= Hypocrita turbida =

Species of moth

Hypocrita turbida is a moth of the family Erebidae. It was described by Hering in 1925. It is found in Colombia.
