= Coreura =

Scientific classification
- Kingdom: Animalia
- Phylum: Arthropoda
- Class: Insecta
- Order: Lepidoptera
- Superfamily: Noctuoidea
- Family: Erebidae
- Subfamily: Arctiinae
- Subtribe: Euchromiina
- Genus: Coreura; Walker, [1865]

Synonyms
- Pseudocharidea Druce, 1896

Genus of moths

Coreura is a genus of moths in the subfamily Arctiinae. The genus was erected by Francis Walker in 1865.

== Species ==
- Coreura albicosta Draudt, 1915
- Coreura alcedo Draudt, 1915
- Coreura cerealia Druce, 1897
- Coreura eion Druce, 1896
- Coreura engelkei Rothschild, 1912
- Coreura euchromioides Walker, 1864
- Coreura fida Hübner, 1827
- Coreura interposita Hampson, 1901
- Coreura lysimachides Druce, 1897
- Coreura phoenicides (Druce, 1884)
- Coreura simsoni Druce, 1885
- Coreura sinerubra Kaye, 1919
