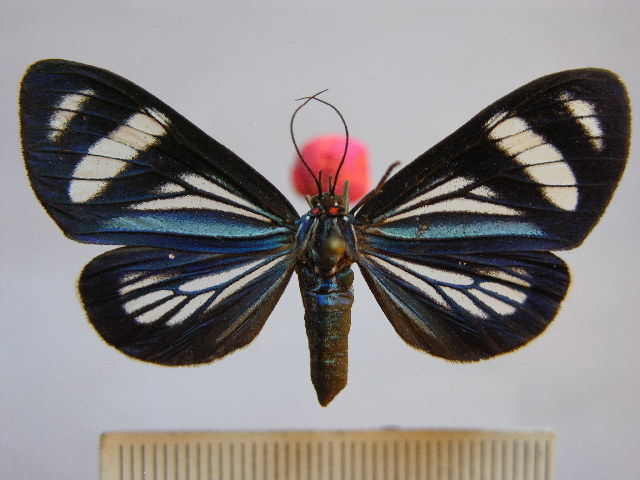

Scientific classification
- Domain: Eukaryota
- Kingdom: Animalia
- Phylum: Arthropoda
- Class: Insecta
- Order: Lepidoptera
- Superfamily: Noctuoidea
- Family: Erebidae
- Subfamily: Arctiinae
- Genus: Hypocrita
- Species: H. bicolora

Binomial name
- Hypocrita bicolora (Sulzer, 1776)

Synonyms
- Phalaena bicolora Sulzer, 1776; Bombyx bicolorata; Esthema bicolora; Eucyane bicolor; Hypocrita dichroa Hübner, [1807]

= Hypocrita bicolora =

Species of moth

Hypocrita bicolora is a moth of the family Erebidae. It was described by Sulzer in 1776. It is found in Panama.
