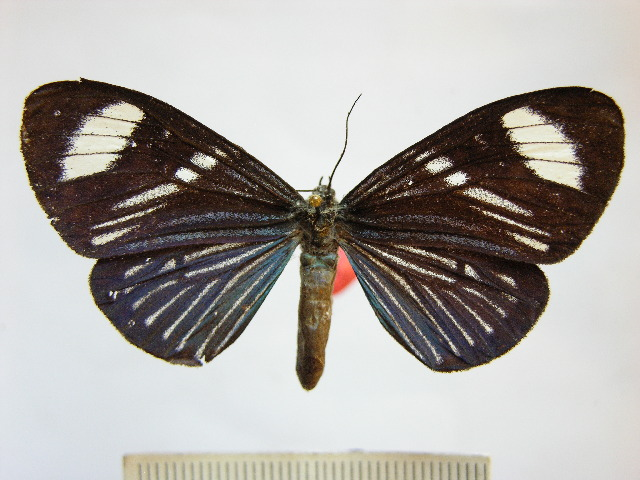

Scientific classification
- Domain: Eukaryota
- Kingdom: Animalia
- Phylum: Arthropoda
- Class: Insecta
- Order: Lepidoptera
- Superfamily: Noctuoidea
- Family: Erebidae
- Subfamily: Arctiinae
- Genus: Hypocrita
- Species: H. celadon

Binomial name
- Hypocrita celadon (Cramer, [1777])

Synonyms
- Phalaena celadon Cramer, [1777]; Calepidos anacharsis Boisduval, 1870

= Hypocrita celadon =

Species of moth

Hypocrita celadon is a moth of the family Erebidae. It was described by Pieter Cramer in 1777. It is found in Argentina, French Guiana, Suriname and Nicaragua.
