= Hypocrita rubrifascia =

Scientific classification
- Domain: Eukaryota
- Kingdom: Animalia
- Phylum: Arthropoda
- Class: Insecta
- Order: Lepidoptera
- Superfamily: Noctuoidea
- Family: Erebidae
- Subfamily: Arctiinae
- Genus: Hypocrita
- Species: H. rubrifascia

Binomial name
- Hypocrita rubrifascia (Hering, 1925)

Synonyms
- Eucyane rubrifascia Hering, 1925

Species of moth

Hypocrita rubrifascia is a moth species of the family Erebidae. It was described by Hering in 1925. It is found in Brazil and French Guiana.
