= Hypocrita rhaetia =

Scientific classification
- Domain: Eukaryota
- Kingdom: Animalia
- Phylum: Arthropoda
- Class: Insecta
- Order: Lepidoptera
- Superfamily: Noctuoidea
- Family: Erebidae
- Subfamily: Arctiinae
- Genus: Hypocrita
- Species: H. rhaetia

Binomial name
- Hypocrita rhaetia (H. Druce, 1895)

Synonyms
- Eucyane rhaetia H. Druce, 1895

Species of moth

Hypocrita rhaetia is a moth of the family Erebidae. It was described by Herbert Druce in 1895. It can be found in Bolivia.
