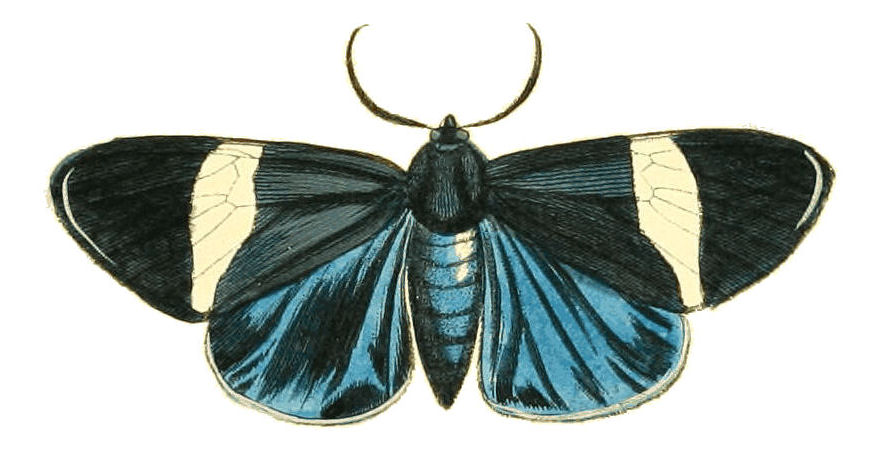

Scientific classification
- Domain: Eukaryota
- Kingdom: Animalia
- Phylum: Arthropoda
- Class: Insecta
- Order: Lepidoptera
- Superfamily: Noctuoidea
- Family: Erebidae
- Subfamily: Arctiinae
- Genus: Hypocrita
- Species: H. pylotis

Binomial name
- Hypocrita pylotis (Drury, 1773)

Synonyms
- Phalaena pylotis Drury, 1773

= Hypocrita pylotis =

Species of moth

Hypocrita pylotis is a moth of the family Erebidae. It was described by Dru Drury in 1773. It is found in Honduras.

== Description ==
Upperside: antennae black and pectinated (comb like). Tongue orange and spiral. Head, thorax, and abdomen fine mazarine blue. Anterior wings dark mazarine, having a single white bar running from the middle of the anterior edge to the lower corner. A small part of the cilia at the tips is white, the rest being of the same colour as the wings. Posterior wings of the same colour as the superior, and immaculate, except the cilia, which is entirely white.

Underside: palpi black. Neck white. Breast and sides mazarine. The legs black and white. Abdomen orange, ringed with mazarine. Wings coloured as on the upper side; but next the body of a finer and stronger blue. The white part of the tips is also stronger and more distinct. The margins of all the wings are entire. Wing-span 2 1/2 inches (64 mm).
