= Hypocrita calida =

Scientific classification
- Domain: Eukaryota
- Kingdom: Animalia
- Phylum: Arthropoda
- Class: Insecta
- Order: Lepidoptera
- Superfamily: Noctuoidea
- Family: Erebidae
- Subfamily: Arctiinae
- Genus: Hypocrita
- Species: H. calida

Binomial name
- Hypocrita calida (Felder & Rogenhofer, 1874)

Synonyms
- Esthema calida Felder, 1874

Species of moth

Hypocrita calida is a moth of the family Erebidae. It was described by Felder and Rogenhofer in 1874. It is found in Colombia.
