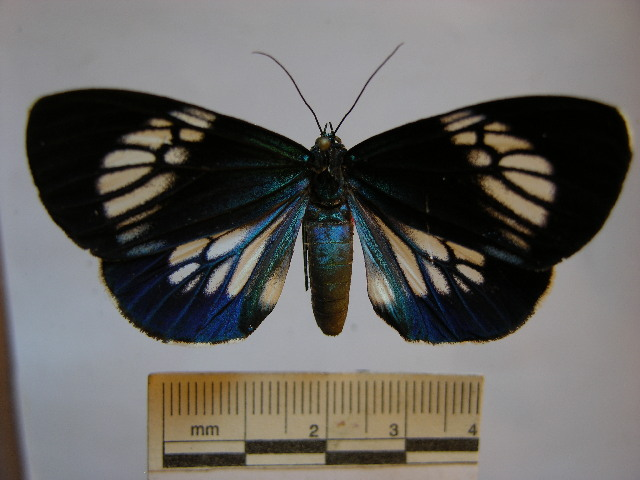

Scientific classification
- Domain: Eukaryota
- Kingdom: Animalia
- Phylum: Arthropoda
- Class: Insecta
- Order: Lepidoptera
- Superfamily: Noctuoidea
- Family: Erebidae
- Subfamily: Arctiinae
- Genus: Hypocrita
- Species: H. eulalia

Binomial name
- Hypocrita eulalia (H. Druce, 1899)

Synonyms
- Esthema eulalia H. Druce, 1899

= Hypocrita eulalia =

Species of moth

Hypocrita eulalia is a moth of the family Erebidae. It was described by Herbert Druce in 1899. It is found in Brazil and Peru.
