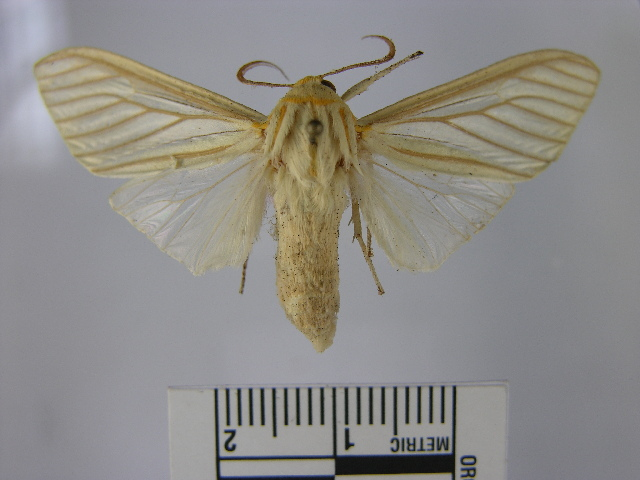
- Munona iridescens

Scientific classification
- Domain: Eukaryota
- Kingdom: Animalia
- Phylum: Arthropoda
- Class: Insecta
- Order: Lepidoptera
- Superfamily: Noctuoidea
- Family: Erebidae
- Subfamily: Arctiinae
- Subtribe: Phaegopterina
- Genus: Munona; Schaus, 1894

= Munona =

Genus of moths

Munona is a genus of moths in the family Erebidae described by William Schaus in 1894.

== Species ==
- Munona iridescens Schaus, 1894 Venezuela, Peru, Brazil, Ecuador
- Munona carolinepalmerae Espinoza, 2017 Costa Rica
- Munona robpuschendorfi Espinoza, 2017 Costa Rica

== Former species ==
- Munona haxairei
