= Symphlebia alinda =

Scientific classification
- Kingdom: Animalia
- Phylum: Arthropoda
- Class: Insecta
- Order: Lepidoptera
- Superfamily: Noctuoidea
- Family: Erebidae
- Subfamily: Arctiinae
- Genus: Symphlebia
- Species: S. alinda

Binomial name
- Symphlebia alinda (Dyar, 1909)

Synonyms
- Prumala alinda Dyar, 1909

Species of moth

Symphlebia alinda is a moth in the family Erebidae. It was described by Harrison Gray Dyar Jr. in 1909. It is found in Mexico.
