= Symphlebia distincta =

Scientific classification
- Domain: Eukaryota
- Kingdom: Animalia
- Phylum: Arthropoda
- Class: Insecta
- Order: Lepidoptera
- Superfamily: Noctuoidea
- Family: Erebidae
- Subfamily: Arctiinae
- Genus: Symphlebia
- Species: S. distincta

Binomial name
- Symphlebia distincta (Rothschild, 1933)

Synonyms
- Prumala distincta Rothschild, 1933

Species of moth

Symphlebia distincta is a moth in the family Erebidae. It was described by Walter Rothschild in 1933. It is found in Brazil.
