= Symphlebia dissimulata =

Scientific classification
- Domain: Eukaryota
- Kingdom: Animalia
- Phylum: Arthropoda
- Class: Insecta
- Order: Lepidoptera
- Superfamily: Noctuoidea
- Family: Erebidae
- Subfamily: Arctiinae
- Genus: Symphlebia
- Species: S. dissimulata

Binomial name
- Symphlebia dissimulata (Reich, 1936)

Synonyms
- Automolis dissimulata Reich, 1936

Species of moth

Symphlebia dissimulata is a moth in the family Erebidae. It was described by Reich in 1936. It is found in Brazil.
