= Symphlebia nigranalis =

Scientific classification
- Domain: Eukaryota
- Kingdom: Animalia
- Phylum: Arthropoda
- Class: Insecta
- Order: Lepidoptera
- Superfamily: Noctuoidea
- Family: Erebidae
- Subfamily: Arctiinae
- Genus: Symphlebia
- Species: S. nigranalis

Binomial name
- Symphlebia nigranalis (Schaus, 1915)

Synonyms
- Prumala nigranalis Schaus, 1915

Species of moth

Symphlebia nigranalis is a moth in the subfamily Arctiinae. It was described by Schaus in 1915. It is found in Brazil.
