= Symphlebia hyalina =

Scientific classification
- Domain: Eukaryota
- Kingdom: Animalia
- Phylum: Arthropoda
- Class: Insecta
- Order: Lepidoptera
- Superfamily: Noctuoidea
- Family: Erebidae
- Subfamily: Arctiinae
- Genus: Symphlebia
- Species: S. hyalina

Binomial name
- Symphlebia hyalina (Rothschild, 1909)

Synonyms
- Automolis hyalina Rothschild, 1909; Automolis hyalina amaculata Rothschild, 1910

Species of moth

Symphlebia hyalina is a moth in the subfamily Arctiinae first described by Rothschild in 1909. It is found in Colombia.
