= Symphlebia haenkei =

Scientific classification
- Domain: Eukaryota
- Kingdom: Animalia
- Phylum: Arthropoda
- Class: Insecta
- Order: Lepidoptera
- Superfamily: Noctuoidea
- Family: Erebidae
- Subfamily: Arctiinae
- Genus: Symphlebia
- Species: S. haenkei

Binomial name
- Symphlebia haenkei (Daniel, 1952)

Synonyms
- Prumala haenkei Daniel, 1952

Species of moth

Symphlebia haenkei is a moth in the subfamily Arctiinae first described by Franz Daniel in 1952. It is found in Bolivia.
