= Symphlebia catenata =

Scientific classification
- Domain: Eukaryota
- Kingdom: Animalia
- Phylum: Arthropoda
- Class: Insecta
- Order: Lepidoptera
- Superfamily: Noctuoidea
- Family: Erebidae
- Subfamily: Arctiinae
- Genus: Symphlebia
- Species: S. catenata

Binomial name
- Symphlebia catenata (Schaus, 1905)

Synonyms
- Idalus catenata Schaus, 1905

Species of moth

Symphlebia catenata is a moth in the family Erebidae. It was described by William Schaus in 1905. It is found in Brazil and French Guiana.
