= Symphlebia dorisca =

Scientific classification
- Domain: Eukaryota
- Kingdom: Animalia
- Phylum: Arthropoda
- Class: Insecta
- Order: Lepidoptera
- Superfamily: Noctuoidea
- Family: Erebidae
- Subfamily: Arctiinae
- Genus: Symphlebia
- Species: S. dorisca

Binomial name
- Symphlebia dorisca (Schaus, 1933)

Synonyms
- Prumala dorisca Schaus, 1933; Xanthoarctia dorisca (Schaus, 1933)

Species of moth

Symphlebia dorisca is a moth in the subfamily Arctiinae. It was described by Schaus in 1933. It is found in Colombia.
