= Symphlebia coarctata =

Scientific classification
- Kingdom: Animalia
- Phylum: Arthropoda
- Class: Insecta
- Order: Lepidoptera
- Superfamily: Noctuoidea
- Family: Erebidae
- Subfamily: Arctiinae
- Genus: Symphlebia
- Species: S. coarctata

Binomial name
- Symphlebia coarctata Toulgoët, 1991

Species of moth

Symphlebia coarctata is a moth in the subfamily Arctiinae. It was described by Hervé de Toulgoët in 1991. It is found in Ecuador.
