= Symphlebia affinis =

Scientific classification
- Domain: Eukaryota
- Kingdom: Animalia
- Phylum: Arthropoda
- Class: Insecta
- Order: Lepidoptera
- Superfamily: Noctuoidea
- Family: Erebidae
- Subfamily: Arctiinae
- Genus: Symphlebia
- Species: S. affinis

Binomial name
- Symphlebia affinis (Rothschild, 1909)

Synonyms
- Amaxia affinis Rothschild, 1909

Species of moth

Symphlebia affinis is a moth in the subfamily Arctiinae. It was described by Walter Rothschild in 1909. It is found in Peru.
