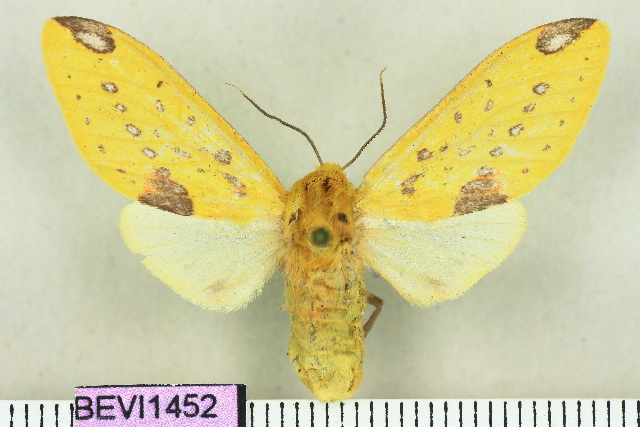

Scientific classification
- Domain: Eukaryota
- Kingdom: Animalia
- Phylum: Arthropoda
- Class: Insecta
- Order: Lepidoptera
- Superfamily: Noctuoidea
- Family: Erebidae
- Subfamily: Arctiinae
- Genus: Symphlebia
- Species: S. obliquefasciatus

Binomial name
- Symphlebia obliquefasciatus (Reich, 1935)

Synonyms
- Idalus obliquefasciatus Reich, 1935

= Symphlebia obliquefasciatus =

Species of moth

Symphlebia obliquefasciatus is a moth in the family Erebidae. It was described by Reich in 1935. It is found in Brazil.
