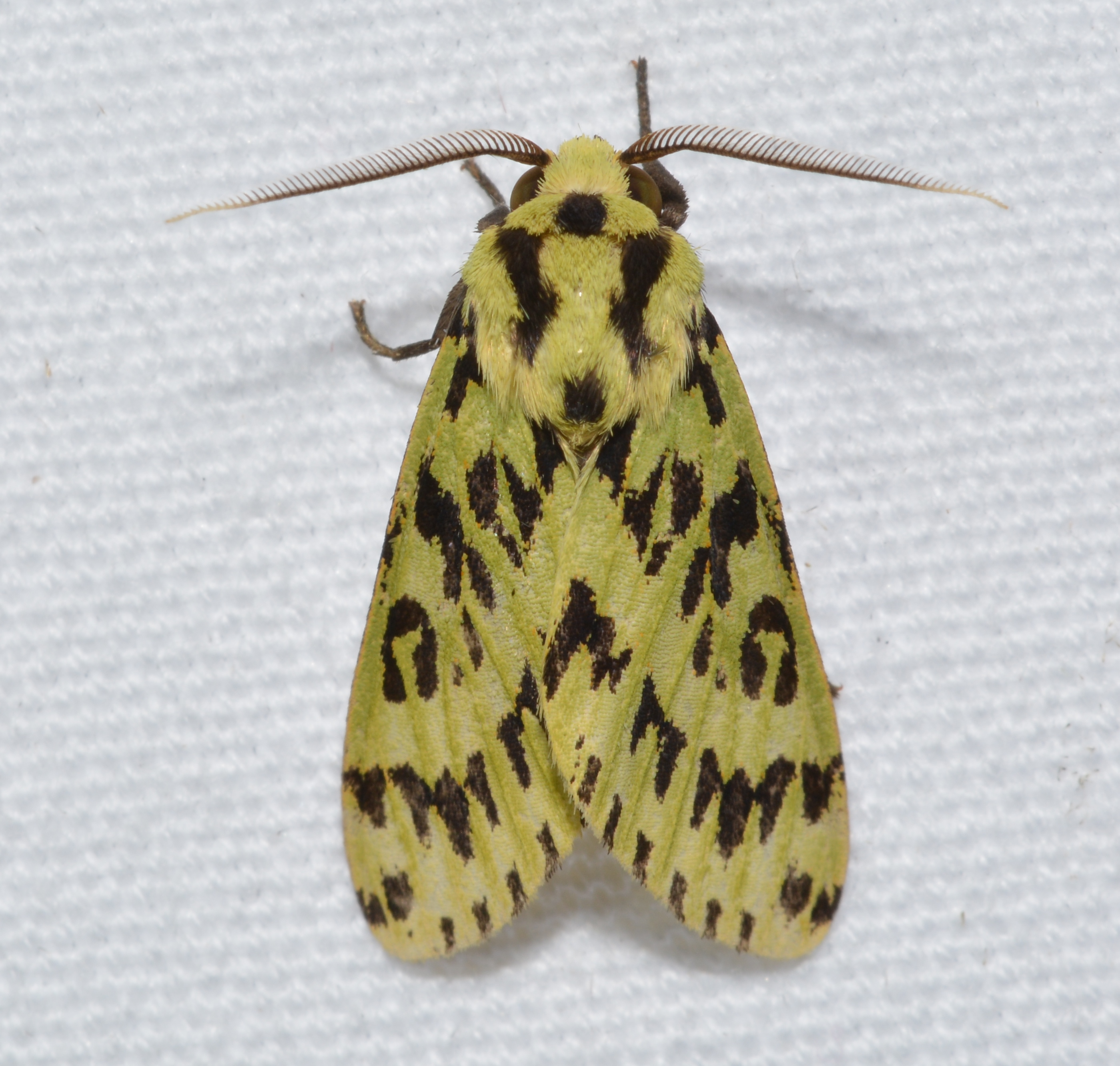

Scientific classification
- Domain: Eukaryota
- Kingdom: Animalia
- Phylum: Arthropoda
- Class: Insecta
- Order: Lepidoptera
- Superfamily: Noctuoidea
- Family: Erebidae
- Subfamily: Arctiinae
- Genus: Symphlebia
- Species: S. muscosa

Binomial name
- Symphlebia muscosa (Schaus, 1910)

Synonyms
- Prumala muscosa Schaus, 1910

= Symphlebia muscosa =

Species of moth

Symphlebia muscosa is a moth in the subfamily Arctiinae. It was described by William Schaus in 1910. It is found in French Guiana, Venezuela, Peru, Panama and Costa Rica.
