= Symphlebia palmeri =

Scientific classification
- Domain: Eukaryota
- Kingdom: Animalia
- Phylum: Arthropoda
- Class: Insecta
- Order: Lepidoptera
- Superfamily: Noctuoidea
- Family: Erebidae
- Subfamily: Arctiinae
- Genus: Symphlebia
- Species: S. palmeri

Binomial name
- Symphlebia palmeri (Rothschild, 1910)

Synonyms
- Prumala palmeri Rothschild, 1910

Species of moth

Symphlebia palmeri is a moth in the subfamily Arctiinae. It was described by Rothschild in 1910. It is found in Colombia.
