= Symphlebia favillacea =

Scientific classification
- Domain: Eukaryota
- Kingdom: Animalia
- Phylum: Arthropoda
- Class: Insecta
- Order: Lepidoptera
- Superfamily: Noctuoidea
- Family: Erebidae
- Subfamily: Arctiinae
- Genus: Symphlebia
- Species: S. favillacea

Binomial name
- Symphlebia favillacea (Rothschild, 1909)

Synonyms
- Automolis favillacea Rothschild, 1909

Species of moth

Symphlebia favillacea is a moth in the family Erebidae first described by Walter Rothschild in 1909. It is found in Suriname and French Guiana.
