= Symphlebia primulina =

Scientific classification
- Domain: Eukaryota
- Kingdom: Animalia
- Phylum: Arthropoda
- Class: Insecta
- Order: Lepidoptera
- Superfamily: Noctuoidea
- Family: Erebidae
- Subfamily: Arctiinae
- Genus: Symphlebia
- Species: S. primulina

Binomial name
- Symphlebia primulina (Dognin, 1914)

Synonyms
- Antaxia primulina Dognin, 1914

Species of moth

Symphlebia primulina is a moth in the subfamily Arctiinae. It was described by Paul Dognin in 1914. It is found in Colombia.
