= Symphlebia jamaicensis =

Scientific classification
- Domain: Eukaryota
- Kingdom: Animalia
- Phylum: Arthropoda
- Class: Insecta
- Order: Lepidoptera
- Superfamily: Noctuoidea
- Family: Erebidae
- Subfamily: Arctiinae
- Genus: Symphlebia
- Species: S. jamaicensis

Binomial name
- Symphlebia jamaicensis (Schaus, 1896)

Synonyms
- Prumala jamaicensis Schaus, 1896

Species of moth

Symphlebia jamaicensis is a moth in the subfamily Arctiinae. It was described by Schaus in 1896. It is found on Jamaica.
