= Symphlebia venusta =

Scientific classification
- Domain: Eukaryota
- Kingdom: Animalia
- Phylum: Arthropoda
- Class: Insecta
- Order: Lepidoptera
- Superfamily: Noctuoidea
- Family: Erebidae
- Subfamily: Arctiinae
- Genus: Symphlebia
- Species: S. venusta

Binomial name
- Symphlebia venusta (Dognin, 1921)

Synonyms
- Prumala venusta Dognin, 1921

Species of moth

Symphlebia venusta is a moth in the subfamily Arctiinae. It was described by Paul Dognin in 1921. It is found in Peru and Bolivia.
