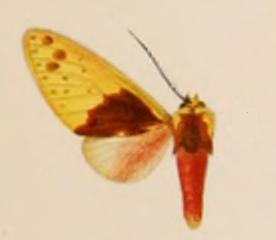

Scientific classification
- Domain: Eukaryota
- Kingdom: Animalia
- Phylum: Arthropoda
- Class: Insecta
- Order: Lepidoptera
- Superfamily: Noctuoidea
- Family: Erebidae
- Subfamily: Arctiinae
- Genus: Symphlebia
- Species: S. costaricensis

Binomial name
- Symphlebia costaricensis (Rothschild, 1909)

Synonyms
- Neaxia costaricensis Rothschild, 1909; Amaxia costaricensis (Rothschild, 1909)

= Symphlebia costaricensis =

Species of moth

Symphlebia costaricensis is a moth of the subfamily Arctiinae first described by Rothschild in 1909. It is found in Costa Rica and Guatemala.
