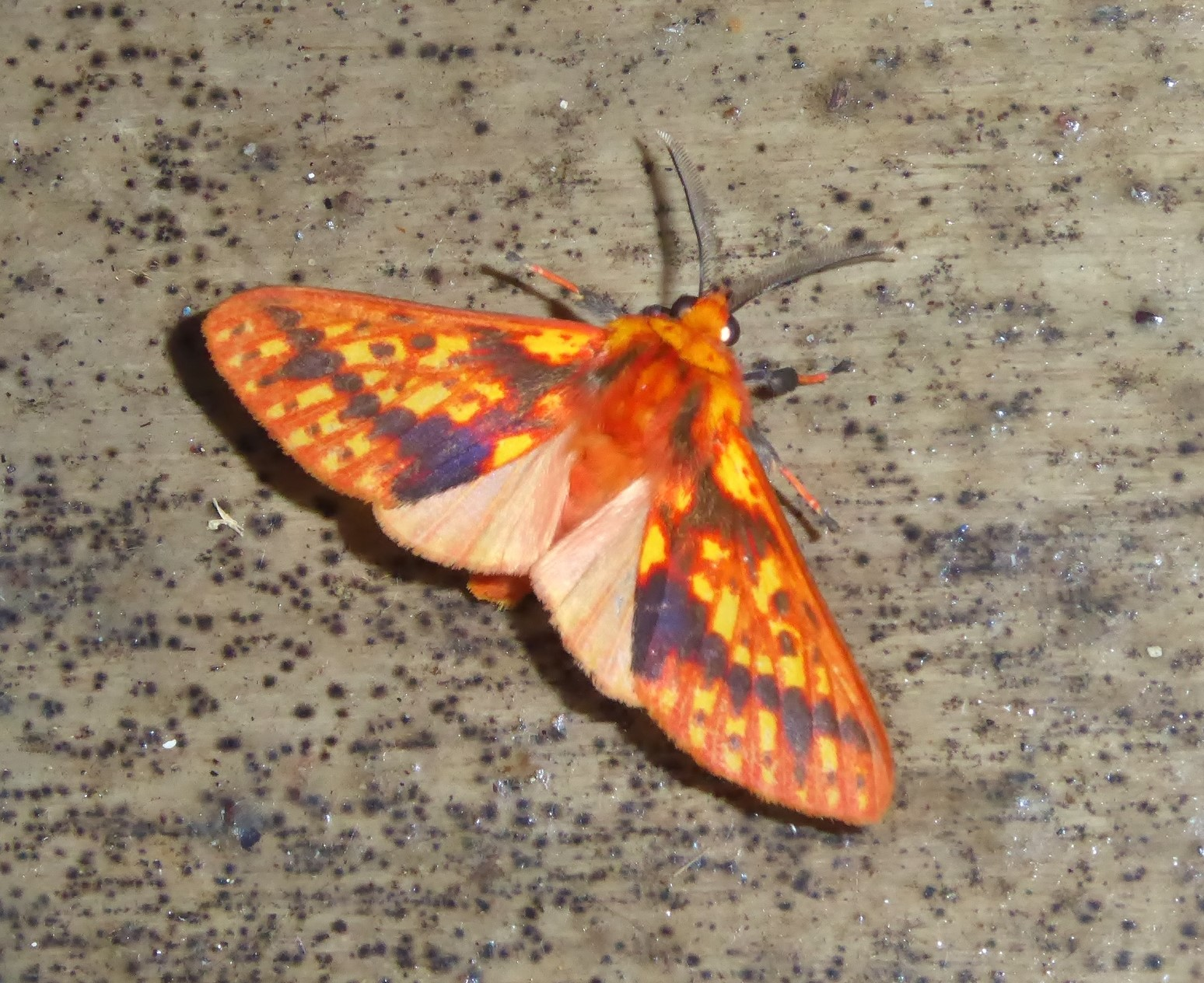
- Symphlebia sp. in Colombia

Scientific classification
- Domain: Eukaryota
- Kingdom: Animalia
- Phylum: Arthropoda
- Class: Insecta
- Order: Lepidoptera
- Superfamily: Noctuoidea
- Family: Erebidae
- Subfamily: Arctiinae
- Tribe: Arctiini
- Subtribe: Phaegopterina
- Genus: Symphlebia; Felder, 1874

Synonyms
- Prumala Schaus, 1896; Antaxia Hampson, 1898

= Symphlebia =

Genus of moths

Symphlebia is a genus of moths in the family Erebidae. The genus was erected by Felder in 1874.

== Species ==
- Symphlebia abdominalis (Herrich-Schäffer, [1855])
- Symphlebia affinis (Rothschild, 1909)
- Symphlebia alinda (Dyar, 1909)
- Symphlebia angulifascia (Rothschild, 1933)
- Symphlebia aryllis Schaus, 1896
- Symphlebia catenata (Schaus, 1905)
- Symphlebia citraria (Dognin, 1889)
- Symphlebia coarctata Toulgoët, 1991
- Symphlebia costaricensis (Rothschild, 1909)
- Symphlebia dissimulata (Reich, 1936)
- Symphlebia distincta (Rothschild, 1933)
- Symphlebia doncasteri (Rothschild, 1910)
- Symphlebia dorisca (Schaus, 1933)
- Symphlebia erratum (Schaus, 1933)
- Symphlebia favillacea (Rothschild, 1909)
- Symphlebia foliosa (Seitz, 1921)
- Symphlebia fulminans (Rothschild, 1910)
- Symphlebia geertsi (Hulstaert, 1924)
- Symphlebia haenkei (Daniel, 1952)
- Symphlebia haxairei Toulgoët, 1988
- Symphlebia herbosa (Schaus, 1910)
- Symphlebia hyalina (Rothschild, 1909)
- Symphlebia ignipicta (Hampson, 1903)
- Symphlebia indistincta (Rothschild, 1909)
- Symphlebia ipsea (Druce, 1884)
- Symphlebia jalapa (Druce, 1894)
- Symphlebia jamaicensis (Schaus, 1896)
- Symphlebia lophocampoides Felder, 1874
- Symphlebia maculicincta (Hampson, 1901)
- Symphlebia meridionalis (Schaus, 1905)
- Symphlebia muscosa (Schaus, 1910)
- Symphlebia neja (Schaus, 1905)
- Symphlebia nigranalis (Schaus, 1915)
- Symphlebia nigropunctata (Reich, 1935)
- Symphlebia obliquefasciatus (Reich, 1935)
- Symphlebia palmeri (Rothschild, 1910)
- Symphlebia panema (Dognin, 1923)
- Symphlebia primulina (Dognin, 1914)
- Symphlebia pyrgion (Druce, 1897)
- Symphlebia rosa (Druce, 1909)
- Symphlebia similis (Rothschild, 1917)
- Symphlebia suanoides (Schaus, 1921)
- Symphlebia suanus (Druce, 1902)
- Symphlebia sulphurea (Joicey & Talbot, 1916)
- Symphlebia tessellata (Schaus, 1910)
- Symphlebia tetrodonta (Dognin, 1911)
- Symphlebia tolimensis (Rothschild, 1916)
- Symphlebia underwoodi (Rothschild, 1910)
- Symphlebia venusta (Dognin, 1921)

== Former species ==
- Symphlebia perflua (Walker, 1869)
