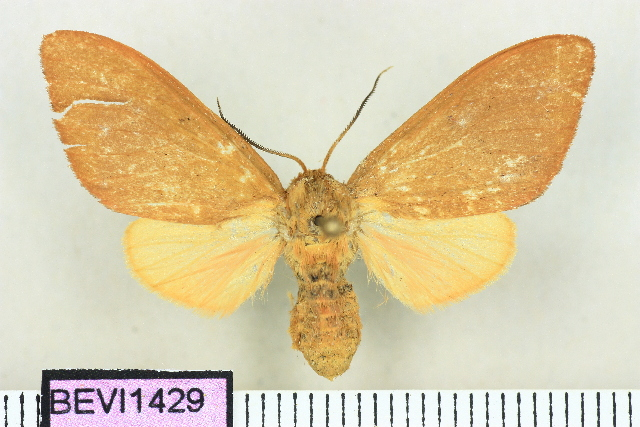

Scientific classification
- Domain: Eukaryota
- Kingdom: Animalia
- Phylum: Arthropoda
- Class: Insecta
- Order: Lepidoptera
- Superfamily: Noctuoidea
- Family: Erebidae
- Subfamily: Arctiinae
- Genus: Symphlebia
- Species: S. nigropunctata

Binomial name
- Symphlebia nigropunctata (Reich, 1935)

Synonyms
- Prumala nigropunctata Reich, 1935

= Symphlebia nigropunctata =

Species of moth

Symphlebia nigropunctata is a moth in the subfamily Arctiinae. It was described by Reich in 1935. It is found in Brazil.
