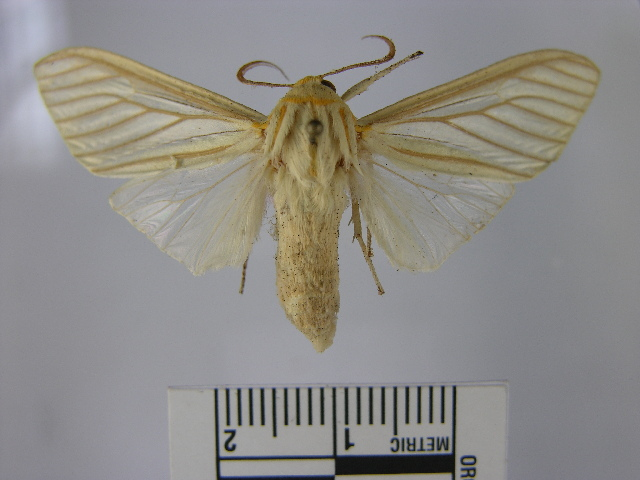

Scientific classification
- Domain: Eukaryota
- Kingdom: Animalia
- Phylum: Arthropoda
- Class: Insecta
- Order: Lepidoptera
- Superfamily: Noctuoidea
- Family: Erebidae
- Subfamily: Arctiinae
- Genus: Munona
- Species: M. iridescens

Binomial name
- Munona iridescens Schaus, 1894

= Munona iridescens =

Species of moth

Munona iridescens is a moth of the family Erebidae first described by William Schaus in 1894. It is found in Mexico, French Guiana, Venezuela, Peru, Brazil and Ecuador.
