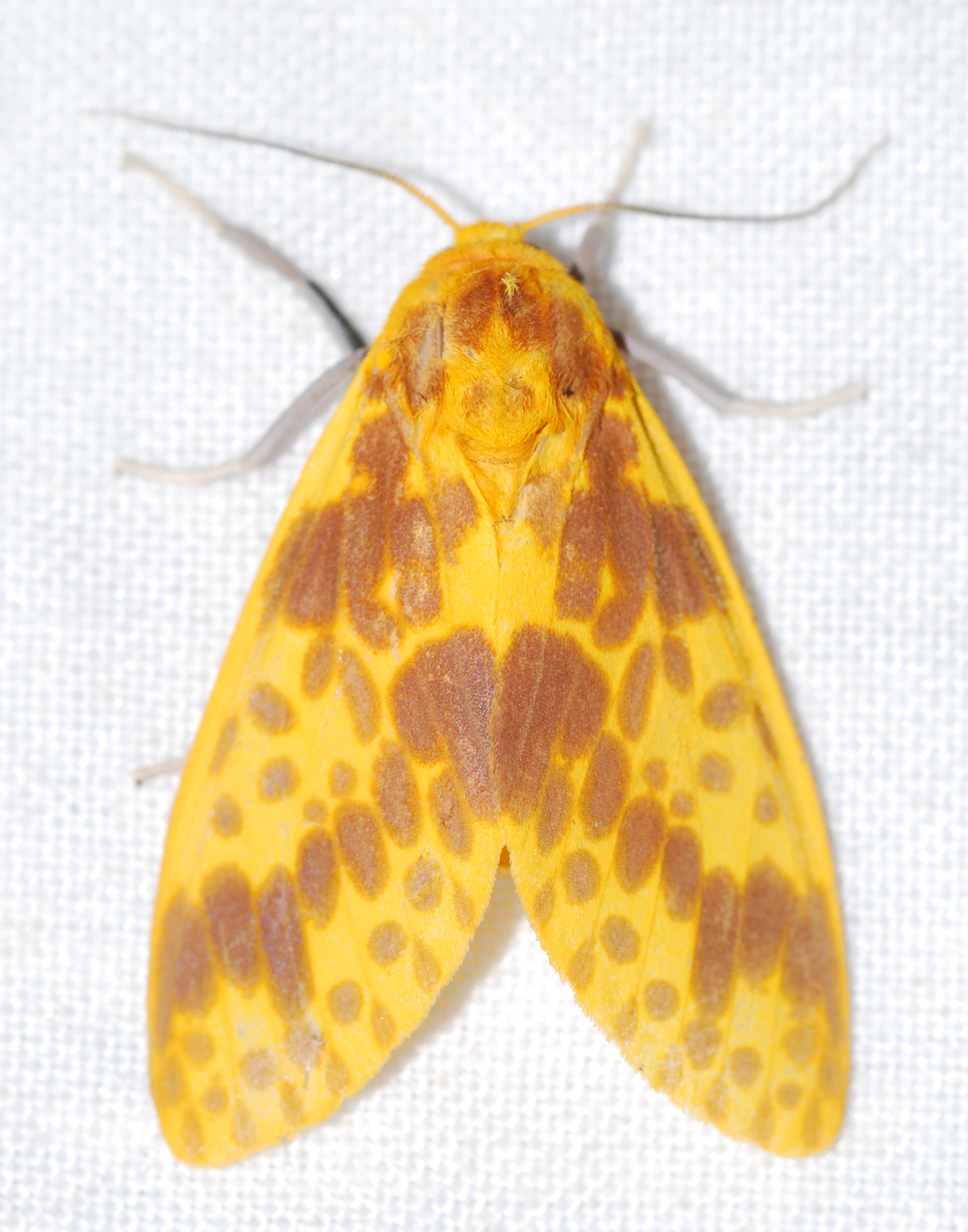

Scientific classification
- Domain: Eukaryota
- Kingdom: Animalia
- Phylum: Arthropoda
- Class: Insecta
- Order: Lepidoptera
- Superfamily: Noctuoidea
- Family: Erebidae
- Subfamily: Arctiinae
- Genus: Symphlebia
- Species: S. neja

Binomial name
- Symphlebia neja (Schaus, 1905)

Synonyms
- Idalus neja Schaus, 1905

= Symphlebia neja =

Species of moth

Symphlebia neja is a moth in the family Erebidae. It was described by William Schaus in 1905. It is found in French Guiana and the Brazilian state of Amazonas.
