= Symphlebia indistincta =

Scientific classification
- Domain: Eukaryota
- Kingdom: Animalia
- Phylum: Arthropoda
- Class: Insecta
- Order: Lepidoptera
- Superfamily: Noctuoidea
- Family: Erebidae
- Subfamily: Arctiinae
- Genus: Symphlebia
- Species: S. indistincta

Binomial name
- Symphlebia indistincta (Rothschild, 1909)

Synonyms
- Prumala indistincta Rothschild, 1909

Species of moth

Symphlebia indistincta is a moth in the family Erebidae. It was described by Walter Rothschild in 1909. It is found in Panama and Paraguay.
