= Symphlebia similis =

Scientific classification
- Domain: Eukaryota
- Kingdom: Animalia
- Phylum: Arthropoda
- Class: Insecta
- Order: Lepidoptera
- Superfamily: Noctuoidea
- Family: Erebidae
- Subfamily: Arctiinae
- Genus: Symphlebia
- Species: S. similis

Binomial name
- Symphlebia similis (Rothschild, 1917)

Synonyms
- Antaxia similis Rothschild, 1917

Species of moth

Symphlebia similis is a moth in the subfamily Arctiinae. It was described by Rothschild in 1917. It is found in Peru.
