= Symphlebia erratum =

Scientific classification
- Domain: Eukaryota
- Kingdom: Animalia
- Phylum: Arthropoda
- Class: Insecta
- Order: Lepidoptera
- Superfamily: Noctuoidea
- Family: Erebidae
- Subfamily: Arctiinae
- Genus: Symphlebia
- Species: S. erratum

Binomial name
- Symphlebia erratum (Schaus, 1933)

Synonyms
- Elysius erratum Schaus, 1933

Species of moth

Symphlebia erratum is a moth in the subfamily Arctiinae. It was described by Schaus in 1933. It is found in Venezuela.
