= Symphlebia doncasteri =

Scientific classification
- Domain: Eukaryota
- Kingdom: Animalia
- Phylum: Arthropoda
- Class: Insecta
- Order: Lepidoptera
- Superfamily: Noctuoidea
- Family: Erebidae
- Subfamily: Arctiinae
- Genus: Symphlebia
- Species: S. doncasteri

Binomial name
- Symphlebia doncasteri (Rothschild, 1910)

Synonyms
- Idalus doncasteri Rothschild, 1910

Species of moth

Symphlebia doncasteri is a moth in the family Erebidae. It was described by Walter Rothschild in 1910. It is found in Venezuela.
