= Symphlebia ignipicta =

Scientific classification
- Kingdom: Animalia
- Phylum: Arthropoda
- Class: Insecta
- Order: Lepidoptera
- Superfamily: Noctuoidea
- Family: Erebidae
- Subfamily: Arctiinae
- Genus: Symphlebia
- Species: S. ignipicta

Binomial name
- Symphlebia ignipicta (Hampson, 1903)

Synonyms
- Prumala ignipicta Hampson, 1903

Species of moth

Symphlebia ignipicta is a moth in the subfamily Arctiinae. It was described by George Hampson in 1903. It is found in Brazil.
