= Symphlebia citraria =

Scientific classification
- Domain: Eukaryota
- Kingdom: Animalia
- Phylum: Arthropoda
- Class: Insecta
- Order: Lepidoptera
- Superfamily: Noctuoidea
- Family: Erebidae
- Subfamily: Arctiinae
- Genus: Symphlebia
- Species: S. citraria

Binomial name
- Symphlebia citraria (Dognin, 1889)

Synonyms
- Idalus citraria Dognin, 1889

Species of moth

Symphlebia citraria is a moth in the family Erebidae. It was described by Paul Dognin in 1889. It is found in Ecuador, Venezuela and Peru.
