= Symphlebia meridionalis =

Scientific classification
- Domain: Eukaryota
- Kingdom: Animalia
- Phylum: Arthropoda
- Class: Insecta
- Order: Lepidoptera
- Superfamily: Noctuoidea
- Family: Erebidae
- Subfamily: Arctiinae
- Genus: Symphlebia
- Species: S. meridionalis

Binomial name
- Symphlebia meridionalis (Schaus, 1905)

Synonyms
- Antaxia meridionalis Schaus, 1905

Species of moth

Symphlebia meridionalis is a moth in the subfamily Arctiinae. It was described by Schaus in 1905. It is found in Peru.
