= Symphlebia jalapa =

Scientific classification
- Domain: Eukaryota
- Kingdom: Animalia
- Phylum: Arthropoda
- Class: Insecta
- Order: Lepidoptera
- Superfamily: Noctuoidea
- Family: Erebidae
- Subfamily: Arctiinae
- Genus: Symphlebia
- Species: S. jalapa

Binomial name
- Symphlebia jalapa (H. Druce, 1894)

Synonyms
- Halysidota jalapa H. Druce, 1894; Prumala jalapa

Species of moth

Symphlebia jalapa is a moth in the subfamily Arctiinae. It was described by Herbert Druce in 1894. It is found in Mexico.
