= Symphlebia geertsi =

Scientific classification
- Domain: Eukaryota
- Kingdom: Animalia
- Phylum: Arthropoda
- Class: Insecta
- Order: Lepidoptera
- Superfamily: Noctuoidea
- Family: Erebidae
- Subfamily: Arctiinae
- Genus: Symphlebia
- Species: S. geertsi

Binomial name
- Symphlebia geertsi (Hulstaert, 1924)

Synonyms
- Idalus geertsi Hulstaert, 1924

Species of moth

Symphlebia geertsi is a moth in the family Erebidae first described by Gustaaf Hulstaert in 1924. It is found in Brazil.
