= Symphlebia lophocampoides =

Scientific classification
- Domain: Eukaryota
- Kingdom: Animalia
- Phylum: Arthropoda
- Class: Insecta
- Order: Lepidoptera
- Superfamily: Noctuoidea
- Family: Erebidae
- Subfamily: Arctiinae
- Genus: Symphlebia
- Species: S. lophocampoides

Binomial name
- Symphlebia lophocampoides Felder & Rogenhofer, 1874

Synonyms
- Prumala lophocampoides

Species of moth

Symphlebia lophocampoides is a moth in the subfamily Arctiinae. It was described by Felder and Rogenhofer in 1874. It is found in Brazil.
