= Symphlebia suanoides =

Scientific classification
- Domain: Eukaryota
- Kingdom: Animalia
- Phylum: Arthropoda
- Class: Insecta
- Order: Lepidoptera
- Superfamily: Noctuoidea
- Family: Erebidae
- Subfamily: Arctiinae
- Genus: Symphlebia
- Species: S. suanoides

Binomial name
- Symphlebia suanoides (Schaus, 1921)

Synonyms
- Prumala suanoides Schaus, 1921

Species of moth

Symphlebia suanoides is a moth in the subfamily Arctiinae. It was described by Schaus in 1921. It can be found in Costa Rica.
