= Symphlebia foliosa =

Scientific classification
- Domain: Eukaryota
- Kingdom: Animalia
- Phylum: Arthropoda
- Class: Insecta
- Order: Lepidoptera
- Superfamily: Noctuoidea
- Family: Erebidae
- Subfamily: Arctiinae
- Genus: Symphlebia
- Species: S. foliosa

Binomial name
- Symphlebia foliosa (Seitz, 1921)

Synonyms
- Prumala foliosa Seitz, 1921

Species of moth

Symphlebia foliosa is a moth in the subfamily Arctiinae first described by Seitz in 1921. It is found in Bolivia.
