= Symphlebia tetrodonta =

Scientific classification
- Domain: Eukaryota
- Kingdom: Animalia
- Phylum: Arthropoda
- Class: Insecta
- Order: Lepidoptera
- Superfamily: Noctuoidea
- Family: Erebidae
- Subfamily: Arctiinae
- Genus: Symphlebia
- Species: S. tetrodonta

Binomial name
- Symphlebia tetrodonta (Dognin, 1911)

Synonyms
- Idalus tetrodonta Dognin, 1911; Symphlebia tetrodonta f. anodonta Seitz, 1921

Species of moth

Symphlebia tetrodonta is a moth in the family Erebidae. It was described by Paul Dognin in 1911. It is found in Venezuela.
