= Symphlebia tessellata =

Scientific classification
- Domain: Eukaryota
- Kingdom: Animalia
- Phylum: Arthropoda
- Class: Insecta
- Order: Lepidoptera
- Superfamily: Noctuoidea
- Family: Erebidae
- Subfamily: Arctiinae
- Genus: Symphlebia
- Species: S. tessellata

Binomial name
- Symphlebia tessellata (Schaus, 1910)

Synonyms
- Prumala tessellata Schaus, 1910; Prumala subtessellata Rothschild, 1916

Species of moth

Symphlebia tessellata is a moth in the subfamily Arctiinae. It was described by Schaus in 1910. It is found in Costa Rica and Venezuela.

== Subspecies ==
- Symphlebia tessellata tessellata (Costa Rica)
- Symphlebia tessellata subtessellata (Rothschild, 1916) (Venezuela)
