= Symphlebia maculicincta =

Scientific classification
- Kingdom: Animalia
- Phylum: Arthropoda
- Class: Insecta
- Order: Lepidoptera
- Superfamily: Noctuoidea
- Family: Erebidae
- Subfamily: Arctiinae
- Genus: Symphlebia
- Species: S. maculicincta

Binomial name
- Symphlebia maculicincta (Hampson, 1901)

Synonyms
- Prumala maculicincta Hampson, 1901

Species of moth

Symphlebia maculicincta is a moth in the subfamily Arctiinae. It was described by George Hampson in 1901. It is found in Brazil and Venezuela.
