= Symphlebia panema =

Scientific classification
- Kingdom: Animalia
- Phylum: Arthropoda
- Clade: Pancrustacea
- Class: Insecta
- Order: Lepidoptera
- Superfamily: Noctuoidea
- Family: Erebidae
- Subfamily: Arctiinae
- Genus: Symphlebia
- Species: S. panema

Binomial name
- Symphlebia panema (Dognin, 1923)

Synonyms
- Automolis panema Dognin, 1923

Species of moth

Symphlebia panema is a moth in the subfamily Arctiinae. It was described by Paul Dognin in 1923. It is found in Brazil.
