= Symphlebia underwoodi =

Scientific classification
- Domain: Eukaryota
- Kingdom: Animalia
- Phylum: Arthropoda
- Class: Insecta
- Order: Lepidoptera
- Superfamily: Noctuoidea
- Family: Erebidae
- Subfamily: Arctiinae
- Genus: Symphlebia
- Species: S. underwoodi

Binomial name
- Symphlebia underwoodi (Rothschild, 1910)

Synonyms
- Diacrisia underwoodi Rothschild, 1910

Species of moth

Symphlebia underwoodi is a moth in the subfamily Arctiinae. It was described by Rothschild in 1910. It is found in Costa Rica and Honduras.
