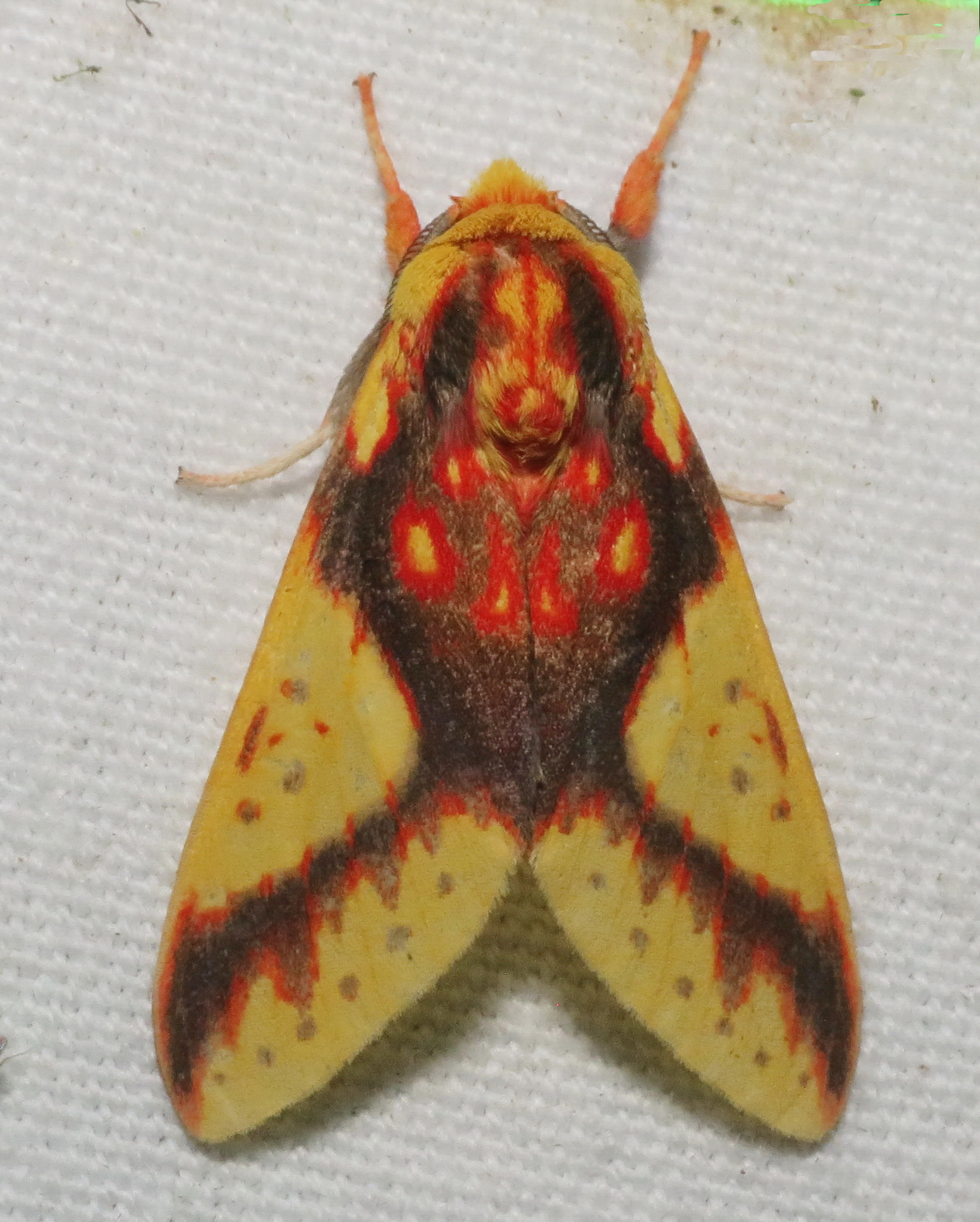
- In Costa Rica

Scientific classification
- Domain: Eukaryota
- Kingdom: Animalia
- Phylum: Arthropoda
- Class: Insecta
- Order: Lepidoptera
- Superfamily: Noctuoidea
- Family: Erebidae
- Subfamily: Arctiinae
- Genus: Symphlebia
- Species: S. ipsea

Binomial name
- Symphlebia ipsea (H. Druce, 1884)

Synonyms
- Mazaeras ipsea H. Druce, 1884; Prumala lophocampoides ipsea

= Symphlebia ipsea =

Species of moth

Symphlebia ipsea is a moth in the family Erebidae. It was described by Herbert Druce in 1884. It is found in Panama.
