= Symphlebia aryllis =

Scientific classification
- Kingdom: Animalia
- Phylum: Arthropoda
- Clade: Pancrustacea
- Class: Insecta
- Order: Lepidoptera
- Superfamily: Noctuoidea
- Family: Erebidae
- Subfamily: Arctiinae
- Genus: Symphlebia
- Species: S. aryllis

Binomial name
- Symphlebia aryllis Schaus, 1896

Species of moth

Symphlebia aryllis is a moth in the subfamily Arctiinae. It was described by William Schaus in 1896. It is found in Venezuela.

== Taxonomy ==
Symphlebia aryllis was described by William Schaus in 1896 from material collected at Aroa, Venezuela. The original description appeared in volume 4 of the Journal of the New York Entomological Society. The species was subsequently placed in the genus Prumala by Hampson in 1901, but later catalogues restored it to Symphlebia.

== Description ==
In the original description, Schaus described the body as orange-yellow and the forewings as bright yellow, with brown colouring along the outer portions of the veins and black along part of the subcostal vein.
