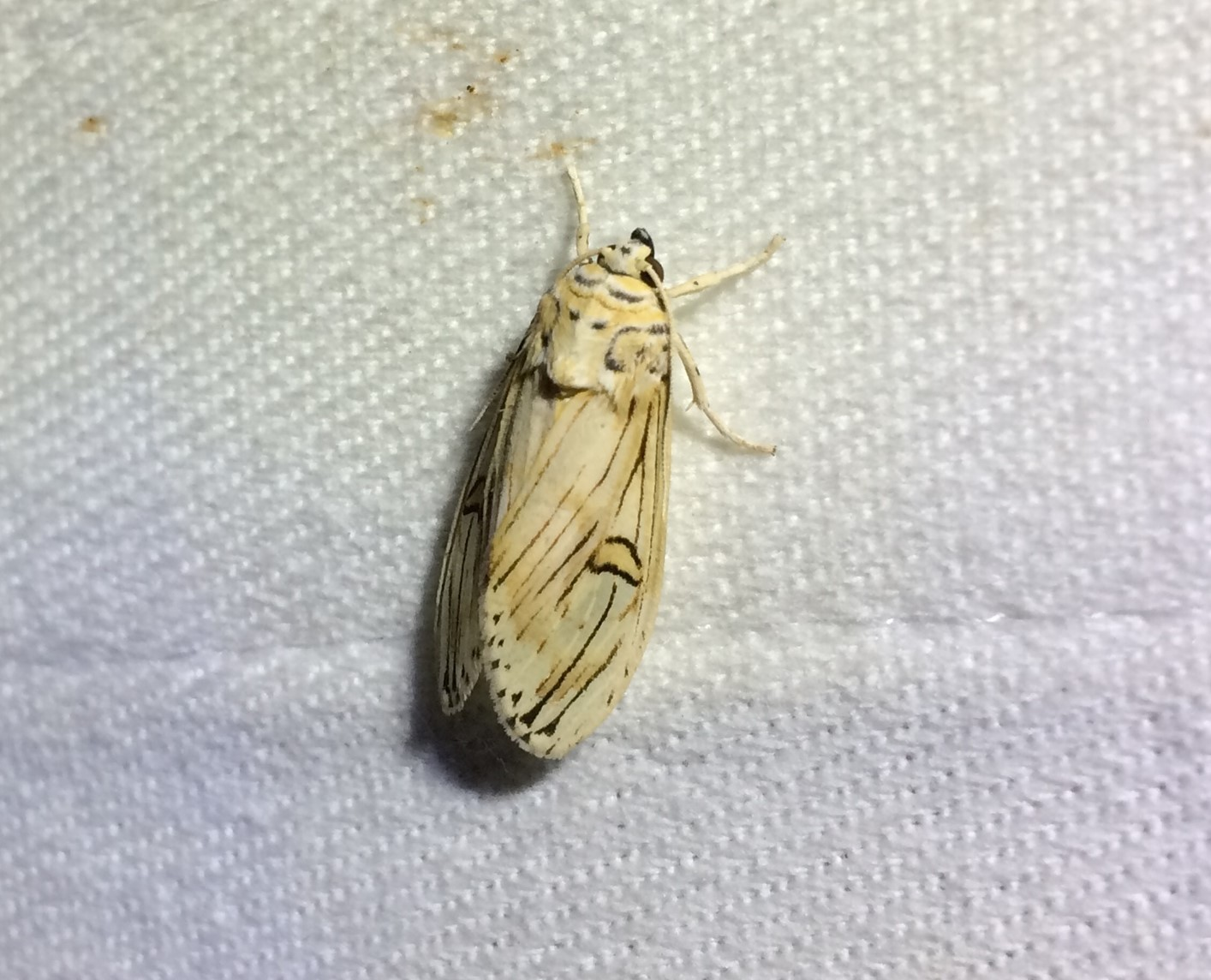

Scientific classification
- Domain: Eukaryota
- Kingdom: Animalia
- Phylum: Arthropoda
- Class: Insecta
- Order: Lepidoptera
- Superfamily: Noctuoidea
- Family: Erebidae
- Subfamily: Arctiinae
- Genus: Symphlebia
- Species: S. abdominalis

Binomial name
- Symphlebia abdominalis (Herrich-Schäffer, [1855])

Synonyms
- Syntomis abdominalis Herrich-Schäffer, [1855]; Antaxia abdominalis; Aphyle abdominalis (Herrich-Schäffer, [1855])

= Symphlebia abdominalis =

Species of insect

Symphlebia abdominalis is a moth in the subfamily Arctiinae. It was described by Gottlieb August Wilhelm Herrich-Schäffer in 1855. It is found in Brazil.
