= Symphlebia sulphurea =

Scientific classification
- Domain: Eukaryota
- Kingdom: Animalia
- Phylum: Arthropoda
- Class: Insecta
- Order: Lepidoptera
- Superfamily: Noctuoidea
- Family: Erebidae
- Subfamily: Arctiinae
- Genus: Symphlebia
- Species: S. sulphurea

Binomial name
- Symphlebia sulphurea (Joicey & Talbot, 1916)

Synonyms
- Prumala sulphurea Joicey & Talbot, 1916

Species of moth

Symphlebia sulphurea is a moth in the subfamily Arctiinae. It was described by James John Joicey and George Talbot in 1916. It is found in Peru.
