= Symphlebia suanus =

Scientific classification
- Domain: Eukaryota
- Kingdom: Animalia
- Phylum: Arthropoda
- Class: Insecta
- Order: Lepidoptera
- Superfamily: Noctuoidea
- Family: Erebidae
- Subfamily: Arctiinae
- Genus: Symphlebia
- Species: S. suanus

Binomial name
- Symphlebia suanus (H. Druce, 1902)

Synonyms
- Idalus suanus H. Druce, 1902; Prumala suanus

Species of moth

Symphlebia suanus is a moth in the family Erebidae. It was described by Herbert Druce in 1902. It is found in Peru and Venezuela.
