= Symphlebia fulminans =

Scientific classification
- Domain: Eukaryota
- Kingdom: Animalia
- Phylum: Arthropoda
- Class: Insecta
- Order: Lepidoptera
- Superfamily: Noctuoidea
- Family: Erebidae
- Subfamily: Arctiinae
- Genus: Symphlebia
- Species: S. fulminans

Binomial name
- Symphlebia fulminans (Rothschild, 1910)

Synonyms
- Prumala lophocampoides fulminans Rothschild, 1910

Species of moth

Symphlebia fulminans is a moth in the family Erebidae first described by Walter Rothschild in 1910. It is found in Peru and Venezuela.
