= Symphlebia herbosa =

Scientific classification
- Domain: Eukaryota
- Kingdom: Animalia
- Phylum: Arthropoda
- Class: Insecta
- Order: Lepidoptera
- Superfamily: Noctuoidea
- Family: Erebidae
- Subfamily: Arctiinae
- Genus: Symphlebia
- Species: S. herbosa

Binomial name
- Symphlebia herbosa (Schaus, 1910)

Synonyms
- Prumala herbosa Schaus, 1910

Species of moth

Symphlebia herbosa is a moth in the subfamily Arctiinae first described by Schaus in 1910. It is found in Costa Rica.
