= Symphlebia rosa =

Scientific classification
- Domain: Eukaryota
- Kingdom: Animalia
- Phylum: Arthropoda
- Class: Insecta
- Order: Lepidoptera
- Superfamily: Noctuoidea
- Family: Erebidae
- Subfamily: Arctiinae
- Genus: Symphlebia
- Species: S. rosa

Binomial name
- Symphlebia rosa (H. Druce, 1909)

Synonyms
- Automolis rosa H. Druce, 1909

Species of moth

Symphlebia rosa is a moth in the family Erebidae. It was described by Herbert Druce in 1909. It is found in Colombia.
