= Rhipha gagarini =

Scientific classification
- Domain: Eukaryota
- Kingdom: Animalia
- Phylum: Arthropoda
- Class: Insecta
- Order: Lepidoptera
- Superfamily: Noctuoidea
- Family: Erebidae
- Subfamily: Arctiinae
- Genus: Rhipha
- Species: R. gagarini

Binomial name
- Rhipha gagarini Travassos, 1955

Synonyms
- Rhipha gagarina Watson & Goodger, 1986

Species of moth

Rhipha gagarini is a moth in the family Erebidae. It was described by Travassos in 1955. It is found in Brazil.
