= Rhipha vivia =

Scientific classification
- Domain: Eukaryota
- Kingdom: Animalia
- Phylum: Arthropoda
- Class: Insecta
- Order: Lepidoptera
- Superfamily: Noctuoidea
- Family: Erebidae
- Subfamily: Arctiinae
- Genus: Rhipha
- Species: R. vivia

Binomial name
- Rhipha vivia Watson, 1975

Synonyms
- Automolis spitzi Rothschild, 1937 (preocc. Rothschild, 1935)

Species of moth

Rhipha vivia is a moth in the family Erebidae. It was described by Watson in 1975. It is found in Brazil.
