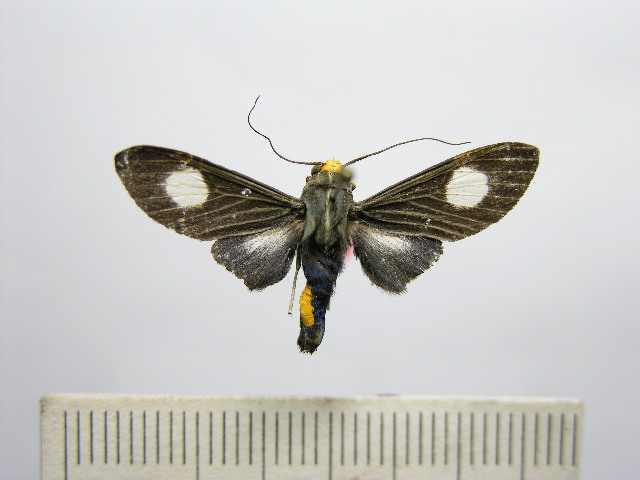

Scientific classification
- Domain: Eukaryota
- Kingdom: Animalia
- Phylum: Arthropoda
- Class: Insecta
- Order: Lepidoptera
- Superfamily: Noctuoidea
- Family: Erebidae
- Subfamily: Arctiinae
- Genus: Rhipha
- Species: R. albiplaga

Binomial name
- Rhipha albiplaga (Schaus, 1905)

Synonyms
- Automolis albiplaga Schaus, 1905; Automolis uniformis Rothschild, 1909; Rhipha uniformis (Rothschild, 1909)

= Rhipha albiplaga =

Species of moth

Rhipha albiplaga is a moth in the family Erebidae. William Schaus first described it in 1905. It is found in French Guiana and Amazonas.
