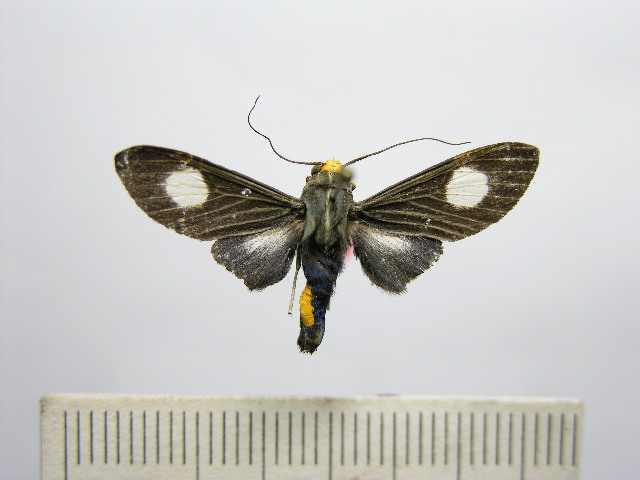
- Rhipha albiplaga

Scientific classification
- Kingdom: Animalia
- Phylum: Arthropoda
- Class: Insecta
- Order: Lepidoptera
- Superfamily: Noctuoidea
- Family: Erebidae
- Subfamily: Arctiinae
- Subtribe: Phaegopterina
- Genus: Rhipha; Walker, 1854

= Rhipha =

Genus of moths

Rhipha is a genus of moths in the family Erebidae. The genus was erected by Francis Walker in 1854.

== Species ==
- Rhipha albiplaga Schaus, 1905
- Rhipha chionoplaga Dognin, 1913
- Rhipha flammans Hampson, 1901
- Rhipha flammula Hayward, 1947
- Rhipha flavoplaga Schaus, 1905
- Rhipha flavoplagiata Rothschild, 1911
- Rhipha fulminans Rothschild, 1916
- Rhipha gagarini Travassos, 1955
- Rhipha ignea Grados & Ramírez, 2016
- Rhipha leucoplaga Dognin, 1910
- Rhipha luteoplaga Rothschild, 1922
- Rhipha mathildae Köhler, 1926
- Rhipha niveomaculata Rothschild, 1909
- Rhipha perflammans Dognin, 1914
- Rhipha persimilis Rothschild, 1909
- Rhipha pulcherrima Rothschild, 1935
- Rhipha strigosa Walker, 1854
- Rhipha subflammans Rothschild, 1909
- Rhipha vivia Watson, 1975

== Former species ==
- Rhipha uniformis Rothschild, 1909
