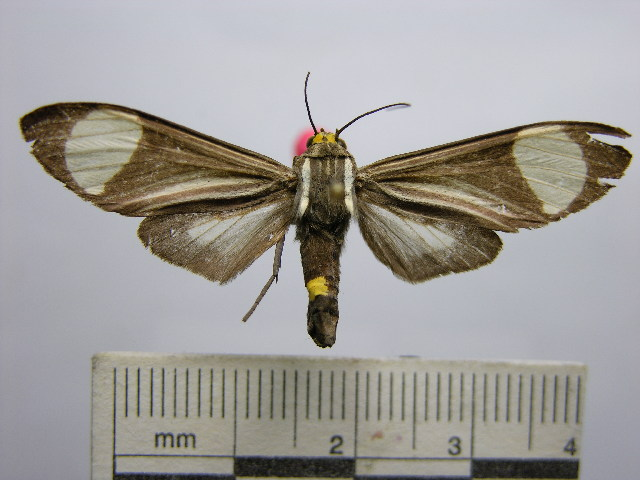

Scientific classification
- Domain: Eukaryota
- Kingdom: Animalia
- Phylum: Arthropoda
- Class: Insecta
- Order: Lepidoptera
- Superfamily: Noctuoidea
- Family: Erebidae
- Subfamily: Arctiinae
- Genus: Rhipha
- Species: R. leucoplaga

Binomial name
- Rhipha leucoplaga (Dognin, 1910)

Synonyms
- Automolis leucoplaga Dognin, 1910

= Rhipha leucoplaga =

Species of moth

Rhipha leucoplaga is a moth in the family Erebidae. It was described by Paul Dognin in 1910. It is found in French Guiana and Venezuela.
