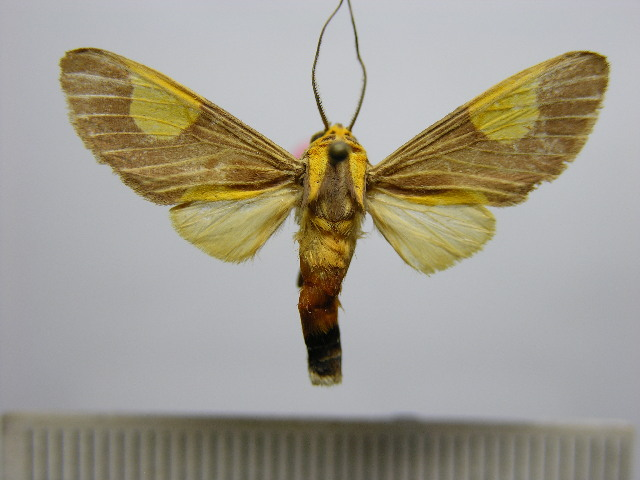
- Rhipha persimilis persimilis

Scientific classification
- Domain: Eukaryota
- Kingdom: Animalia
- Phylum: Arthropoda
- Class: Insecta
- Order: Lepidoptera
- Superfamily: Noctuoidea
- Family: Erebidae
- Subfamily: Arctiinae
- Genus: Rhipha
- Species: R. persimilis

Binomial name
- Rhipha persimilis (Rothschild, 1909)

Synonyms
- Automolis persimilis Rothschild, 1909; Automolis persimilis marginata Rothschild, 1909

= Rhipha persimilis =

Species of moth

Rhipha persimilis is a moth in the family Erebidae. It was described by Walter Rothschild in 1909. It is found in Costa Rica, French Guiana, Ecuador and Peru.

== Subspecies ==
- Rhipha persimilis persimilis
- Rhipha persimilis marginata (Rothschild, 1909) (Costa Rica)
