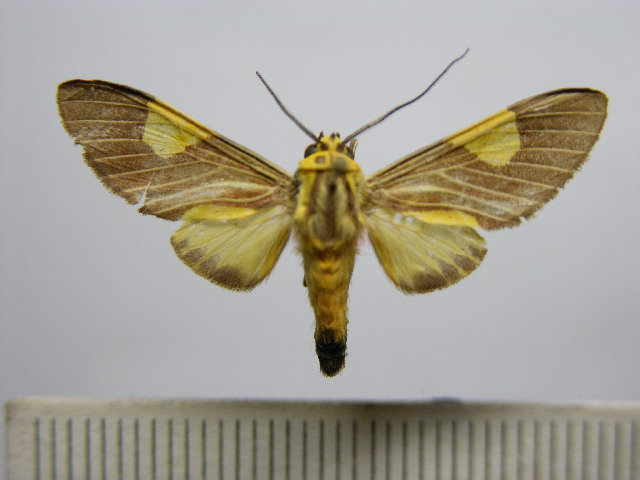

Scientific classification
- Domain: Eukaryota
- Kingdom: Animalia
- Phylum: Arthropoda
- Class: Insecta
- Order: Lepidoptera
- Superfamily: Noctuoidea
- Family: Erebidae
- Subfamily: Arctiinae
- Genus: Rhipha
- Species: R. flavoplagiata

Binomial name
- Rhipha flavoplagiata (Rothschild, 1911)

Synonyms
- Automolis flavoplagiata Rothschild, 1911; Rhipha flavithorax Joicey & Talbot, 1918

= Rhipha flavoplagiata =

Species of moth

Rhipha flavoplagiata is a moth in the family Erebidae. It was described by Walter Rothschild in 1911. It is found in Colombia.
