= Rhipha chionoplaga =

Scientific classification
- Domain: Eukaryota
- Kingdom: Animalia
- Phylum: Arthropoda
- Class: Insecta
- Order: Lepidoptera
- Superfamily: Noctuoidea
- Family: Erebidae
- Subfamily: Arctiinae
- Genus: Rhipha
- Species: R. chionoplaga

Binomial name
- Rhipha chionoplaga (Dognin, 1913)

Synonyms
- Automolis chionoplaga Dognin, 1913

Species of moth

Rhipha chionoplaga is a moth in the family Erebidae. It was described by Paul Dognin in 1913. It is found in Panama.
