= Rhipha flammula =

Scientific classification
- Domain: Eukaryota
- Kingdom: Animalia
- Phylum: Arthropoda
- Class: Insecta
- Order: Lepidoptera
- Superfamily: Noctuoidea
- Family: Erebidae
- Subfamily: Arctiinae
- Genus: Rhipha
- Species: R. flammula

Binomial name
- Rhipha flammula (Hayward, 1947)

Synonyms
- Automolis flammula Hayward, 1947

Species of moth

Rhipha flammula is a moth in the family Erebidae. It was described by Kenneth John Hayward in 1947. It is found in Argentina.
