= Rhipha flavoplaga =

Scientific classification
- Domain: Eukaryota
- Kingdom: Animalia
- Phylum: Arthropoda
- Class: Insecta
- Order: Lepidoptera
- Superfamily: Noctuoidea
- Family: Erebidae
- Subfamily: Arctiinae
- Genus: Rhipha
- Species: R. flavoplaga

Binomial name
- Rhipha flavoplaga (Schaus, 1905)

Synonyms
- Idalus flavoplaga Schaus, 1906

Species of moth

Rhipha flavoplaga is a moth in the family Erebidae. It was described by William Schaus in 1905. It is found in French Guiana, Venezuela, Bolivia and Ecuador.
