= Rhipha mathildae =

Scientific classification
- Domain: Eukaryota
- Kingdom: Animalia
- Phylum: Arthropoda
- Class: Insecta
- Order: Lepidoptera
- Superfamily: Noctuoidea
- Family: Erebidae
- Subfamily: Arctiinae
- Genus: Rhipha
- Species: R. mathildae

Binomial name
- Rhipha mathildae (Köhler, 1926)

Synonyms
- Automolis mathildae Köhler, 1924

Species of moth

Rhipha mathildae is a moth in the family Erebidae. It was described by Paul Köhler in 1926. It is found in Argentina.
