= Rhipha strigosa =

Scientific classification
- Kingdom: Animalia
- Phylum: Arthropoda
- Class: Insecta
- Order: Lepidoptera
- Superfamily: Noctuoidea
- Family: Erebidae
- Subfamily: Arctiinae
- Genus: Rhipha
- Species: R. strigosa

Binomial name
- Rhipha strigosa (Walker, 1854)

Synonyms
- Euchromia strigosa Walker, 1854; Eucyrta subulifera Felder, 1874

Species of moth

Rhipha strigosa is a moth in the family Erebidae. It was described by Francis Walker in 1854. It is found in French Guiana, Panama, Venezuela and the Brazilian states of Pará, Rio de Janeiro and Amazonas.
