= Rhipha fulminans =

Scientific classification
- Domain: Eukaryota
- Kingdom: Animalia
- Phylum: Arthropoda
- Class: Insecta
- Order: Lepidoptera
- Superfamily: Noctuoidea
- Family: Erebidae
- Subfamily: Arctiinae
- Genus: Rhipha
- Species: R. fulminans

Binomial name
- Rhipha fulminans (Rothschild, 1916)

Synonyms
- Automolis fulminans Rothschild, 1916

Species of moth

Rhipha fulminans is a moth in the family Erebidae. It was described by Walter Rothschild in 1916. It is found in Brazil.
