= Rhipha pulcherrima =

Scientific classification
- Domain: Eukaryota
- Kingdom: Animalia
- Phylum: Arthropoda
- Class: Insecta
- Order: Lepidoptera
- Superfamily: Noctuoidea
- Family: Erebidae
- Subfamily: Arctiinae
- Genus: Rhipha
- Species: R. pulcherrima

Binomial name
- Rhipha pulcherrima (Rothschild, 1935)

Synonyms
- Automolis pulcherrima Rothschild, 1935; Rhipha olafi Gagarin, 1967

Species of moth

Rhipha pulcherrima is a moth in the family Erebidae. It was described by Walter Rothschild in 1935. It is found in Brazil.
