= Rhipha perflammans =

Scientific classification
- Domain: Eukaryota
- Kingdom: Animalia
- Phylum: Arthropoda
- Class: Insecta
- Order: Lepidoptera
- Superfamily: Noctuoidea
- Family: Erebidae
- Subfamily: Arctiinae
- Genus: Rhipha
- Species: R. perflammans

Binomial name
- Rhipha perflammans (Dognin, 1914)

Synonyms
- Automolis perflammans Dognin, 1914

Species of moth

Rhipha perflammans is a moth in the family Erebidae. It was described by Paul Dognin in 1914. It is found in French Guiana.
