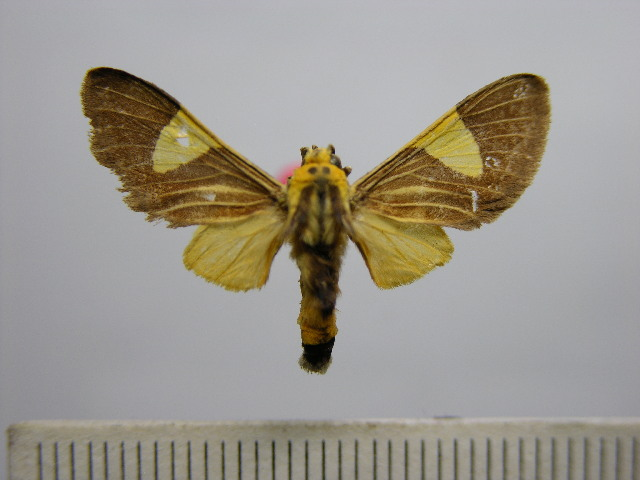

Scientific classification
- Domain: Eukaryota
- Kingdom: Animalia
- Phylum: Arthropoda
- Class: Insecta
- Order: Lepidoptera
- Superfamily: Noctuoidea
- Family: Erebidae
- Subfamily: Arctiinae
- Genus: Rhipha
- Species: R. luteoplaga

Binomial name
- Rhipha luteoplaga (Rothschild, 1922)

Synonyms
- Automolis luteoplaga Rothschild, 1922

= Rhipha luteoplaga =

Species of moth

Rhipha luteoplaga is a moth in the family Erebidae. It was described by Walter Rothschild in 1922. It is found in Brazil.
