= Rhipha flammans =

Scientific classification
- Kingdom: Animalia
- Phylum: Arthropoda
- Class: Insecta
- Order: Lepidoptera
- Superfamily: Noctuoidea
- Family: Erebidae
- Subfamily: Arctiinae
- Genus: Rhipha
- Species: R. flammans

Binomial name
- Rhipha flammans (Hampson, 1901)

Synonyms
- Automolis flammans Hampson, 1901

Species of moth

Rhipha flammans is a moth in the family Erebidae. It was described by George Hampson in 1901. It is found in Colombia, Brazil, French Guiana, Guyana, Ecuador, Peru and Bolivia.
