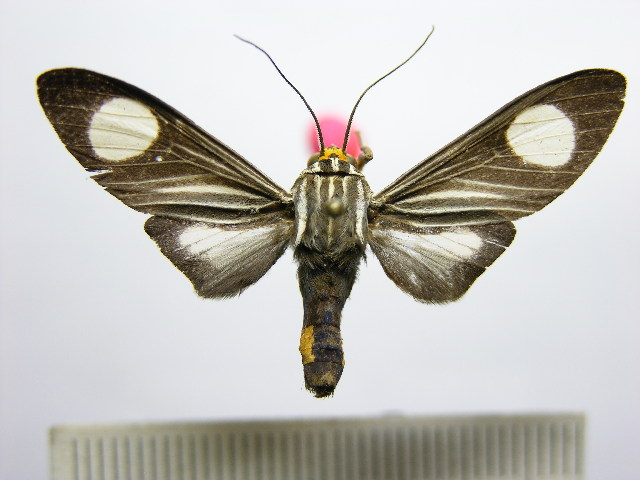

Scientific classification
- Domain: Eukaryota
- Kingdom: Animalia
- Phylum: Arthropoda
- Class: Insecta
- Order: Lepidoptera
- Superfamily: Noctuoidea
- Family: Erebidae
- Subfamily: Arctiinae
- Genus: Rhipha
- Species: R. niveomaculata

Binomial name
- Rhipha niveomaculata (Rothschild, 1909)

Synonyms
- Automolis niveomaculata Rothschild, 1909

= Rhipha niveomaculata =

Species of moth

Rhipha niveomaculata is a moth in the family Erebidae. It was described by Walter Rothschild in 1909. It is found in Peru.
