= Eudesmia trisigna =

Scientific classification
- Kingdom: Animalia
- Phylum: Arthropoda
- Class: Insecta
- Order: Lepidoptera
- Superfamily: Noctuoidea
- Family: Erebidae
- Subfamily: Arctiinae
- Genus: Eudesmia
- Species: E. trisigna

Binomial name
- Eudesmia trisigna (Walker, 1854)

Synonyms
- Cisthene trisigna

Species of moth

Eudesmia trisigna is a moth of the family Erebidae first described by Francis Walker in 1854. It is found in Venezuela.
