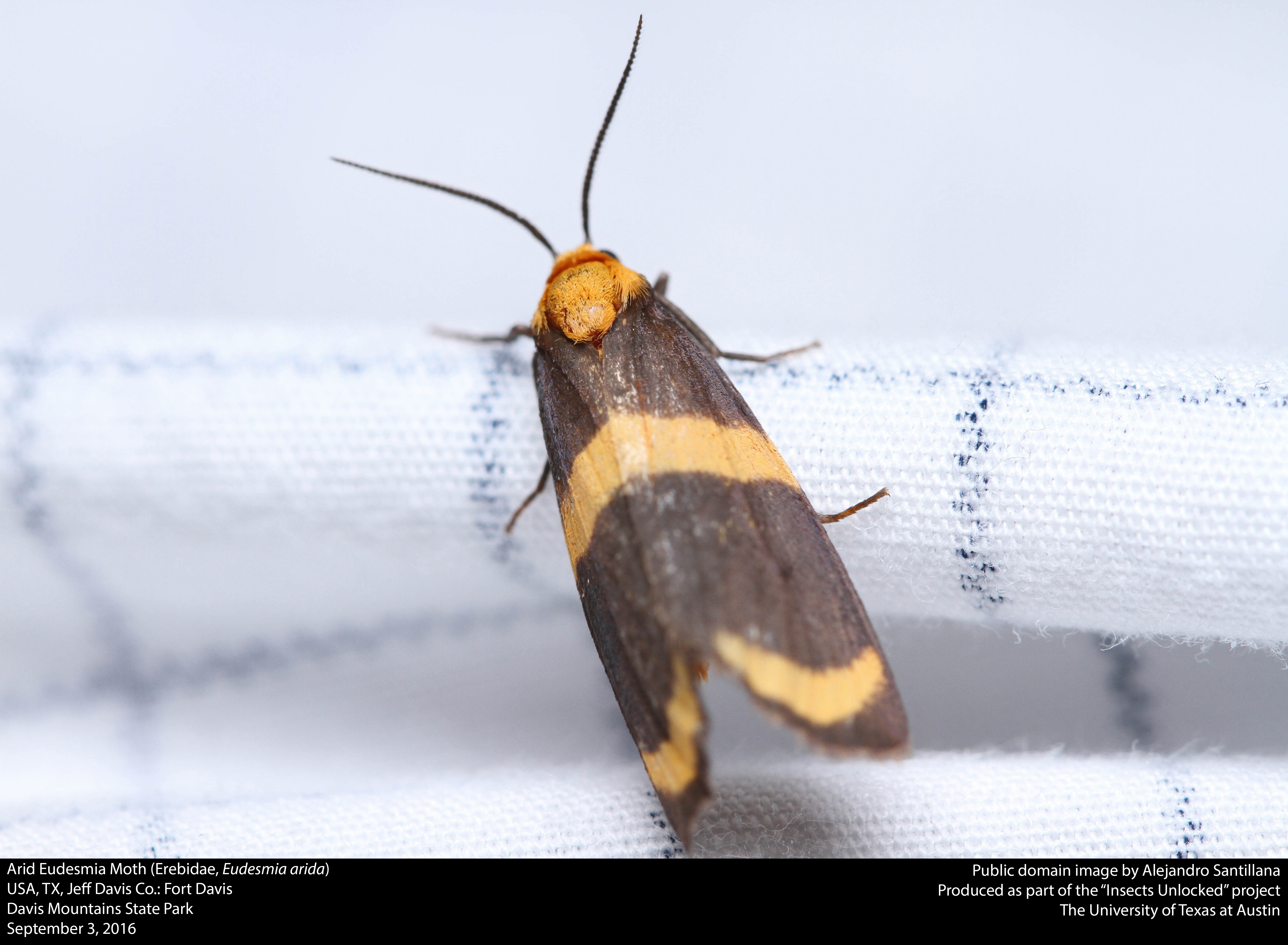
- Eudesmia arida

Scientific classification
- Kingdom: Animalia
- Phylum: Arthropoda
- Clade: Pancrustacea
- Class: Insecta
- Order: Lepidoptera
- Superfamily: Noctuoidea
- Family: Erebidae
- Subfamily: Arctiinae
- Tribe: Lithosiini
- Subtribe: Eudesmiina
- Genus: Eudesmia; Hübner, [1823]

Synonyms
- Ruscino Walker, 1854; Gerba Walker, [1865]

= Eudesmia =

Genus of moths

Eudesmia is a genus of lichen moths in the monotypic subtribe Eudesmiina of the family Erebidae. The genus was erected by Jacob Hübner in 1823.

== Species ==
- Eudesmia arida (Skinner, 1906) – arid eudesmia moth
- Eudesmia laetifera (Walker, [1865])
- Eudesmia loccea (Schaus, 1921)
- Eudesmia lunaris (Walker, 1864)
- Eudesmia major Rothschild, 1912
- Eudesmia menea (Drury, 1782)
- Eudesmia mina (Guerin, 1844)
- Eudesmia monon Dyar, 1917
- Eudesmia praxis (Druce, 1894)
- Eudesmia prusias (Druce, 1894)
- Eudesmia quadrifasciata (Walker, [1865])
- Eudesmia ruficollis (Donovan, 1798)
- Eudesmia tehuacana Dyar, 1917
- Eudesmia trisigna (Walker, 1854)
- Eudesmia unicincta (Hampson, 1900)
