= Eudesmia laetifera =

Scientific classification
- Kingdom: Animalia
- Phylum: Arthropoda
- Class: Insecta
- Order: Lepidoptera
- Superfamily: Noctuoidea
- Family: Erebidae
- Subfamily: Arctiinae
- Genus: Eudesmia
- Species: E. laetifera

Binomial name
- Eudesmia laetifera (Walker, [1865])

Synonyms
- Ruscina laetifera Walker, [1865]; Ruscino latifasciatus Butler, 1875

Species of moth

Eudesmia laetifera is a moth of the subfamily Arctiinae first described by Francis Walker in 1865. It is found in Mexico, Guatemala, Panama and Colombia.
