= Eudesmia ruficollis =

Scientific classification
- Domain: Eukaryota
- Kingdom: Animalia
- Phylum: Arthropoda
- Class: Insecta
- Order: Lepidoptera
- Superfamily: Noctuoidea
- Family: Erebidae
- Subfamily: Arctiinae
- Genus: Eudesmia
- Species: E. ruficollis

Binomial name
- Eudesmia ruficollis (Donovan, 1798)

Synonyms
- Sphinx ruficollis Donovan, 1798

Species of moth

Eudesmia ruficollis is a moth of the subfamily Arctiinae first described by Edward Donovan in 1798. It is found in Brazil and Argentina.
