= Eudesmia tehuacana =

Scientific classification
- Kingdom: Animalia
- Phylum: Arthropoda
- Class: Insecta
- Order: Lepidoptera
- Superfamily: Noctuoidea
- Family: Erebidae
- Subfamily: Arctiinae
- Genus: Eudesmia
- Species: E. tehuacana

Binomial name
- Eudesmia tehuacana Dyar, 1917

Species of moth

Eudesmia tehuacana is a moth of the subfamily Arctiinae. It is found in Mexico.
