= Eudesmia mina =

Scientific classification
- Domain: Eukaryota
- Kingdom: Animalia
- Phylum: Arthropoda
- Class: Insecta
- Order: Lepidoptera
- Superfamily: Noctuoidea
- Family: Erebidae
- Subfamily: Arctiinae
- Genus: Eudesmia
- Species: E. mina

Binomial name
- Eudesmia mina (Guerin, 1844)

Synonyms
- Lithosia mina Guerin, 1844

Species of moth

Eudesmia mina is a moth of the subfamily Arctiinae. It is found in Bolivia.
