= Eudesmia prusias =

Scientific classification
- Domain: Eukaryota
- Kingdom: Animalia
- Phylum: Arthropoda
- Class: Insecta
- Order: Lepidoptera
- Superfamily: Noctuoidea
- Family: Erebidae
- Subfamily: Arctiinae
- Genus: Eudesmia
- Species: E. prusias

Binomial name
- Eudesmia prusias (Druce, 1894)

Synonyms
- Ruscino prusias Druce, 1894

Species of moth

Eudesmia prusias is a moth of the subfamily Arctiinae. It is found in Mexico.
