= Eudesmia lunaris =

Scientific classification
- Kingdom: Animalia
- Phylum: Arthropoda
- Class: Insecta
- Order: Lepidoptera
- Superfamily: Noctuoidea
- Family: Erebidae
- Subfamily: Arctiinae
- Genus: Eudesmia
- Species: E. lunaris

Binomial name
- Eudesmia lunaris (Walker, 1864)

Synonyms
- Cisthene lunaris; Ruscino lunaris

Species of moth

Eudesmia lunaris is a moth of the family Erebidae first described by Francis Walker in 1864. It is found in Colombia.
