= Eudesmia loccea =

Scientific classification
- Domain: Eukaryota
- Kingdom: Animalia
- Phylum: Arthropoda
- Class: Insecta
- Order: Lepidoptera
- Superfamily: Noctuoidea
- Family: Erebidae
- Subfamily: Arctiinae
- Genus: Eudesmia
- Species: E. loccea

Binomial name
- Eudesmia loccea (Schaus, 1921)

Synonyms
- Cisthene loccea Schaus, 1921

Species of moth

Eudesmia loccea is a moth of the subfamily Arctiinae. It is found in Guatemala.
