= Eudesmia quadrifasciata =

Scientific classification
- Kingdom: Animalia
- Phylum: Arthropoda
- Class: Insecta
- Order: Lepidoptera
- Superfamily: Noctuoidea
- Family: Erebidae
- Subfamily: Arctiinae
- Genus: Eudesmia
- Species: E. quadrifasciata

Binomial name
- Eudesmia quadrifasciata (Walker, [1865])

Synonyms
- Gerba quadrifasciata Walker, [1865]

Species of moth

Eudesmia quadrifasciata is a moth of the subfamily Arctiinae first described by Francis Walker in 1865. It is found in Mexico.
