= Eudesmia major =

Scientific classification
- Domain: Eukaryota
- Kingdom: Animalia
- Phylum: Arthropoda
- Class: Insecta
- Order: Lepidoptera
- Superfamily: Noctuoidea
- Family: Erebidae
- Subfamily: Arctiinae
- Genus: Eudesmia
- Species: E. major

Binomial name
- Eudesmia major Rothschild, 1912

Species of moth

Eudesmia major is a moth of the subfamily Arctiinae. It is found in Panama.
