= Eudesmia monon =

Scientific classification
- Kingdom: Animalia
- Phylum: Arthropoda
- Class: Insecta
- Order: Lepidoptera
- Superfamily: Noctuoidea
- Family: Erebidae
- Subfamily: Arctiinae
- Genus: Eudesmia
- Species: E. monon

Binomial name
- Eudesmia monon Dyar, 1917

Species of moth

Eudesmia monon is a moth of the subfamily Arctiinae. It is found in Venezuela.
