= Eudesmia unicincta =

Scientific classification
- Kingdom: Animalia
- Phylum: Arthropoda
- Class: Insecta
- Order: Lepidoptera
- Superfamily: Noctuoidea
- Family: Erebidae
- Subfamily: Arctiinae
- Genus: Eudesmia
- Species: E. unicincta

Binomial name
- Eudesmia unicincta (Hampson, 1900)

Synonyms
- Cisthene unicincta

Species of moth

Eudesmia unicincta is a moth of the family Erebidae first described by George Hampson in 1900. It is found in Colombia.
