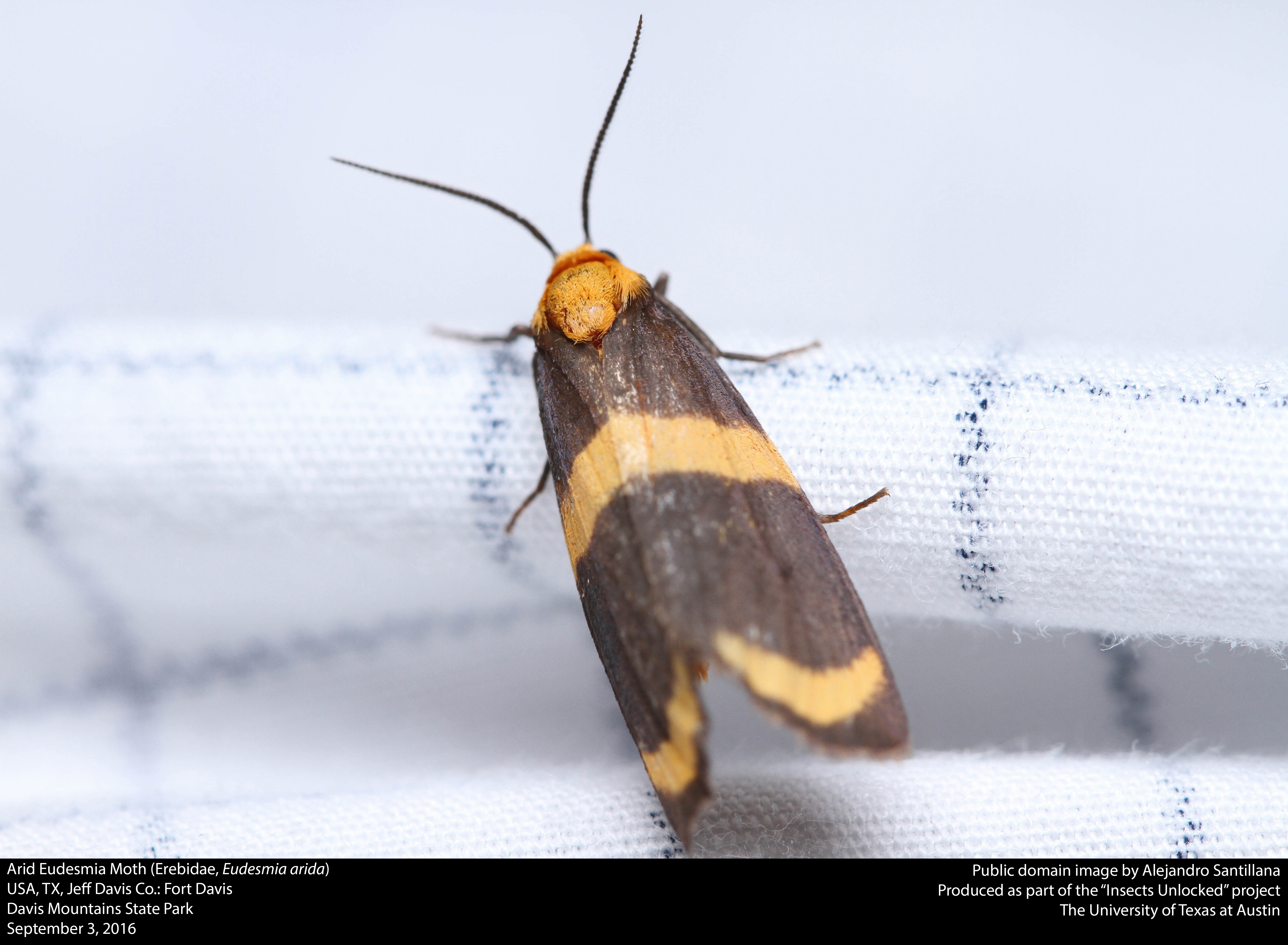

Scientific classification
- Domain: Eukaryota
- Kingdom: Animalia
- Phylum: Arthropoda
- Class: Insecta
- Order: Lepidoptera
- Superfamily: Noctuoidea
- Family: Erebidae
- Subfamily: Arctiinae
- Genus: Eudesmia
- Species: E. arida

Binomial name
- Eudesmia arida (Skinner, 1906)

Synonyms
- Ruscino arida Skinner, 1906; Eucyclopera arida

= Eudesmia arida =

Species of moth

Eudesmia arida, the arid eudesmia moth, is a moth of the family Erebidae. It was described by Skinner in 1906. It is found from Arizona to Texas in the United States and in Mexico.

Its wingspan is 23–30 mm. Adults have been recorded on wing from June to October.

The larvae feed on lichens.
