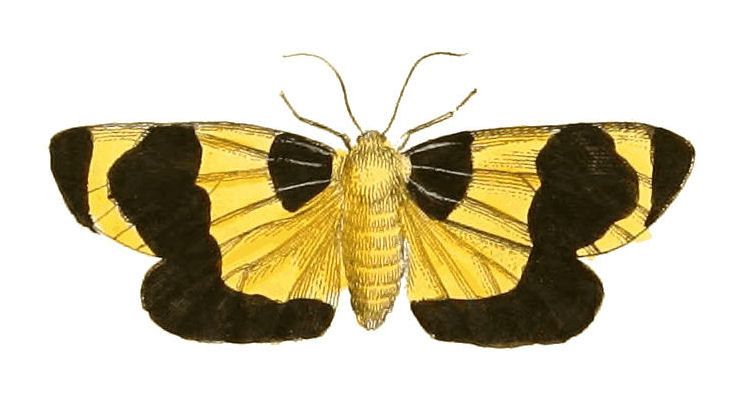
- Illustration by Drury

Scientific classification
- Domain: Eukaryota
- Kingdom: Animalia
- Phylum: Arthropoda
- Class: Insecta
- Order: Lepidoptera
- Superfamily: Noctuoidea
- Family: Erebidae
- Subfamily: Arctiinae
- Genus: Eudesmia
- Species: E. menea

Binomial name
- Eudesmia menea (Drury, 1782)

Synonyms
- Phalaena menea Drury, 1782; Ruscino menea; Cisthene menea; Ruscino arctifascia Butler, 1877

= Eudesmia menea =

Species of moth

Eudesmia menea, the lunar eudesmia, is a moth of the subfamily Arctiinae. It was described by Drury in 1782. It is found from Brazil and Colombia, through Central America (Mexico, Guatemala, Nicaragua, Honduras), to the southern United States, where it is found from southern Texas to Florida.

== Description ==
Upperside: antennae filiform (threadlike) and black. Head, thorax, and abdomen yellow. Wings yellow and black. Anterior having two round black spots at the shoulders, and two long ones at the tips. Posterior having a broad black border, beginning at the abdominal corners and running round the wings, crossing the fore wings and ending at the anterior edges.

Underside: palpi and tongue black. Legs black. Breast and abdomen yellow. Wings coloured as on the upperside. Margins of the wings entire. Wingspan 2 inches (50 mm).
