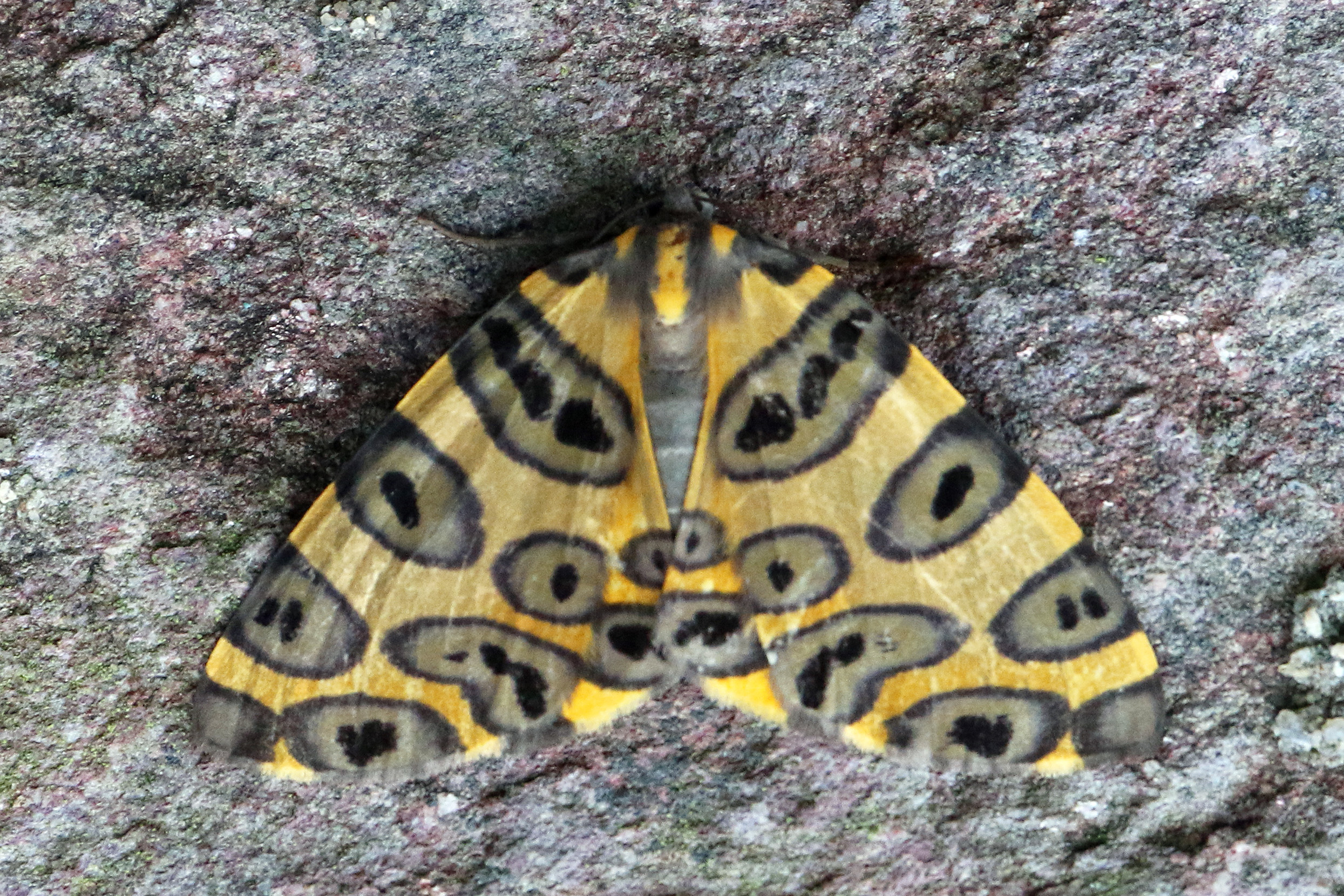
- Pantherodes pardalaria in São Paulo

Scientific classification
- Kingdom: Animalia
- Phylum: Arthropoda
- Class: Insecta
- Order: Lepidoptera
- Family: Geometridae
- Genus: Pantherodes
- Species: P. pardalaria

Binomial name
- Pantherodes pardalaria (Hübner, 1823)

Synonyms
- Panthera pardalaria Hübner, [1823]; Phalaena perspicillum Perty 1833

= Pantherodes pardalaria =

Species of moth

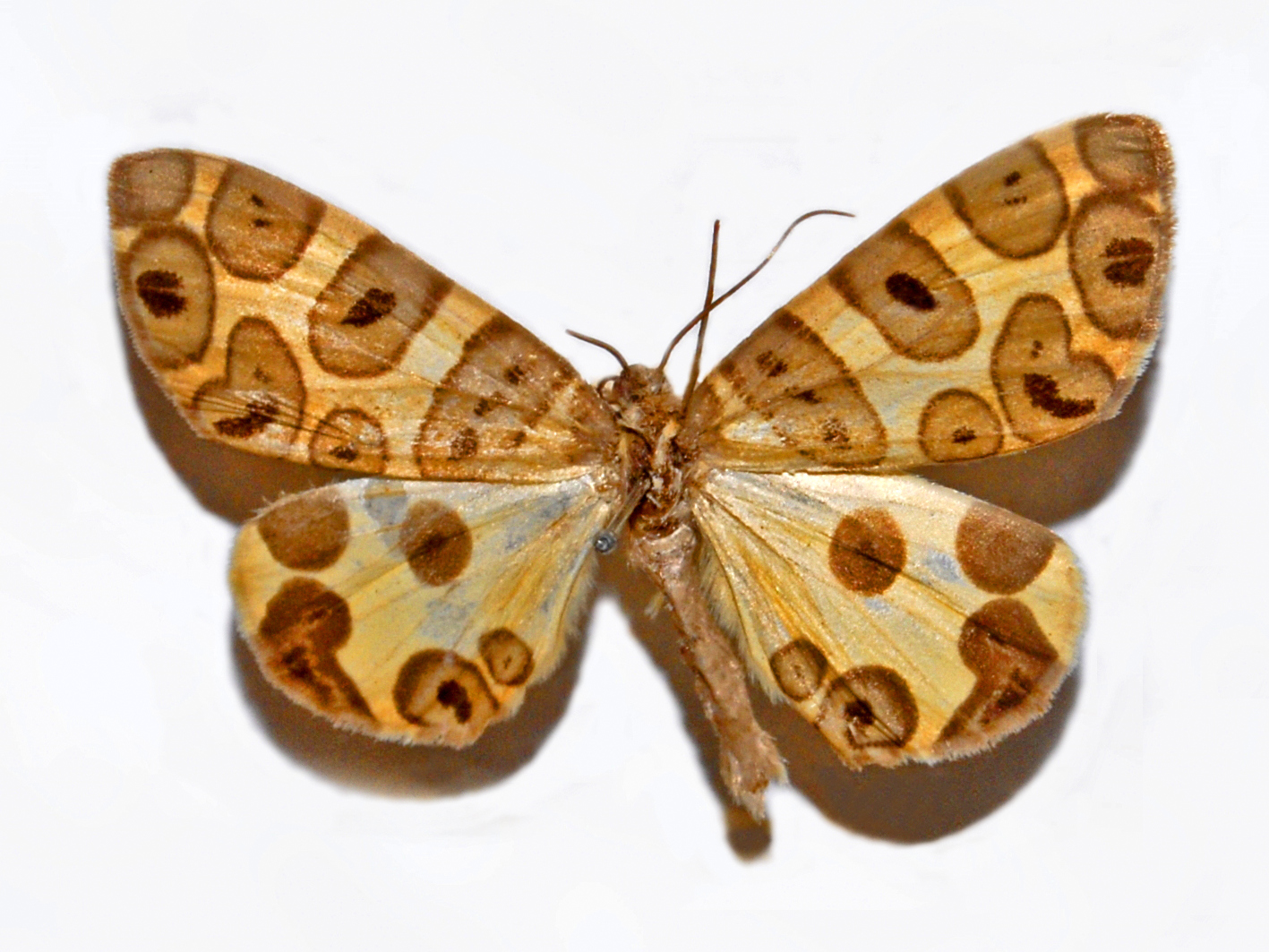

Pantherodes pardalaria is a species of moth in the family Geometridae first described by Jacob Hübner in 1823.

== Description ==
The wingspan of Pantherodes pardalaria can reach about 50 millimetres (2.0 in). These moths have yellow wings with leopard-like blue-grey blotches.

== Distribution ==
This species can be found in Mexico, Argentina, Brazil, Colombia, Ecuador,Uruguay and Paraguay.
