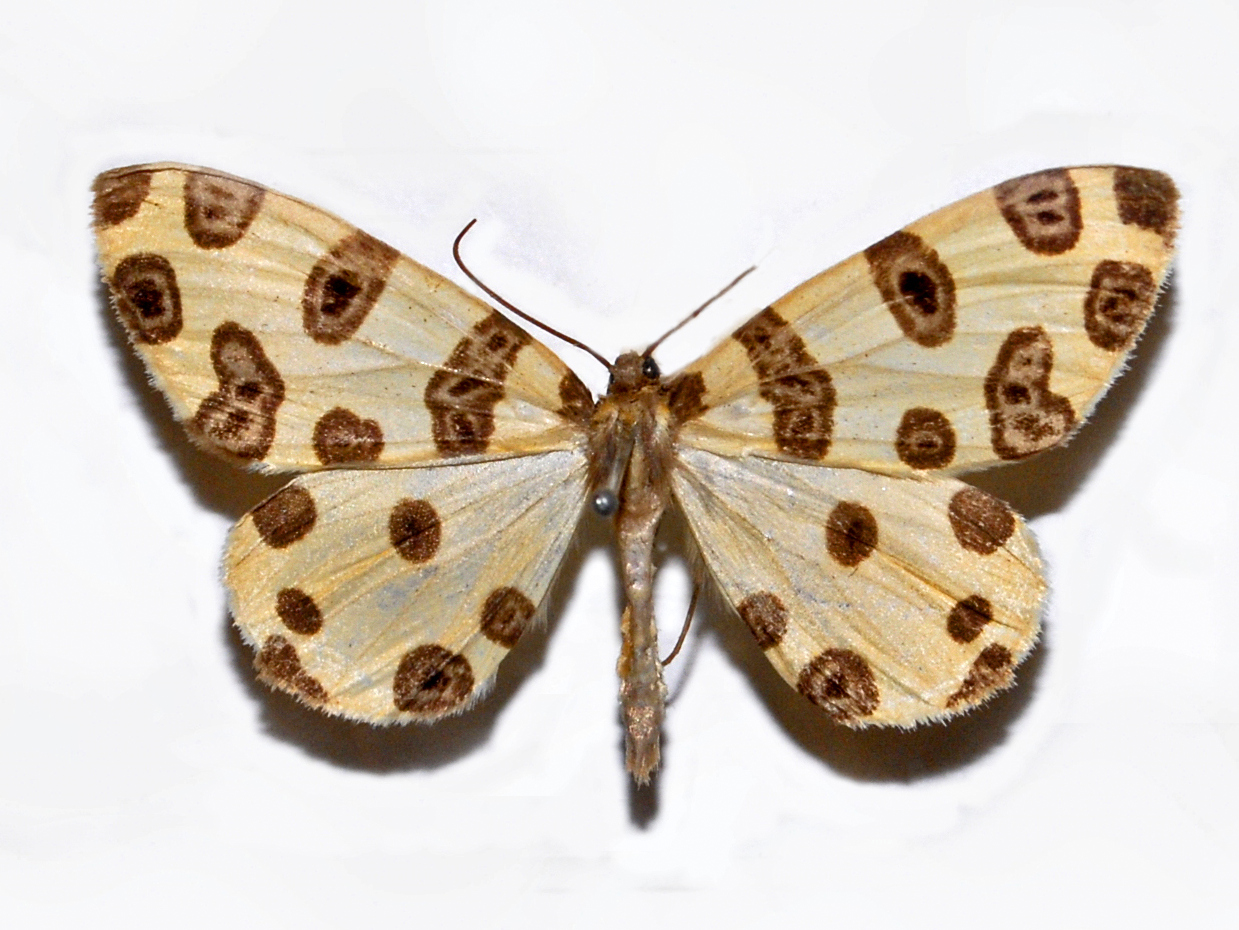
- Pantherodes colubraria. Mounted specimen

Scientific classification
- Kingdom: Animalia
- Phylum: Arthropoda
- Clade: Pancrustacea
- Class: Insecta
- Order: Lepidoptera
- Family: Geometridae
- Genus: Pantherodes
- Species: P. colubraria

Binomial name
- Pantherodes colubraria Guenée, 1858

Synonyms
- Panthera viperaria Thierry-Mieg, 1916; Panthera pumaria Schaus, 1901

= Pantherodes colubraria =

Species of moth

Pantherodes colubraria, common name blotched leopard, is a species of moth in the family Geometridae.

== Description ==
Wingspan of Pantherodes colubraria can reach about 50–55 millimetres (2.0–2.2 in). These moths have translucent yellow wings with leopard-like blotches.

== Distribution ==
This species can be found in Colombia, Ecuador and Peru.

== Subspecies ==
- Pantherodes colubraria colubraria
- Pantherodes colubraria viperaria (Thierry-Mieg, 1916)
