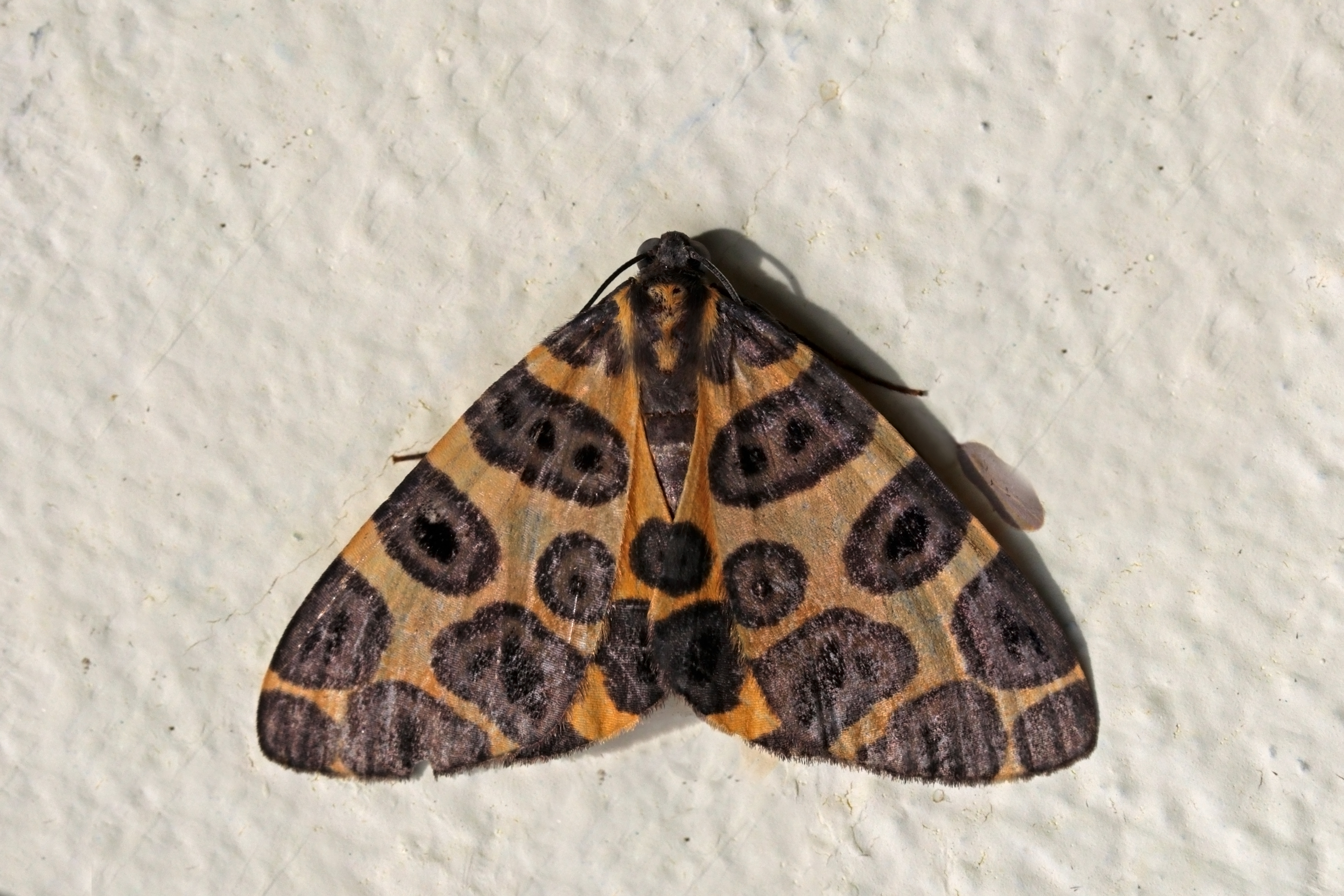
- Blotched leopard moth Pantherodes conglomerata Mount Totumas cloud forest, Panama

Scientific classification
- Kingdom: Animalia
- Phylum: Arthropoda
- Class: Insecta
- Order: Lepidoptera
- Family: Geometridae
- Genus: Pantherodes; Guenée, 1858

Synonyms
- Panthera Hübner, 1823

= Pantherodes =

Genus of moths

Pantherodes is a genus of moth in the family Geometridae.

== Species ==
- Pantherodes arizonensis
- Pantherodes colubraria
- Pantherodes conglomerata
- Pantherodes cornifrons
- Pantherodes crassa
- Pantherodes hoplitaria
- Pantherodes leonaria
- Pantherodes obliterata
- Pantherodes olivacea
- Pantherodes pardalaria
- Pantherodes perspicillum
- Pantherodes pumaria
- Pantherodes rhadinaria
- Pantherodes semiconfluens
- Pantherodes unciaria
- Pantherodes viperaria

== Description ==
Moths belonging to this genus have translucent yellow wings with leopard-like blotches.

== Distribution ==
These species can be found the southern states of the United States to Mexico, Costa Rica, Ecuador Bolivia, Venezuela, Peru, Brazil, Paraguay and Argentina.
