= Ecregma =

Ecregma may refer to two different genera of organisms:

- Ecregma Walker, 1858, a taxonomic synonym for Hemiceras, a genus of moths
- Ecregma Walker, 1859, a taxonomic synonym for Glympis, a genus of moths
