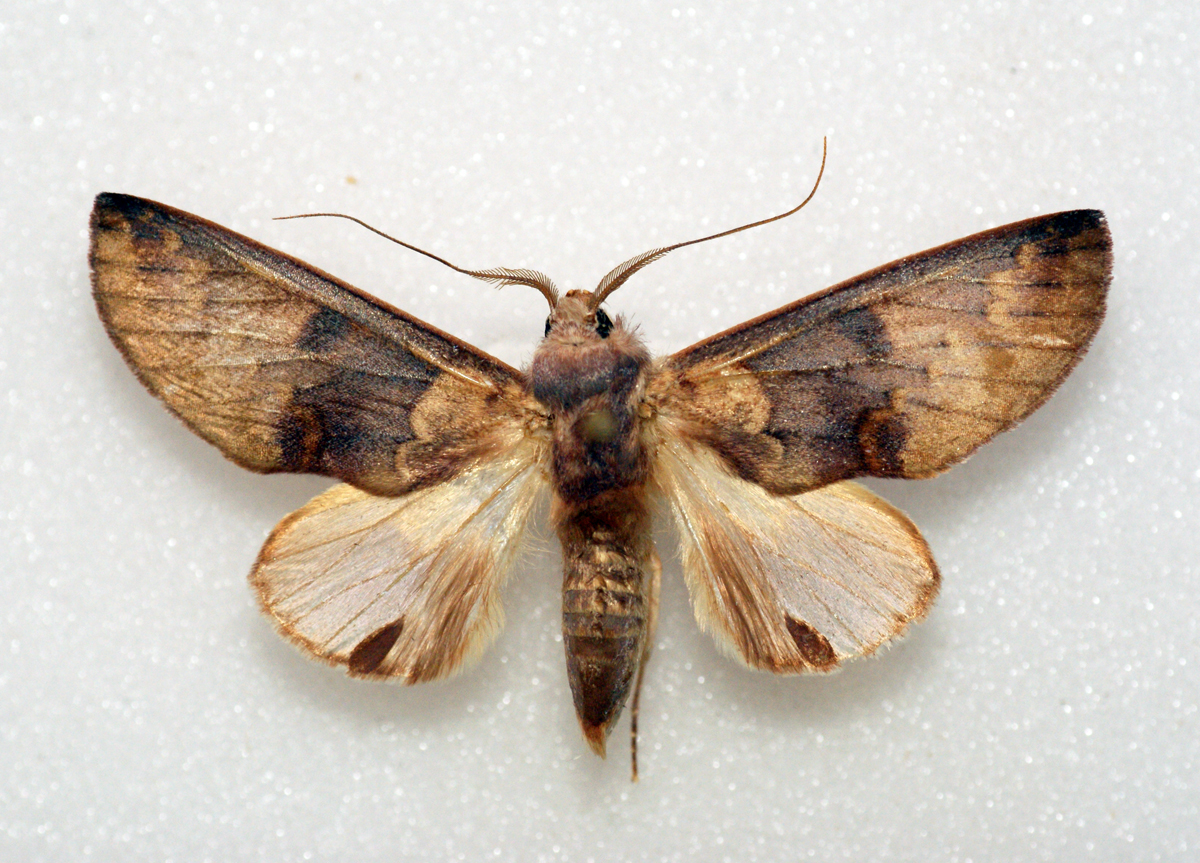
- Hemiceras meona

Scientific classification
- Kingdom: Animalia
- Phylum: Arthropoda
- Class: Insecta
- Order: Lepidoptera
- Superfamily: Noctuoidea
- Family: Notodontidae
- Subfamily: Hemiceratinae
- Genus: Hemiceras; Guenée, 1852

Synonyms
- List: Comidava Walker, 1863; Ecregma Walker, 1858; Epicoria Walker, 1865; Eulophopteryx Möschler, 1878; Gadiana Walker, 1865; Salamboria Walker, 1865

= Hemiceras =

Genus of moths

Hemiceras is a genus of moths of the family Notodontidae erected by Achille Guenée in 1852.

== Species ==
The following species are recognised in the genus Hemiceras:

- Hemiceras aena Dognin, 1911
- Hemiceras affinis Druce, 1905
- Hemiceras alba Walker, 1865
- Hemiceras albisignata Bryk, 1953
- Hemiceras albulana Druce, 1887
- Hemiceras amanda Schaus, 1911
- Hemiceras angulinea Schaus, 1904
- Hemiceras arbogasta Schaus, 1928
- Hemiceras aroensis Schaus, 1901
- Hemiceras avangareza Schaus, 1912
- Hemiceras barina Guenée, 1852
- Hemiceras beata Schaus, 1906
- Hemiceras benica Schaus, 1937
- Hemiceras bilinea Schaus, 1901
- Hemiceras brunnea Schaus, 1901
- Hemiceras bucklei Druce, 1905
- Hemiceras buscki Dyar, 1908
- Hemiceras cabnala Schaus, 1933
- Hemiceras cadmia Guenée, 1852
- Hemiceras cadmioides Dognin, 1923
- Hemiceras calaonis Dyar, 1908
- Hemiceras casiaclara Dognin, 1924
- Hemiceras castanea Dognin, 1914
- Hemiceras castaneoides Draudt, 1933
- Hemiceras cayaba Schaus, 1937
- Hemiceras cayennensis Schaus, 1906
- Hemiceras ceiba Schaus, 1911
- Hemiceras celia Schaus, 1911
- Hemiceras chabila Schaus, 1937
- Hemiceras chavin Thiaucourt, 1982
- Hemiceras chromona Schaus, 1928
- Hemiceras cinescens Draudt, 1933
- Hemiceras cinnoma Draudt, 1933
- Hemiceras clarki Schaus, 1911
- Hemiceras climaca Schaus, 1928
- Hemiceras coatina Schaus, 1921
- Hemiceras colombia Dyar, 1908
- Hemiceras colorata Dognin, 1923
- Hemiceras commentica Schaus, 1906
- Hemiceras congrua Dognin, 1923
- Hemiceras consobrina Dognin, 1911
- Hemiceras conspirata Schaus, 1906
- Hemiceras constellata Dognin, 1904
- Hemiceras constelletoides Thiaucourt, 1998
- Hemiceras corema Schaus, 1911
- Hemiceras cotto Dyar, 1908
- Hemiceras crassa Schaus, 1906
- Hemiceras daguana Draudt, 1933
- Hemiceras daguensis Dognin, 1911
- Hemiceras dentata Dognin, 1914
- Hemiceras deornata Walker, 1865
- Hemiceras domingonis Dyar, 1908
- Hemiceras draudti Thiaucourt, 1991
- Hemiceras dyari Strand, 1911
- Hemiceras echo Dyar, 1908
- Hemiceras egregia Dognin, 1901
- Hemiceras elphega Schaus, 1928
- Hemiceras emerillonarum Thiaucourt, 1987
- Hemiceras eustalhia Schaus, 1928
- Hemiceras evanescens Dyar, 1908
- Hemiceras fabiennae Thiaucourt, 1978
- Hemiceras flava Schaus, 1906
- Hemiceras flavescens Schaus, 1906
- Hemiceras flavorufa Dognin, 1923
- Hemiceras francina Schaus, 1939
- Hemiceras gemina Walker, 1865
- Hemiceras geraesa Schaus, 1937
- Hemiceras gigas Draudt, 1933
- Hemiceras gortynoides Schaus, 1906
- Hemiceras guera Schaus, 1937
- Hemiceras hidulpha Schaus, 1928
- Hemiceras imitans Draudt, 1933
- Hemiceras indigna Schaus, 1906
- Hemiceras indistans Guenée, 1852
- Hemiceras jacksoni Kaye, 1924
- Hemiceras jejuna Schaus, 1906
- Hemiceras joinvillia Schaus, 1928
- Hemiceras jophona Schaus, 1939
- Hemiceras jovita Schaus, 1928
- Hemiceras kartabena Schaus, 1939
- Hemiceras kearfotti Dyar, 1908
- Hemiceras latior Draudt, 1933
- Hemiceras laurentina Schaus, 1906
- Hemiceras leucospila Walker, 1857
- Hemiceras levana Druce, 1890
- Hemiceras liboria Schaus, 1928
- Hemiceras lilacina Dognin, 1911
- Hemiceras linea Guenée, 1852
- Hemiceras lissa Druce, 1890
- Hemiceras lissana Thiaucourt, 1994
- Hemiceras lissanella Thiaucourt, 1994
- Hemiceras lissaura Thiaucourt, 1994
- Hemiceras lissaurella Thiaucourt, 1995
- Hemiceras longipennis Schaus, 1905
- Hemiceras losa Druce, 1890
- Hemiceras lotula Guenée, 1852
- Hemiceras manora Schaus, 1906
- Hemiceras maronita Schaus, 1906
- Hemiceras meona Cramer, 1797
- Hemiceras metallescens Schaus, 1906
- Hemiceras metastigma Walker, 1857
- Hemiceras mezata Schaus, 1939
- Hemiceras micans Schaus, 1906
- Hemiceras modesta Butler, 1879
- Hemiceras monegonda Schaus, 1928
- Hemiceras moresca Schaus, 1904
- Hemiceras muscosa Schaus, 1906
- Hemiceras mutoca Draudt, 1933
- Hemiceras nebulosa Schaus, 1906
- Hemiceras nigrescens Schaus, 1901
- Hemiceras nigricosta Schaus, 1901
- Hemiceras nigrigutta Schaus, 1901
- Hemiceras nigriplaga Schaus, 1906
- Hemiceras noctifer Schaus, 1928
- Hemiceras nubilata Schaus, 1901
- Hemiceras nupera Dognin, 1923
- Hemiceras obliquicola Walker, 1862
- Hemiceras ochrospila Dyar, 1908
- Hemiceras oleagina Dognin, 1908
- Hemiceras oleaginea Dognin, 1908
- Hemiceras olivenca Draudt, 1933
- Hemiceras ovalis Schaus, 1901
- Hemiceras pagana Schaus, 1901
- Hemiceras pallidula Guenée, 1852
- Hemiceras perbrunnea Dognin, 1923
- Hemiceras pernubila Dyar, 1908
- Hemiceras phocas Schaus, 1928
- Hemiceras piccolata Dognin, 1911
- Hemiceras plana Butler, 1879
- Hemiceras plusiata Felder, 1874
- Hemiceras pohli Schaus, 1921
- Hemiceras postica Maassen, 1890
- Hemiceras poulsoni Schaus, 1906
- Hemiceras praxides Schaus, 1928
- Hemiceras princeps Draudt, 1933
- Hemiceras proarufa Thiaucourt, 2015
- Hemiceras proximata Dognin, 1924
- Hemiceras pulverula Guenée, 1852
- Hemiceras punctata Dognin, 1889
- Hemiceras punctilla Schaus, 1901
- Hemiceras pusilla Thiaucourt, 1994
- Hemiceras quebra Schaus, 1901
- Hemiceras rava Schaus, 1911
- Hemiceras ravula Dognin, 1914
- Hemiceras refuga Dognin, 1910
- Hemiceras reyburni Schaus, 1928
- Hemiceras romani Bryk, 1953
- Hemiceras rosteria Schaus, 1939
- Hemiceras rufescens Walker, 1965
- Hemiceras rufula Dognin, 1923
- Hemiceras ruizi Dognin, 1889
- Hemiceras sabis Guenée, 1852
- Hemiceras saron Dognin, 1908
- Hemiceras satelles Schaus, 1906
- Hemiceras saulensis Thiaucourt, 2015
- Hemiceras scalata Dognin, 1914
- Hemiceras securifera Thiaucourt, 2015
- Hemiceras semililacea Dognin, 1923
- Hemiceras serana Schaus, 1901
- Hemiceras sericilinea Schaus, 1921
- Hemiceras sericita Schaus, 1901
- Hemiceras serrata Draudt, 1933
- Hemiceras siderea Schaus, 1911
- Hemiceras sigula
- Hemiceras singula Guenée, 1852
- Hemiceras soso Dyar, 1908
- Hemiceras sparsipennis Walker, 1857
- Hemiceras stigmata Bryk, 1953
- Hemiceras stigmatica Dognin, 1921
- Hemiceras striata Schaus, 1901
- Hemiceras striolata Butler, 1879
- Hemiceras stupida Schaus, 1905
- Hemiceras subdigna Dyar, 1908
- Hemiceras subo
- Hemiceras subochraceum Walker, 1866
- Hemiceras tabona Schaus, 1939
- Hemiceras taperinha Schaus, 1928
- Hemiceras teffea Schaus, 1928
- Hemiceras testudinaris Thiaucourt, 2015
- Hemiceras timea Schaus, 1939
- Hemiceras toddi Thiaucourt, 2008
- Hemiceras torva Schaus, 1911
- Hemiceras transducta Walker, 1857
- Hemiceras trapezina Draudt, 1933
- Hemiceras tricolora Dyar, 1908
- Hemiceras trinubila Guenée, 1852
- Hemiceras triopas Dognin, 1908
- Hemiceras tristana Schaus, 1939
- Hemiceras truncata Schaus, 1904
- Hemiceras tulola Schaus, 1901
- Hemiceras turiafa Schaus, 1928
- Hemiceras turnina Schaus, 1928
- Hemiceras undilinea Schaus, 1906
- Hemiceras unimacula Dyar, 1908
- Hemiceras ursara Schaus, 1928
- Hemiceras variegata Dognin, 1923
- Hemiceras vecina Schaus, 1901
- Hemiceras velva Schaus, 1901
- Hemiceras vinicosta Guenée, 1852
- Hemiceras vinvala Schaus, 1928
- Hemiceras violascens Guenée, 1852
- Hemiceras zula Schaus, 1911
- BOLD:AAA2786 (Hemiceras sp.)
- BOLD:AAA4135 (Hemiceras sp.)
- BOLD:AAA4232 (Hemiceras sp.)
- BOLD:AAA4842 (Hemiceras sp.)
- BOLD:AAA5091 (Hemiceras sp.)
- BOLD:AAA6651 (Hemiceras sp.)
- BOLD:AAA6657 (Hemiceras sp.)
- BOLD:AAA7082 (Hemiceras sp.)
- BOLD:AAA7591 (Hemiceras sp.)
- BOLD:AAA7592 (Hemiceras sp.)
- BOLD:AAA8494 (Hemiceras sp.)
- BOLD:AAA9563 (Hemiceras sp.)
- BOLD:AAB1139 (Hemiceras sp.)
- BOLD:AAB5178 (Hemiceras sp.)
- BOLD:AAB5793 (Hemiceras sp.)
- BOLD:AAB7687 (Hemiceras sp.)
- BOLD:AAB8073 (Hemiceras sp.)
- BOLD:AAC0505 (Hemiceras sp.)
- BOLD:AAC0523 (Hemiceras sp.)
- BOLD:AAC2200 (Hemiceras sp.)
- BOLD:AAC8589 (Hemiceras sp.)
- BOLD:AAD0206 (Hemiceras sp.)
- BOLD:AAI6819 (Hemiceras sp.)
- BOLD:AAK4807 (Hemiceras sp.)
- BOLD:AAK4808 (Hemiceras sp.)
- BOLD:AAK4818 (Hemiceras sp.)
- BOLD:AAL5581 (Hemiceras sp.)
- BOLD:AAL6548 (Hemiceras sp.)
- BOLD:AAL6549 (Hemiceras sp.)
- BOLD:AAM8336 (Hemiceras sp.)
- BOLD:AAM8386 (Hemiceras sp.)
- BOLD:AAM8415 (Hemiceras sp.)
- BOLD:AAN6799 (Hemiceras sp.)
- BOLD:AAT9151 (Hemiceras sp.)
- BOLD:AAT9152 (Hemiceras sp.)
- BOLD:AAT9153 (Hemiceras sp.)
- BOLD:AAT9154 (Hemiceras sp.)
- BOLD:AAT9156 (Hemiceras sp.)
- BOLD:AAU5218 (Hemiceras sp.)
- BOLD:AAU5813 (Hemiceras sp.)
- BOLD:AAX1377 (Hemiceras sp.)
- BOLD:ABZ6773 (Hemiceras sp.)
- BOLD:ACE9746 (Hemiceras sp.)
- BOLD:ACG8958 (Hemiceras sp.)
- BOLD:ACL2917 (Hemiceras sp.)
- BOLD:ACL3058 (Hemiceras sp.)
- BOLD:ACL3398 (Hemiceras sp.)
- BOLD:ACL3829 (Hemiceras sp.)
- BOLD:ACL4314 (Hemiceras sp.)
- BOLD:ACL4336 (Hemiceras sp.)
- BOLD:ACL4418 (Hemiceras sp.)
- BOLD:ACL4446 (Hemiceras sp.)
- BOLD:ACL4491 (Hemiceras sp.)
- BOLD:ACL4875 (Hemiceras sp.)
- BOLD:ACL4920 (Hemiceras sp.)
- BOLD:ACL4921 (Hemiceras sp.)
- BOLD:ACL4953 (Hemiceras sp.)
- BOLD:ACL4961 (Hemiceras sp.)
- BOLD:ACL5066 (Hemiceras sp.)
- BOLD:ACL5148 (Hemiceras sp.)
- BOLD:ACL5619 (Hemiceras sp.)
- BOLD:ACL5914 (Hemiceras sp.)
- BOLD:AEC3308 (Hemiceras sp.)
