= Euthyone melanocera =

Scientific classification
- Kingdom: Animalia
- Phylum: Arthropoda
- Clade: Pancrustacea
- Class: Insecta
- Order: Lepidoptera
- Superfamily: Noctuoidea
- Family: Erebidae
- Subfamily: Arctiinae
- Genus: Euthyone
- Species: E. melanocera

Binomial name
- Euthyone melanocera (Schaus, 1899)

Synonyms
- Thyone melanocera Schaus, 1899

Species of moth

Euthyone melanocera is a species of moth in the subfamily Arctiinae that was first described by William Schaus in 1899. It is found in Trinidad, Venezuela and Suriname.
