= Euthyone parima =

Scientific classification
- Domain: Eukaryota
- Kingdom: Animalia
- Phylum: Arthropoda
- Class: Insecta
- Order: Lepidoptera
- Superfamily: Noctuoidea
- Family: Erebidae
- Subfamily: Arctiinae
- Genus: Euthyone
- Species: E. parima

Binomial name
- Euthyone parima (Schaus, 1896)

Synonyms
- Trichomelia parima Schaus, 1896

Species of moth

Euthyone parima is a moth of the subfamily Arctiinae first described by Schaus in 1896. It is found in the Brazilian state of São Paulo.
