= Euthyone trimaculata =

Scientific classification
- Domain: Eukaryota
- Kingdom: Animalia
- Phylum: Arthropoda
- Class: Insecta
- Order: Lepidoptera
- Superfamily: Noctuoidea
- Family: Erebidae
- Subfamily: Arctiinae
- Genus: Euthyone
- Species: E. trimaculata

Binomial name
- Euthyone trimaculata (E. D. Jones, 1908)

Synonyms
- Thyone trimaculata E. D. Jones, 1908

Species of moth

Euthyone trimaculata is a moth of the subfamily Arctiinae first described by E. Dukinfield Jones in 1908. It is found in Brazil.
