= Euthyone theodula =

Scientific classification
- Domain: Eukaryota
- Kingdom: Animalia
- Phylum: Arthropoda
- Class: Insecta
- Order: Lepidoptera
- Superfamily: Noctuoidea
- Family: Erebidae
- Subfamily: Arctiinae
- Genus: Euthyone
- Species: E. theodula

Binomial name
- Euthyone theodula (Schaus, 1924)

Synonyms
- Thyone theodula Schaus, 1924

Species of moth

Euthyone theodula is a moth of the subfamily Arctiinae. It is found in Guatemala and Honduras.
