= Euthyone celenna =

Scientific classification
- Domain: Eukaryota
- Kingdom: Animalia
- Phylum: Arthropoda
- Class: Insecta
- Order: Lepidoptera
- Superfamily: Noctuoidea
- Family: Erebidae
- Subfamily: Arctiinae
- Genus: Euthyone
- Species: E. celenna

Binomial name
- Euthyone celenna (Schaus, 1892)

Synonyms
- Trichomelia celenna Schaus, 1892

Species of moth

Euthyone celenna is a moth of the subfamily Arctiinae first described by Schaus in 1892. It is found in the Brazilian states of São Paulo, Paraná and Rio de Janeiro.
