= Euthyone simplex =

Scientific classification
- Kingdom: Animalia
- Phylum: Arthropoda
- Class: Insecta
- Order: Lepidoptera
- Superfamily: Noctuoidea
- Family: Erebidae
- Subfamily: Arctiinae
- Genus: Euthyone
- Species: E. simplex

Binomial name
- Euthyone simplex (Walker, 1854)

Synonyms
- Thyone simplex Walker, 1854; Lithosia alba Druce, 1885; Crambidia parvita Schaus, 1896

Species of moth

Euthyone simplex is a moth of the subfamily Arctiinae first described by Francis Walker in 1854. It is found in Mexico, Honduras, Panama and São Paulo, Brazil.
