= Euthyone tincta =

Scientific classification
- Kingdom: Animalia
- Phylum: Arthropoda
- Class: Insecta
- Order: Lepidoptera
- Superfamily: Noctuoidea
- Family: Erebidae
- Subfamily: Arctiinae
- Genus: Euthyone
- Species: E. tincta

Binomial name
- Euthyone tincta (Hampson, 1900)

Synonyms
- Thyoone tincta Hampson, 1900

Species of moth

Euthyone tincta is a moth of the subfamily Arctiinae first described by George Hampson in 1900. It is found in Bolivia.
