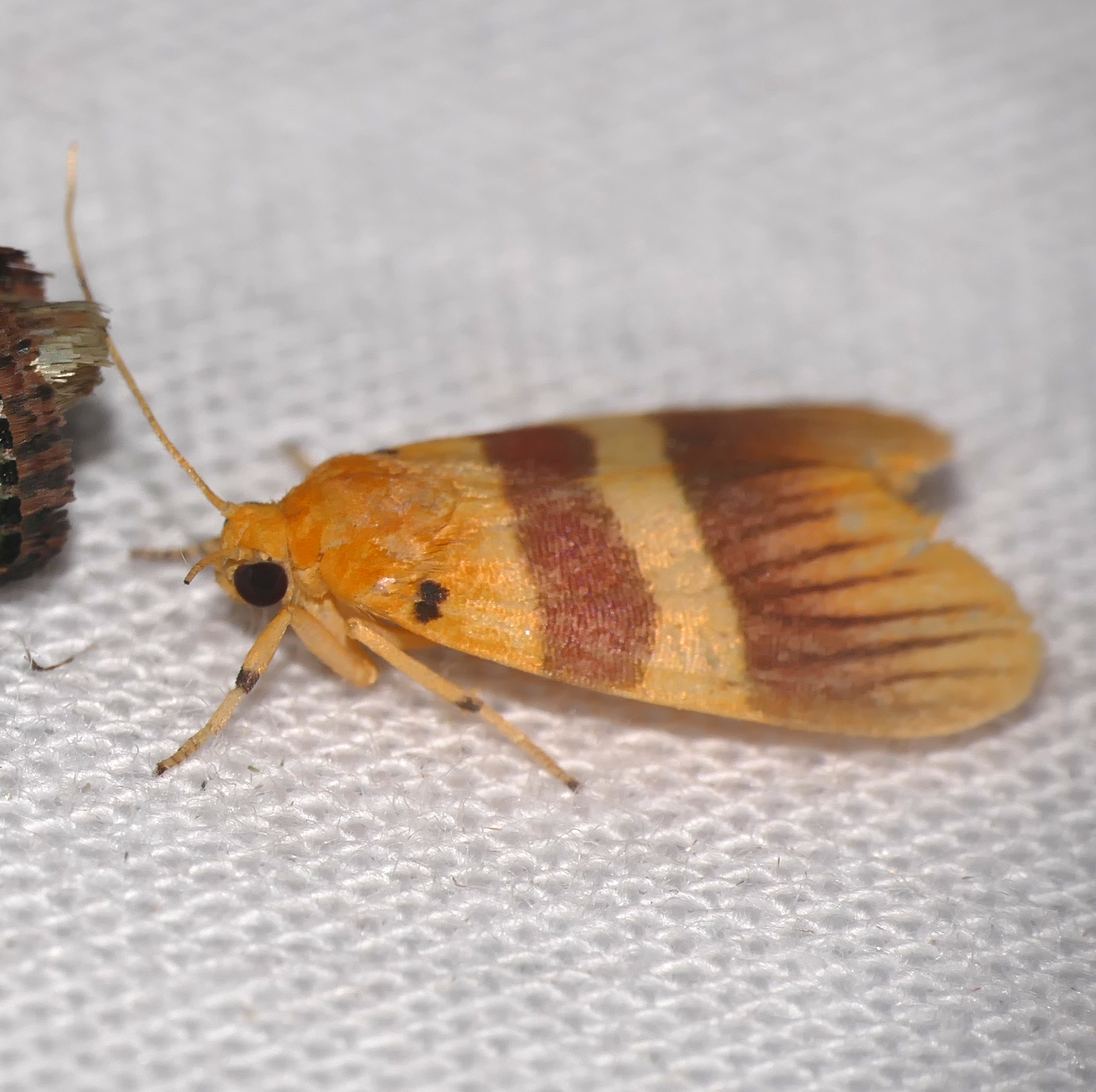

Scientific classification
- Kingdom: Animalia
- Phylum: Arthropoda
- Class: Insecta
- Order: Lepidoptera
- Superfamily: Noctuoidea
- Family: Erebidae
- Subfamily: Arctiinae
- Genus: Euthyone
- Species: E. dremma

Binomial name
- Euthyone dremma (Dyar, 1910)

Synonyms
- Thyonaea dremma Dyar, 1910

= Euthyone dremma =

Species of moth

Euthyone dremma is a moth of the subfamily Arctiinae. It is found in Guyana.
