= Euthyone placida =

Scientific classification
- Domain: Eukaryota
- Kingdom: Animalia
- Phylum: Arthropoda
- Class: Insecta
- Order: Lepidoptera
- Superfamily: Noctuoidea
- Family: Erebidae
- Subfamily: Arctiinae
- Genus: Euthyone
- Species: E. placida

Binomial name
- Euthyone placida (Schaus, 1896)

Synonyms
- Trichomelia placida Schaus, 1896

Species of moth

Euthyone placida is a moth of the subfamily Arctiinae first described by Schaus in 1896. It is found in São Paulo, Brazil.
