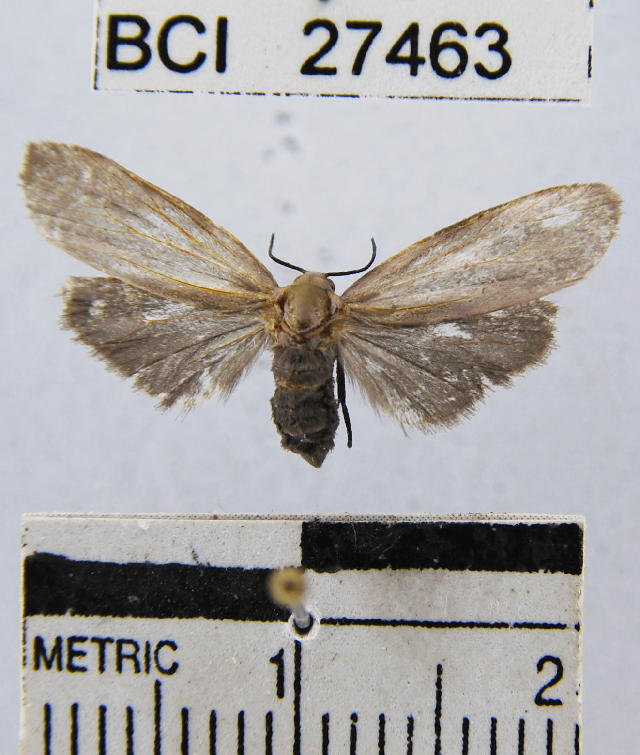
- Euthyone grisescens

Scientific classification
- Domain: Eukaryota
- Kingdom: Animalia
- Phylum: Arthropoda
- Class: Insecta
- Order: Lepidoptera
- Superfamily: Noctuoidea
- Family: Erebidae
- Subfamily: Arctiinae
- Tribe: Lithosiini
- Genus: Euthyone; Watson, Fletcher & Nye, 1980

Synonyms
- Thyone Walker, 1854 (preocc.); Trichomelia Schaus, 1892

= Euthyone =

Genus of moths

Euthyone is a genus of moths in the subfamily Arctiinae. The genus was erected by Watson, Fletcher and Nye in 1980.

== Species ==
- Euthyone celenna
- Euthyone dremma
- Euthyone grisescens
- Euthyone melanocera
- Euthyone muricolor
- Euthyone parima
- Euthyone perbella
- Euthyone placida
- Euthyone purpurea
- Euthyone simplex
- Euthyone theodula
- Euthyone tincta
- Euthyone trimaculata
