= Euthyone purpurea =

Scientific classification
- Domain: Eukaryota
- Kingdom: Animalia
- Phylum: Arthropoda
- Class: Insecta
- Order: Lepidoptera
- Superfamily: Noctuoidea
- Family: Erebidae
- Subfamily: Arctiinae
- Genus: Euthyone
- Species: E. purpurea

Binomial name
- Euthyone purpurea (E. D. Jones, 1914)

Synonyms
- Thyone purpurea E. D. Jones, 1914

Species of moth

Euthyone purpurea is a moth of the subfamily Arctiinae first described by E. Dukinfield Jones in 1914. It is found in Brazil.
