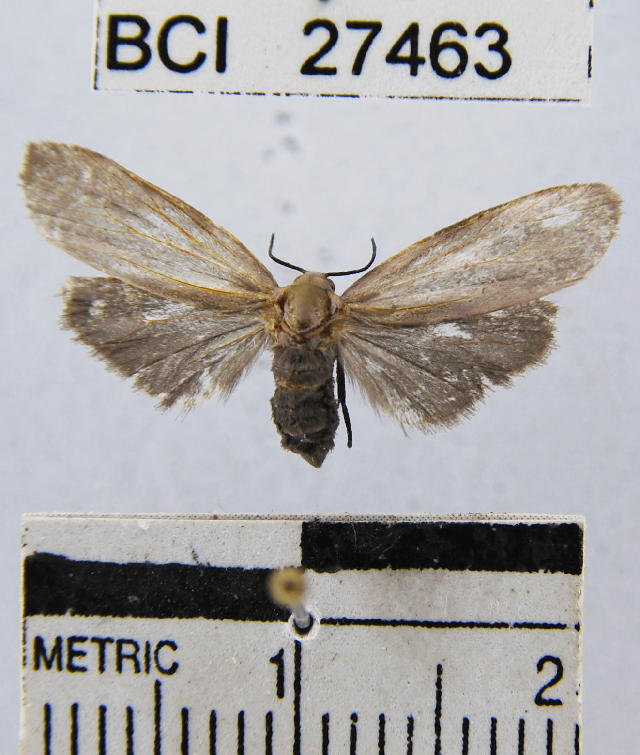

Scientific classification
- Domain: Eukaryota
- Kingdom: Animalia
- Phylum: Arthropoda
- Class: Insecta
- Order: Lepidoptera
- Superfamily: Noctuoidea
- Family: Erebidae
- Subfamily: Arctiinae
- Genus: Euthyone
- Species: E. grisescens

Binomial name
- Euthyone grisescens (Schaus, 1911)

Synonyms
- Thyone grisescens Schaus, 1911

= Euthyone grisescens =

Species of moth

Euthyone grisescens is a moth of the subfamily Arctiinae. It is found in Costa Rica.
