= Euthyone perbella =

Scientific classification
- Domain: Eukaryota
- Kingdom: Animalia
- Phylum: Arthropoda
- Class: Insecta
- Order: Lepidoptera
- Superfamily: Noctuoidea
- Family: Erebidae
- Subfamily: Arctiinae
- Genus: Euthyone
- Species: E. perbella

Binomial name
- Euthyone perbella (Schaus, 1905)

Synonyms
- Thyone perbella Schaus, 1905

Species of moth

Euthyone perbella is a moth of the subfamily Arctiinae. It is found in French Guiana.
