= Cercopimorpha =

Scientific classification
- Domain: Eukaryota
- Kingdom: Animalia
- Phylum: Arthropoda
- Class: Insecta
- Order: Lepidoptera
- Superfamily: Noctuoidea
- Family: Erebidae
- Subfamily: Arctiinae
- Genus: Cercopimorpha; Butler, 1876

Genus of moths

Cercopimorpha is a genus of moths in the subfamily Arctiinae. The genus was described by Arthur Gardiner Butler in 1876.

== Species ==
- Cercopimorpha dolens (Schaus, 1905)
- Cercopimorpha hoffmanni Zerny, 1931
- Cercopimorpha homopteridia Butler, 1876
- Cercopimorpha meterythra Hampson, 1898
- Cercopimorpha postflavida (Rothschild, 1912)
- Cercopimorpha sylva Schaus, 1920
- Cercopimorpha tetragonia Hampson, 1898

== Selected former species ==
- Cercopimorpha complexa Gaede, 1926
