= Delphyre =

Scientific classification
- Kingdom: Animalia
- Phylum: Arthropoda
- Class: Insecta
- Order: Lepidoptera
- Superfamily: Noctuoidea
- Family: Erebidae
- Subfamily: Arctiinae
- Subtribe: Euchromiina
- Genus: Delphyre; Walker, 1854

Genus of moths

Delphyre is a genus of moths in the subfamily Arctiinae. The genus was erected by Francis Walker in 1854.

== Species ==
- Delphyre cumulosa Dyar, 1914
- Delphyre elachia Dyar, 1914
- Delphyre hebes Walker, 1854
- Delphyre tetilla (Dognin, 1898)

== Former species ==
- Delphyre testacea (Druce, 1884)
