= Cercopimorpha hoffmanni =

Scientific classification
- Domain: Eukaryota
- Kingdom: Animalia
- Phylum: Arthropoda
- Class: Insecta
- Order: Lepidoptera
- Superfamily: Noctuoidea
- Family: Erebidae
- Subfamily: Arctiinae
- Genus: Cercopimorpha
- Species: C. hoffmanni

Binomial name
- Cercopimorpha hoffmanni Zerny, 1931

Species of moth

Cercopimorpha hoffmanni is a moth of the subfamily Arctiinae. It was described by Zerny in 1931. It is found in Brazil.
