= Neacerea albiventus =

Scientific classification
- Kingdom: Animalia
- Phylum: Arthropoda
- Clade: Pancrustacea
- Class: Insecta
- Order: Lepidoptera
- Superfamily: Noctuoidea
- Family: Erebidae
- Subfamily: Arctiinae
- Genus: Neacerea
- Species: N. albiventus

Binomial name
- Neacerea albiventus H. Druce, 1898

Species of moth

Neacerea albiventus is a moth in the subfamily Arctiinae. It was described by Herbert Druce in 1898. It is found in Minas Gerais, Brazil.
