= Neacerea pusilla =

Scientific classification
- Kingdom: Animalia
- Phylum: Arthropoda
- Clade: Pancrustacea
- Class: Insecta
- Order: Lepidoptera
- Superfamily: Noctuoidea
- Family: Erebidae
- Subfamily: Arctiinae
- Genus: Neacerea
- Species: N. pusilla

Binomial name
- Neacerea pusilla (Butler, 1878)

Synonyms
- Acridopsis pusilla Butler, 1878; Sphinx dares Cramer, [1775]

Species of moth

Neacerea pusilla is a moth in the subfamily Arctiinae. It was described by Arthur Gardiner Butler in 1878. It is found in the Amazon region.
