= Neacerea dizona =

Scientific classification
- Kingdom: Animalia
- Phylum: Arthropoda
- Clade: Pancrustacea
- Class: Insecta
- Order: Lepidoptera
- Superfamily: Noctuoidea
- Family: Erebidae
- Subfamily: Arctiinae
- Genus: Neacerea
- Species: N. dizona

Binomial name
- Neacerea dizona H. Druce, 1898

Species of moth

Neacerea dizona is a moth in the subfamily Arctiinae. It was described by Herbert Druce in 1898. It is found in French Guiana.
