= Cercopimorpha sylva =

Scientific classification
- Domain: Eukaryota
- Kingdom: Animalia
- Phylum: Arthropoda
- Class: Insecta
- Order: Lepidoptera
- Superfamily: Noctuoidea
- Family: Erebidae
- Subfamily: Arctiinae
- Genus: Cercopimorpha
- Species: C. sylva

Binomial name
- Cercopimorpha sylva Schaus, 1920

Species of moth

Cercopimorpha sylva is a moth of the subfamily Arctiinae. It was described by William Schaus in 1920. It is found in Costa Rica and Guatemala.

The wingspan is about 28 mm. The forewings are dark slate, tinged with lilacine and with dark brown veins. The hindwings are fuscous, somewhat semihyaline through and beyond the cell. Adults have been recorded in forests during the day.
