= Neacerea brunnea =

Scientific classification
- Kingdom: Animalia
- Phylum: Arthropoda
- Clade: Pancrustacea
- Class: Insecta
- Order: Lepidoptera
- Superfamily: Noctuoidea
- Family: Erebidae
- Subfamily: Arctiinae
- Genus: Neacerea
- Species: N. brunnea

Binomial name
- Neacerea brunnea H. Druce, 1898

Species of moth

Neacerea brunnea is a moth in the subfamily Arctiinae. It was described by Herbert Druce in 1898. It is found in Espírito Santo, Brazil.
