= Neacerea maculosa =

Scientific classification
- Kingdom: Animalia
- Phylum: Arthropoda
- Clade: Pancrustacea
- Class: Insecta
- Order: Lepidoptera
- Superfamily: Noctuoidea
- Family: Erebidae
- Subfamily: Arctiinae
- Genus: Neacerea
- Species: N. maculosa

Binomial name
- Neacerea maculosa Hampson, 1898

Synonyms
- Delphyre maculosa (Hampson, 1898)

Species of moth

Neacerea maculosa is a moth in the subfamily Arctiinae. It was described by George Hampson in 1898. It is found in Pará, Brazil.
