= Neacerea minutum =

Scientific classification
- Kingdom: Animalia
- Phylum: Arthropoda
- Class: Insecta
- Order: Lepidoptera
- Superfamily: Noctuoidea
- Family: Erebidae
- Subfamily: Arctiinae
- Genus: Neacerea
- Species: N. minutum

Binomial name
- Neacerea minutum (Möschler, 1878)

Synonyms
- Eucereon minutum Möschler, 1878 (preocc. H. Druce, 1884); Neacerea minuta

Species of moth

Neacerea minutum is a moth in the subfamily Arctiinae. It was described by Heinrich Benno Möschler in 1878. It is found in Venezuela, Suriname and Bolivia.
