= Neacerea atava =

Scientific classification
- Kingdom: Animalia
- Phylum: Arthropoda
- Clade: Pancrustacea
- Class: Insecta
- Order: Lepidoptera
- Superfamily: Noctuoidea
- Family: Erebidae
- Subfamily: Arctiinae
- Genus: Neacerea
- Species: N. atava

Binomial name
- Neacerea atava (H. Druce, 1884)

Synonyms
- Heliura atava H. Druce, 1884

Species of moth

Neacerea atava is a moth in the subfamily Arctiinae. It was described by Herbert Druce in 1884. It is found in Panama.
