= Cercopimorpha tetragonia =

Scientific classification
- Kingdom: Animalia
- Phylum: Arthropoda
- Clade: Pancrustacea
- Class: Insecta
- Order: Lepidoptera
- Superfamily: Noctuoidea
- Family: Erebidae
- Subfamily: Arctiinae
- Genus: Cercopimorpha
- Species: C. tetragonia

Binomial name
- Cercopimorpha tetragonia Hampson, 1898

Species of moth

Cercopimorpha tetragonia is a moth of the subfamily Arctiinae. It was described by George Hampson in 1898. It is found in Venezuela.
