= Neacerea =

Scientific classification
- Kingdom: Animalia
- Phylum: Arthropoda
- Class: Insecta
- Order: Lepidoptera
- Superfamily: Noctuoidea
- Family: Erebidae
- Subfamily: Arctiinae
- Genus: Neacerea; Druce, 1898

Genus of moths

Neacerea is a genus of moths in the subfamily Arctiinae.

== Species ==
- Neacerea atava (Druce, 1884)
- Neacerea albiventus Druce, 1898
- Neacerea brunnea Druce, 1898
- Neacerea dizona Druce, 1898
- Neacerea maculosa Hampson, 1898
- Neacerea minutum (Möschler, 1878)
- Neacerea pusilla (Butler, 1878)
- Neacerea rubricincta Hampson, 1898
- Neacerea rufiventris (Schaus, 1894)
- Neacerea testacea (Druce, 1884)
