= Cercopimorpha homopteridia =

Scientific classification
- Domain: Eukaryota
- Kingdom: Animalia
- Phylum: Arthropoda
- Class: Insecta
- Order: Lepidoptera
- Superfamily: Noctuoidea
- Family: Erebidae
- Subfamily: Arctiinae
- Genus: Cercopimorpha
- Species: C. homopteridia

Binomial name
- Cercopimorpha homopteridia Butler, 1876

Synonyms
- Euchromia pectinata Walker, 1854 (not Fabricius)

Species of moth

Cercopimorpha homopteridia is a moth of the subfamily Arctiinae. It was described by Arthur Gardiner Butler in 1876. It is found in Brazil.
