= Delphyre hebes =

Scientific classification
- Kingdom: Animalia
- Phylum: Arthropoda
- Class: Insecta
- Order: Lepidoptera
- Superfamily: Noctuoidea
- Family: Erebidae
- Subfamily: Arctiinae
- Genus: Delphyre
- Species: D. hebes

Binomial name
- Delphyre hebes Walker, 1854

Synonyms
- Nodoza tristis Schaus, 1896

Species of moth

Delphyre hebes is a moth of the subfamily Arctiinae. It was described by Francis Walker in 1854. It is found in Honduras and São Paulo, Brazil.
