= Neacerea rufiventris =

Scientific classification
- Kingdom: Animalia
- Phylum: Arthropoda
- Clade: Pancrustacea
- Class: Insecta
- Order: Lepidoptera
- Superfamily: Noctuoidea
- Family: Erebidae
- Subfamily: Arctiinae
- Genus: Neacerea
- Species: N. rufiventris

Binomial name
- Neacerea rufiventris (Schaus, 1894)

Synonyms
- Aclytia rufiventris Schaus, 1894

Species of moth

Neacerea rufiventris is a moth of the subfamily Arctiinae. It was described by Schaus in 1894. It is found in Mexico, Bolivia and Honduras.
