= Neacerea testacea =

Scientific classification
- Domain: Eukaryota
- Kingdom: Animalia
- Phylum: Arthropoda
- Class: Insecta
- Order: Lepidoptera
- Superfamily: Noctuoidea
- Family: Erebidae
- Subfamily: Arctiinae
- Genus: Neacerea
- Species: N. testacea

Binomial name
- Neacerea testacea (H. Druce, 1884)

Synonyms
- Heliura testacea H. Druce, 1884; Delphyre testacea

Species of moth

Neacerea testacea is a moth of the subfamily Arctiinae. It was described by Herbert Druce in 1884. It is found in Guatemala, Panama and Honduras.
