= Delphyre tetilla =

Scientific classification
- Kingdom: Animalia
- Phylum: Arthropoda
- Clade: Pancrustacea
- Class: Insecta
- Order: Lepidoptera
- Superfamily: Noctuoidea
- Family: Erebidae
- Subfamily: Arctiinae
- Genus: Delphyre
- Species: D. tetilla

Binomial name
- Delphyre tetilla (Dognin, 1898)

Synonyms
- Neacerea tetilla Dognin, 1898; Delphyre tetilla coerulescens Dognin, 1919; Neacerea elegans Lathy, 1899; Delphyra elegans; Heliura bimaculata Rothschild, 1912; Cercopimorpha complexa Gaede, 1926

Species of moth

Delphyre tetilla is a moth of the subfamily Arctiinae. It was described by Paul Dognin in 1898. It is found in Ecuador, Colombia and Peru.
