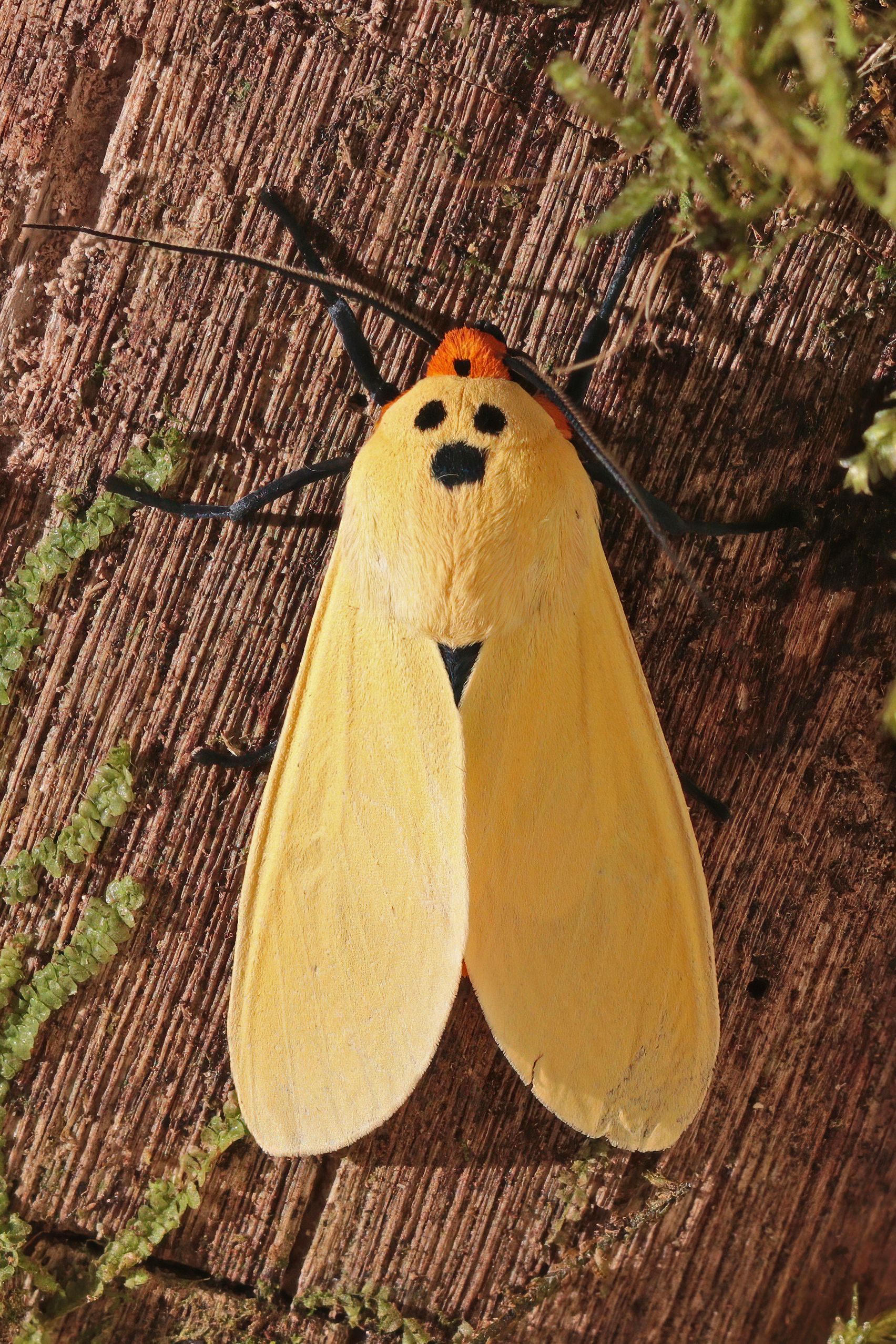
- S. schausi, Panama

Scientific classification
- Domain: Eukaryota
- Kingdom: Animalia
- Phylum: Arthropoda
- Class: Insecta
- Order: Lepidoptera
- Superfamily: Noctuoidea
- Family: Erebidae
- Subfamily: Arctiinae
- Subtribe: Phaegopterina
- Genus: Selenarctia; Watson, 1975

= Selenarctia =

Genus of moths

Selenarctia is a genus of moths in the family Erebidae.

== Species ==
- Selenarctia elissa Schaus, 1892
- Selenarctia elissoides Rothschild, 1909
- Selenarctia flavidorsata Watson, 1975
- Selenarctia pseudelissa Dognin, 1902
- Selenarctia schausi Rothschild, 1916
