= Selenarctia schausi =

Scientific classification
- Domain: Eukaryota
- Kingdom: Animalia
- Phylum: Arthropoda
- Class: Insecta
- Order: Lepidoptera
- Superfamily: Noctuoidea
- Family: Erebidae
- Subfamily: Arctiinae
- Genus: Selenarctia
- Species: S. schausi

Binomial name
- Selenarctia schausi (Rothschild, 1916)

Synonyms
- Automolis schausi Rothschild, 1916

Species of moth

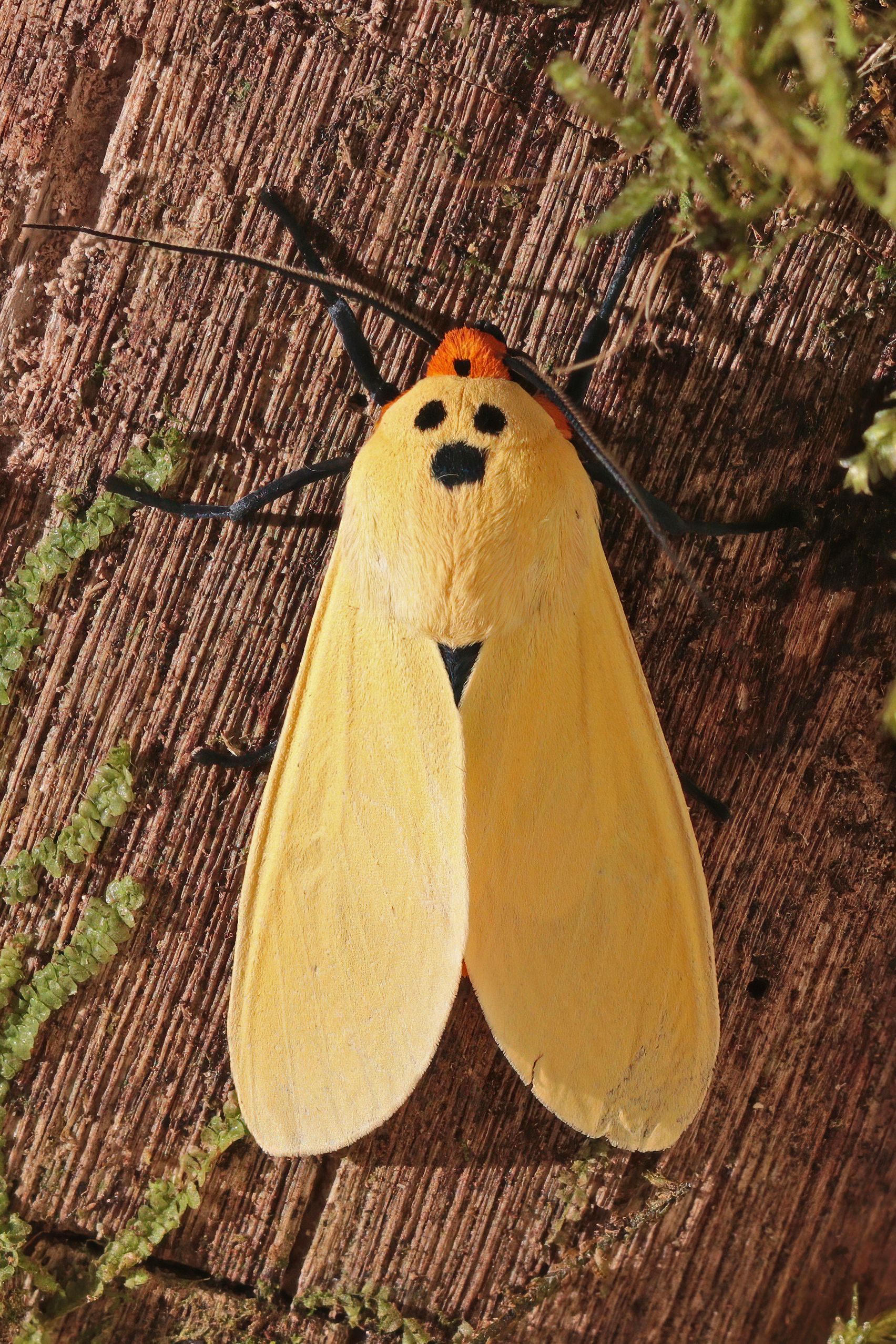
Selenarctia Moth, Mount Totumas Cloud Forest, Panama

Selenarctia schausi is a moth in the family Erebidae. It was described by Walter Rothschild in 1916. It is found in Panama and Costa Rica.
