= Selenarctia pseudelissa =

Scientific classification
- Domain: Eukaryota
- Kingdom: Animalia
- Phylum: Arthropoda
- Class: Insecta
- Order: Lepidoptera
- Superfamily: Noctuoidea
- Family: Erebidae
- Subfamily: Arctiinae
- Genus: Selenarctia
- Species: S. pseudelissa

Binomial name
- Selenarctia pseudelissa (Dognin, 1902)

Synonyms
- Automolis pseudelissa Dognin, 1902

Species of moth

Selenarctia pseudelissa is a moth in the family Erebidae. It was described by Paul Dognin in 1902. It is found in Venezuela.
