= Selenarctia flavidorsata =

Scientific classification
- Domain: Eukaryota
- Kingdom: Animalia
- Phylum: Arthropoda
- Class: Insecta
- Order: Lepidoptera
- Superfamily: Noctuoidea
- Family: Erebidae
- Subfamily: Arctiinae
- Genus: Selenarctia
- Species: S. flavidorsata

Binomial name
- Selenarctia flavidorsata Watson, 1975

Species of moth

Selenarctia flavidorsata is a moth in the family Erebidae. It was described by Watson in 1975. It is found in Brazil.
