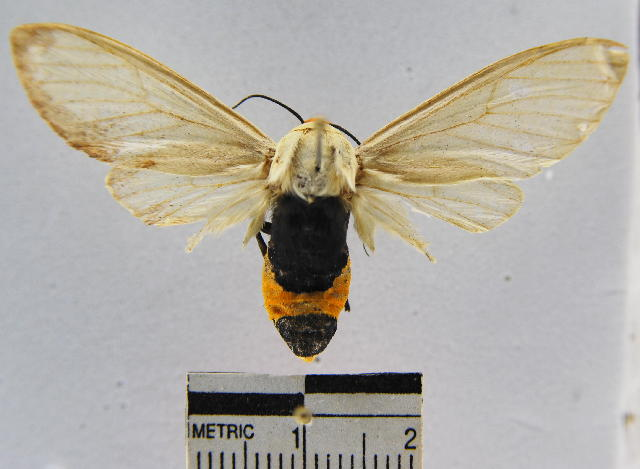

Scientific classification
- Domain: Eukaryota
- Kingdom: Animalia
- Phylum: Arthropoda
- Class: Insecta
- Order: Lepidoptera
- Superfamily: Noctuoidea
- Family: Erebidae
- Subfamily: Arctiinae
- Genus: Selenarctia
- Species: S. elissa

Binomial name
- Selenarctia elissa (Schaus, 1892)

Synonyms
- Automolis elissa Schaus, 1892

= Selenarctia elissa =

Species of moth

Selenarctia elissa is a moth in the family Erebidae. It was described by William Schaus in 1892. It is found in French Guiana, Suriname, Guyana, Brazil, Venezuela, Colombia, Ecuador, Peru and Bolivia.
