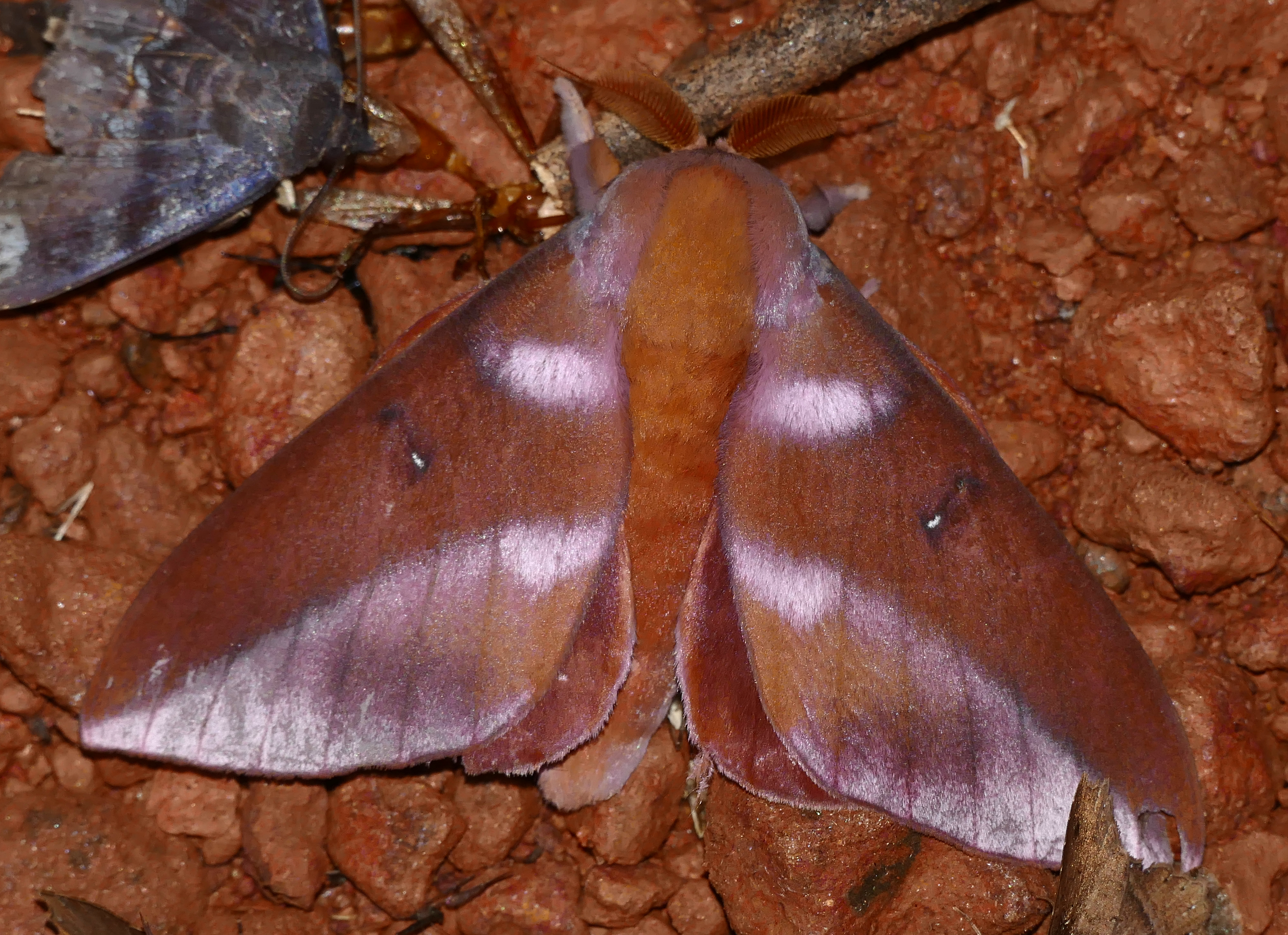

Scientific classification
- Kingdom: Animalia
- Phylum: Arthropoda
- Class: Insecta
- Order: Lepidoptera
- Family: Saturniidae
- Genus: Othorene
- Species: O. purpurascens

Binomial name
- Othorene purpurascens (Schaus, 1905)

Synonyms
- Adelocephala purpurascens Schaus, 1905

= Othorene purpurascens =

Species of moth

Othorene purpurascens is a species of moth of the family Saturniidae.

== Distribution ==
The species can be found in Belize and French Guiana and from Mexico to Bolivia.

== Subspecies ==
- Othorene purpurascens purpurascens
- Othorene purpurascens intermedia Rothschild, 1907
