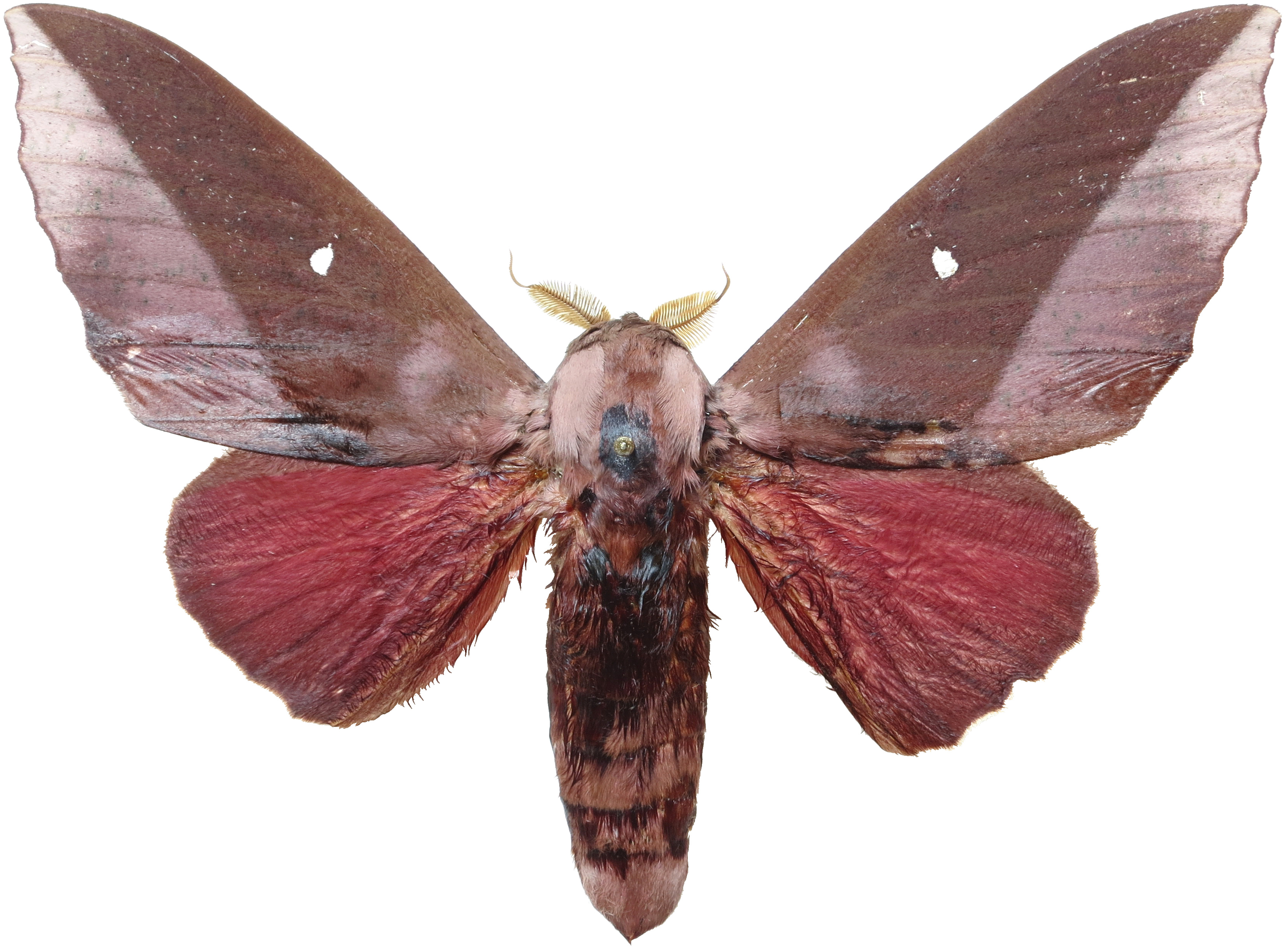
- Male Othorene hodeva

Scientific classification
- Domain: Eukaryota
- Kingdom: Animalia
- Phylum: Arthropoda
- Class: Insecta
- Order: Lepidoptera
- Family: Saturniidae
- Subfamily: Ceratocampinae
- Genus: Othorene; Boisduval, 1872

= Othorene =

Genus of moths

Othorene is a genus of moths of the family Saturniidae. The genus was erected by Jean Baptiste Boisduval in 1872.

== Species ==
The genus includes:

- Othorene cadmus (Herrich-Schäffer, 1854)
- Othorene hodeva (Druce, 1904)
- Othorene purpurascens (Schaus, 1905)—Mexico
- Othorene verana (Schaus, 1900)—from Mexico to Panama and Guatemala
