= Othorene verana =

Scientific classification
- Kingdom: Animalia
- Phylum: Arthropoda
- Class: Insecta
- Order: Lepidoptera
- Family: Saturniidae
- Genus: Othorene
- Species: O. verana

Binomial name
- Othorene verana Schaus, 1900

Species of moth

Othorene verana is a species of moth of the family Saturniidae.

== Distribution ==
The species can be found in Costa Rica, Guatemala, Nicaragua and Panama, on altitudes between 1,250 metres (4,100 ft) and 1,370 metres (4,490 ft).
