= Cratoplastis diluta =

Scientific classification
- Kingdom: Animalia
- Phylum: Arthropoda
- Class: Insecta
- Order: Lepidoptera
- Superfamily: Noctuoidea
- Family: Erebidae
- Subfamily: Arctiinae
- Genus: Cratoplastis
- Species: C. diluta

Binomial name
- Cratoplastis diluta Felder & Rogenhofer, 1874

Synonyms
- Automolis diluta; Cratoplastis fonteboae (Strand, 1919)

Species of moth

Cratoplastis diluta is a moth of the Erebidae family first described by Felder and Rogenhofer in 1874. It is found in French Guiana, Guyana, Brazil, Venezuela, Colombia, Ecuador, Peru, Bolivia, Panama, Costa Rica, Honduras and Mexico.
