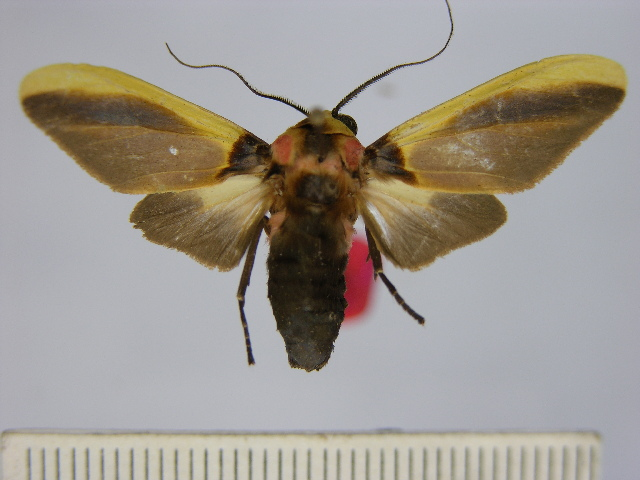

Scientific classification
- Domain: Eukaryota
- Kingdom: Animalia
- Phylum: Arthropoda
- Class: Insecta
- Order: Lepidoptera
- Superfamily: Noctuoidea
- Family: Erebidae
- Subfamily: Arctiinae
- Genus: Cratoplastis
- Species: C. catherinae

Binomial name
- Cratoplastis catherinae (Rothschild, 1916)

Synonyms
- Automolis catherinae Rothschild, 1916

= Cratoplastis catherinae =

Species of moth

Cratoplastis catherinae is a moth of the family Erebidae first described by Walter Rothschild in 1916. It is found in Brazil, Paraguay and Guatemala.
