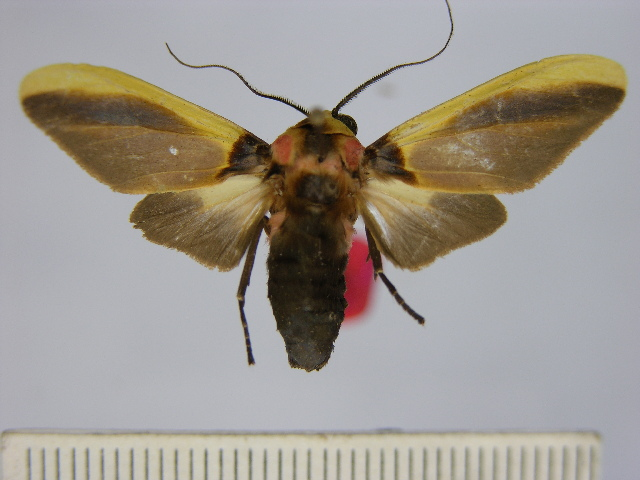
- Cratoplastis catherinae

Scientific classification
- Domain: Eukaryota
- Kingdom: Animalia
- Phylum: Arthropoda
- Class: Insecta
- Order: Lepidoptera
- Superfamily: Noctuoidea
- Family: Erebidae
- Subfamily: Arctiinae
- Subtribe: Phaegopterina
- Genus: Cratoplastis; Felder, 1874

= Cratoplastis =

Genus of moths

Cratoplastis is a genus of moths in the family Erebidae. The genus was described by Felder in 1874.

== Species ==
- Cratoplastis barrosi (Almeida, 1968) (from Brazil)
- Cratoplastis catherinae (Rothschild, 1916) (from Brazil)
- Cratoplastis diluta Felder & Rogenhofer, 1874 (from Central and South America)
- Cratoplastis rectiradia (Hampson, 1901) (from Suriname)
