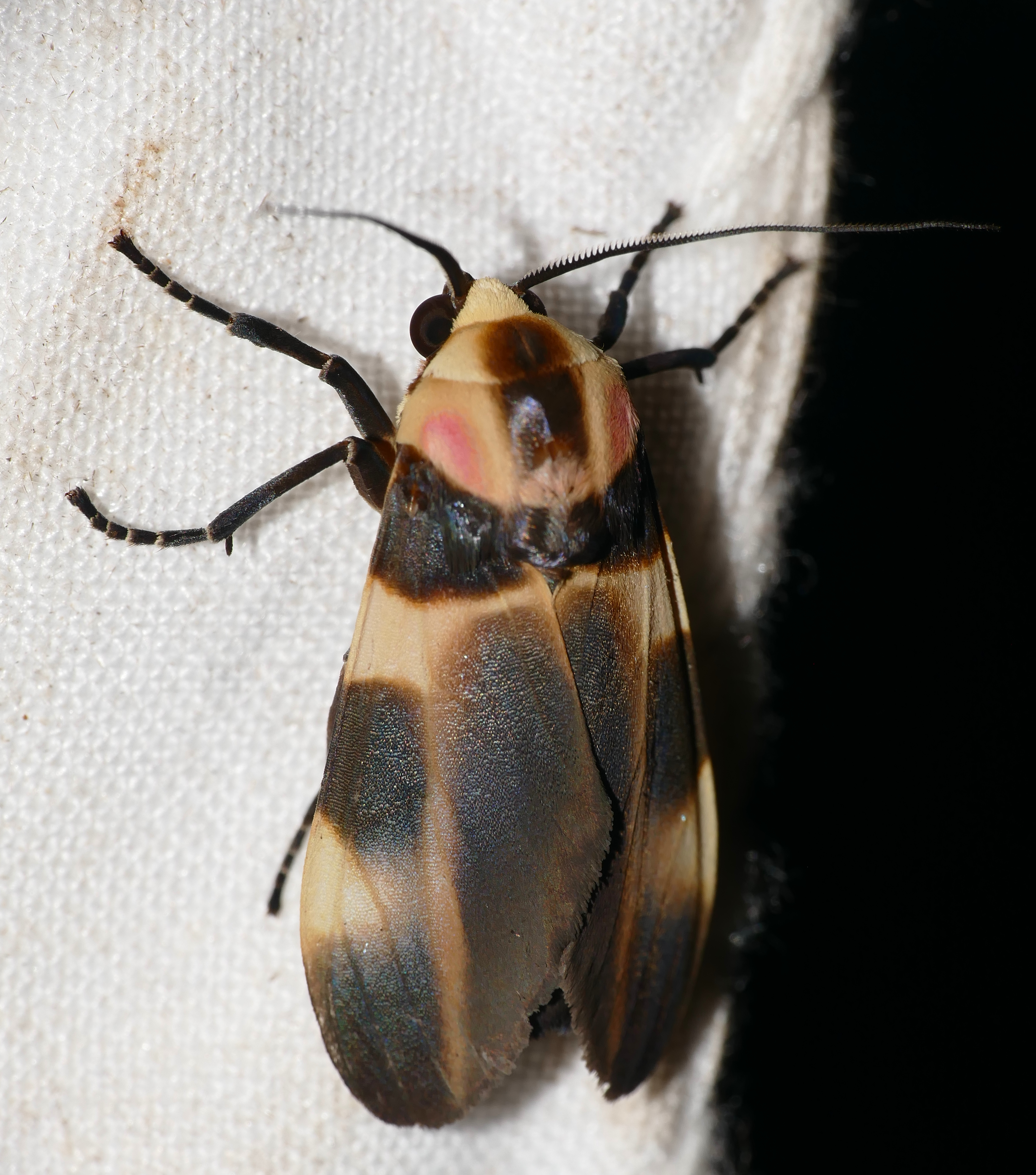

Scientific classification
- Kingdom: Animalia
- Phylum: Arthropoda
- Class: Insecta
- Order: Lepidoptera
- Superfamily: Noctuoidea
- Family: Erebidae
- Subfamily: Arctiinae
- Genus: Cratoplastis
- Species: C. rectiradia

Binomial name
- Cratoplastis rectiradia (Hampson, 1901)

Synonyms
- Automolis rectiradia Hampson, 1901

= Cratoplastis rectiradia =

Species of moth

Cratoplastis rectiradia is a moth of the family Erebidae first described by George Hampson in 1901. It is found in Peru, French Guiana, Suriname, the Amazon region and Bolivia.
