= Cratoplastis barrosi =

Scientific classification
- Domain: Eukaryota
- Kingdom: Animalia
- Phylum: Arthropoda
- Class: Insecta
- Order: Lepidoptera
- Superfamily: Noctuoidea
- Family: Erebidae
- Subfamily: Arctiinae
- Genus: Cratoplastis
- Species: C. barrosi

Binomial name
- Cratoplastis barrosi (Almeida, 1968)

Synonyms
- Rhipha barrosi Almeida, 1968

Species of moth

Cratoplastis barrosi is a moth of the family Erebidae first described by Romualdo Ferreira d'Almeida in 1968. It is found in French Guiana, Venezuela and the Brazilian state of Amapá.
