= Argyractoides rinconadalis =

Scientific classification
- Kingdom: Animalia
- Phylum: Arthropoda
- Class: Insecta
- Order: Lepidoptera
- Family: Crambidae
- Genus: Argyractoides
- Species: A. rinconadalis

Binomial name
- Argyractoides rinconadalis (Schaus, 1924)

Synonyms
- Argyractis rinconadalis Schaus, 1924

Species of moth

Argyractoides rinconadalis is a species of moth in the family Crambidae. It is found in Mexico.
