= Argyractoides volcanalis =

Scientific classification
- Kingdom: Animalia
- Phylum: Arthropoda
- Class: Insecta
- Order: Lepidoptera
- Family: Crambidae
- Genus: Argyractoides
- Species: A. volcanalis

Binomial name
- Argyractoides volcanalis (Schaus, 1912)

Synonyms
- Argyractis volcanalis Schaus, 1912

Species of moth

Argyractoides volcanalis is a species of moth in the family Crambidae. It is found in Costa Rica.
