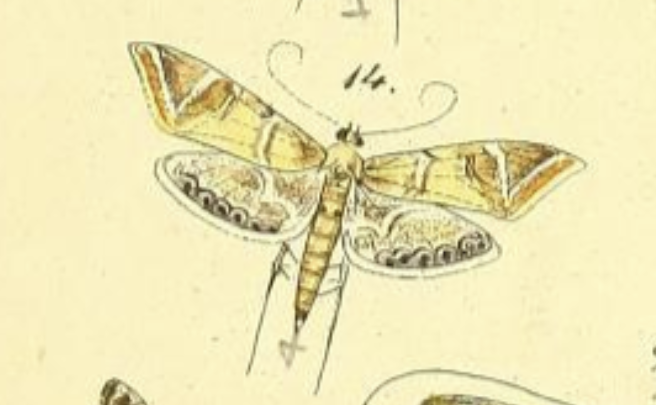
- 1875 illustration of Cataclysta samealis (now Argyractoides samealis)

Scientific classification
- Kingdom: Animalia
- Phylum: Arthropoda
- Class: Insecta
- Order: Lepidoptera
- Family: Crambidae
- Genus: Argyractoides
- Species: A. samealis

Binomial name
- Argyractoides samealis (C. Felder, R. Felder & Rogenhofer, 1875)

Synonyms
- Cataclysta samealis C. Felder, R. Felder & Rogenhofer, 1875

= Argyractoides samealis =

Species of moth

Argyractoides samealis is a species of moth in the family Crambidae. It is found in Colombia.
