= Argyractoides catenalis =

Scientific classification
- Kingdom: Animalia
- Phylum: Arthropoda
- Class: Insecta
- Order: Lepidoptera
- Family: Crambidae
- Genus: Argyractoides
- Species: A. catenalis

Binomial name
- Argyractoides catenalis (Guenée, 1854)

Synonyms
- Cataclysta catenalis Guenée, 1854

Species of moth

Argyractoides catenalis is a species of moth in the family Crambidae. It is found in Brazil.
