= Argyractoides productalis =

Scientific classification
- Kingdom: Animalia
- Phylum: Arthropoda
- Class: Insecta
- Order: Lepidoptera
- Family: Crambidae
- Genus: Argyractoides
- Species: A. productalis

Binomial name
- Argyractoides productalis (Hampson, 1917)

Synonyms
- Argyractis productalis Hampson, 1917

Species of moth

Argyractoides productalis is a species of moth in the family Crambidae. It is found in Peru.
