= Argyractoides cuprescens =

Scientific classification
- Kingdom: Animalia
- Phylum: Arthropoda
- Class: Insecta
- Order: Lepidoptera
- Family: Crambidae
- Genus: Argyractoides
- Species: A. cuprescens

Binomial name
- Argyractoides cuprescens (Hampson, 1917)

Synonyms
- Argyractis cuprescens Hampson, 1917

Species of moth

Argyractoides cuprescens is a species of moth in the family Crambidae. It is found in Ecuador.

Hampson described Argyractis cuprescens from one female collected at Rio Verde, Ecuador; the wingspan is 18 mm. The body (head, thorax, abdomen) is a coppery red-brown with some white, and the front of the head (frons) is white at the sides. The forewings are mainly coppery with a broad oblique silvery-white band, a white medial line edged in darker brown, and an orange-yellow discoidal bar; there are additional silvery wedge-shaped patches and an orange-yellow patch toward the wing's inner margin, plus a silvery subterminal band and an orange-yellow terminal band. The hindwings are silvery white with some brown at the base and a brown medial band that includes an orange-yellow patch; there's also an irregular white subterminal patch outlined in cupreous brown. A black terminal band from the apex to vein 2 contains five small iridescent silvery rings and is edged inwardly by a white line and a wavy dark line. The wing fringes (cilia) are mixed brown and white as described.
