= Argyractoides chalcistis =

Scientific classification
- Kingdom: Animalia
- Phylum: Arthropoda
- Class: Insecta
- Order: Lepidoptera
- Family: Crambidae
- Genus: Argyractoides
- Species: A. chalcistis

Binomial name
- Argyractoides chalcistis (Dognin, 1910)

Synonyms
- Argyractis chalcistis Dognin, 1910

Species of moth

Argyractoides chalcistis is a species of moth in the family Crambidae. It is found in south-eastern Peru.
