= Argyractoides leucogonialis =

Scientific classification
- Kingdom: Animalia
- Phylum: Arthropoda
- Class: Insecta
- Order: Lepidoptera
- Family: Crambidae
- Genus: Argyractoides
- Species: A. leucogonialis

Binomial name
- Argyractoides leucogonialis (Hampson, 1906)

Synonyms
- Argyractis leucogonialis Hampson, 1906

Species of moth

Argyractoides leucogonialis is a species of moth in the family Crambidae. It is found in Panama and Honduras.
