= Argyractoides =

Scientific classification
- Domain: Eukaryota
- Kingdom: Animalia
- Phylum: Arthropoda
- Class: Insecta
- Order: Lepidoptera
- Family: Crambidae
- Subfamily: Acentropinae
- Genus: Argyractoides; Lange, 1956

Genus of moths

Argyractoides is a genus of moths in the family Crambidae.

== Species ==
- Argyractoides albibasalis (Schaus, 1912)
- Argyractoides catenalis (Guenée, 1854)
- Argyractoides chalcistis (Dognin, 1910)
- Argyractoides cuprescens (Hampson, 1917)
- Argyractoides gontranalis (Schaus, 1924)
- Argyractoides leucogonialis Hampson, 1906
- Argyractoides lucianalis (Schaus, 1924)
- Argyractoides nitens (Schaus, 1912)
- Argyractoides productalis (Hampson, 1917)
- Argyractoides rinconadalis (Schaus, 1924)
- Argyractoides samealis (C. Felder, R. Felder & Rogenhofer, 1875)
- Argyractoides volcanalis (Schaus, 1912)
