= Argyractoides albibasalis =

Scientific classification
- Kingdom: Animalia
- Phylum: Arthropoda
- Class: Insecta
- Order: Lepidoptera
- Family: Crambidae
- Genus: Argyractoides
- Species: A. albibasalis

Binomial name
- Argyractoides albibasalis (Schaus, 1912)

Synonyms
- Argyractis albibasalis Schaus, 1912

Species of moth

Argyractoides albibasalis is a species of moth in the family Crambidae. It is found in Costa Rica.
