= Euchlorostola =

Scientific classification
- Domain: Eukaryota
- Kingdom: Animalia
- Phylum: Arthropoda
- Class: Insecta
- Order: Lepidoptera
- Superfamily: Noctuoidea
- Family: Erebidae
- Subfamily: Arctiinae
- Genus: Euchlorostola; Watson, 1980

Synonyms
- Chlorostola Hampson, 1898 (preocc.)

Genus of moths

Euchlorostola is a genus of moths in the subfamily Arctiinae. The genus was described by Watson in 1980.

== Species ==
- Euchlorostola anusia Schaus, 1924
- Euchlorostola corydon Druce, 1884
- Euchlorostola interrupta Walker, 1856
- Euchlorostola megathyris Hampson, 1914
