= Euchlorostola interrupta =

Scientific classification
- Kingdom: Animalia
- Phylum: Arthropoda
- Clade: Pancrustacea
- Class: Insecta
- Order: Lepidoptera
- Superfamily: Noctuoidea
- Family: Erebidae
- Subfamily: Arctiinae
- Genus: Euchlorostola
- Species: E. interrupta

Binomial name
- Euchlorostola interrupta (Walker, 1856)

Synonyms
- Calonota interrupta Walker, 1856

Species of moth

Euchlorostola interrupta is a moth of the subfamily Arctiinae. It was described by Francis Walker in 1856. It is found in Mexico.
