= Euchlorostola megathyris =

Scientific classification
- Kingdom: Animalia
- Phylum: Arthropoda
- Class: Insecta
- Order: Lepidoptera
- Superfamily: Noctuoidea
- Family: Erebidae
- Subfamily: Arctiinae
- Genus: Euchlorostola
- Species: E. megathyris

Binomial name
- Euchlorostola megathyris (Hampson, 1914)

Synonyms
- Chlorostola megathyris Hampson, 1914; Chlorostola ewardari Lichy, 1946

Species of moth

Euchlorostola megathyris is a moth of the subfamily Arctiinae. It was described by George Hampson in 1914. It is found in Venezuela.
