= Euchlorostola anusia =

Scientific classification
- Domain: Eukaryota
- Kingdom: Animalia
- Phylum: Arthropoda
- Class: Insecta
- Order: Lepidoptera
- Superfamily: Noctuoidea
- Family: Erebidae
- Subfamily: Arctiinae
- Genus: Euchlorostola
- Species: E. anusia

Binomial name
- Euchlorostola anusia (Schaus, 1924)

Synonyms
- Chlorostola anusia Schaus, 1924

Species of moth

Euchlorostola anusia is a moth of the subfamily Arctiinae. It was described by Schaus in 1924. It is found in Mexico and Guatemala.
