= Stenoma secundata =

Scientific classification
- Kingdom: Animalia
- Phylum: Arthropoda
- Class: Insecta
- Order: Lepidoptera
- Family: Depressariidae
- Genus: Stenoma
- Species: S. secundata

Binomial name
- Stenoma secundata Meyrick, 1925

Species of moth

Stenoma secundata is a moth of the family Depressariidae. It is found in Peru.

The wingspan is about 12 mm. The forewings are whitish brownish with the second discal stigma dark fuscous, the plical indicated by one or two scales. There are small triangular dark fuscous spots on the costa at the middle and three-fourths, from the second a curved series of faint dots of fuscous irroration to the tornus. There is also a marginal series of black dots around the apex and termen. The hindwings are grey.
