= Stenoma neurotona =

Scientific classification
- Domain: Eukaryota
- Kingdom: Animalia
- Phylum: Arthropoda
- Class: Insecta
- Order: Lepidoptera
- Family: Depressariidae
- Genus: Stenoma
- Species: S. neurotona

Binomial name
- Stenoma neurotona (Meyrick, 1915)

Synonyms
- Athleta neurotona Meyrick, 1915

Species of moth

Stenoma neurotona is a moth in the family Depressariidae. It was described by Edward Meyrick in 1915. It is found in Guyana.

The wingspan is about 14 mm. The forewings are light brownish with a somewhat thick blackish streak from the base of the costa along the dorsum to one-fourth. The stigmata are black, the plical obliquely beyond the first discal, the second discal merged in a slightly curved blackish streak which runs from three-fifths of the costa to the dorsum before the tornus. Beyond this streak, the apical area is wholly rather dark fuscous, with blackish lines on the veins and black marginal interneural dots or marks, the three nearest the apex preceded by ochreous-whitish suffusion. The hindwings are grey.
