= Stenoma symmicta =

Scientific classification
- Domain: Eukaryota
- Kingdom: Animalia
- Phylum: Arthropoda
- Class: Insecta
- Order: Lepidoptera
- Family: Depressariidae
- Genus: Stenoma
- Species: S. symmicta

Binomial name
- Stenoma symmicta Walsingham, 1913

Species of moth

Stenoma symmicta is a moth in the family Depressariidae. It was described by Lord Walsingham in 1913. It is found in Panama and Guyana.

The wingspan is about 17 mm. The forewings are white, much shaded and mottled with pale yellowish brown, forming a dorsal shade before the fold a streak along the lower edge of the cell and three costal patches irregularly attenuate downward to the cell—the first, at one-fifth, tending obliquely outward. The second and third, at equal distances, tending obliquely inward, the latter terminating in a fuscous spot at the end of the cell, beyond which is an outwardly bowed line of very faint yellowish brown dots, followed by a diffused shade before the termen. A brownish fuscous dot at the apex is followed by a white patch at the base of the pale aeneous cilia, and a line of the same colour follows the margin below it nearly to the tornus. On the underside the costa is narrowly stained with yellowish ochreous throughout, and two conspicuous fuscous dots lie in a white patch at the extreme apex. The hindwings are brownish grey, sinuate below the apex.
