= Stenoma hyacinthitis =

Scientific classification
- Domain: Eukaryota
- Kingdom: Animalia
- Phylum: Arthropoda
- Class: Insecta
- Order: Lepidoptera
- Family: Depressariidae
- Genus: Stenoma
- Species: S. hyacinthitis

Binomial name
- Stenoma hyacinthitis Meyrick, 1930

Species of moth

Stenoma hyacinthitis is a moth in the family Depressariidae. It was described by Edward Meyrick in 1930. It is found in Guyana.

The wingspan is about 16 mm.
