= Stenoma volitans =

Scientific classification
- Domain: Eukaryota
- Kingdom: Animalia
- Phylum: Arthropoda
- Class: Insecta
- Order: Lepidoptera
- Family: Depressariidae
- Genus: Stenoma
- Species: S. volitans

Binomial name
- Stenoma volitans Meyrick, 1925

Species of moth

Stenoma volitans is a moth of the family Depressariidae. It is found in Peru.

The wingspan is about 33 mm. The forewings are ochreous brown, on the posterior third thinly strewn with elongate flat pale violet-grey scales tipped blackish, a few also about the fold. The costal edge is ochreous rosy throughout, edged beneath with greyish violet. The plical and second discal stigmata are blackish. The hindwings are ochreous yellow.
