= Stenoma regesta =

Scientific classification
- Domain: Eukaryota
- Kingdom: Animalia
- Phylum: Arthropoda
- Class: Insecta
- Order: Lepidoptera
- Family: Depressariidae
- Genus: Stenoma
- Species: S. regesta

Binomial name
- Stenoma regesta Meyrick, 1925

Species of moth

Stenoma regesta is a moth of the family Depressariidae. It is found in Colombia and Peru.

The wingspan is 26–29 mm. The forewings are whitish ochreous, sometimes partially tinged brownish with eight elongate dark fuscous marks along the costa from one-fifth to the apex. There are three indistinct irregular dentate lines of fuscous or dark fuscous irroration from the costa anteriorly, the first two nearly obsolete in the disc but forming irregular spots of dark fuscous suffusion on the dorsum before and beyond the middle, the third directed towards the tornus but becoming obsolete. The stigmata are small and dark fuscous, the plical very obliquely beyond the first discal. There is a waved fuscous shade just below the costa on the posterior half and there is some irregular marking of dark fuscous suffusion below the middle of the termen and on the tornus. There is also a terminal series of dark fuscous dots. The hindwings are light grey, the apical edge suffused whitish ochreous.
