= Stenoma holophaea =

Scientific classification
- Kingdom: Animalia
- Phylum: Arthropoda
- Clade: Pancrustacea
- Class: Insecta
- Order: Lepidoptera
- Family: Depressariidae
- Genus: Stenoma
- Species: S. holophaea

Binomial name
- Stenoma holophaea (Meyrick, 1916)

Synonyms
- Baeonoma holophaea Meyrick, 1916

Species of moth

Stenoma holophaea is a moth of the family Depressariidae. It is found in French Guiana.

The wingspan is about 18 mm. The forewings are rather dark brown and the hindwings are dark grey.
