= Stenoma iostalacta =

Scientific classification
- Domain: Eukaryota
- Kingdom: Animalia
- Phylum: Arthropoda
- Class: Insecta
- Order: Lepidoptera
- Family: Depressariidae
- Genus: Stenoma
- Species: S. iostalacta

Binomial name
- Stenoma iostalacta Meyrick, 1925

Species of moth

Stenoma iostalacta is a moth of the family Depressariidae. It is found in Peru.

The wingspan is about 24 mm. The forewings are pale grey with the costal edge pale ochreous. The markings are light ferruginous brownish, darker towards the costa and partially on the edges. There is a dot near the base in the middle and a triangular patch extending on the dorsum from near the base to the middle, its apex confluent with a spot on the costa at one-third, its posterior edge with a projection in the disc. A transverse-oval spot represents the second discal stigma and there is a triangular spot on the middle of the costa, where a shade, strongly excurved beyond the second discal stigma, runs to the dorsum at three-fourths, its extremity produced each way on the dorsal edge. There is a larger triangular spot on the costa at three-fourths, where a gently curved series of small cloudy spots runs to the tornus. There is also a marginal series of blackish dots around the apex and termen. The hindwings are light grey.
