= Stenoma futura =

Scientific classification
- Kingdom: Animalia
- Phylum: Arthropoda
- Class: Insecta
- Order: Lepidoptera
- Family: Depressariidae
- Genus: Stenoma
- Species: S. futura

Binomial name
- Stenoma futura Meyrick, 1913

Species of moth

Stenoma futura is a moth in the family Depressariidae. It was described by Edward Meyrick in 1913. It is found in Peru.

The wingspan is 32–38 mm. The forewings are rather light fuscous, with a faint lilac tinge and with the costal edge whitish ochreous. The stigmata are dark fuscous, the plical and first discal very indistinct or almost obsolete, the plical somewhat beyond the first discal, the second discal small and distinct. There is a very faint slightly bent shade of darker irroration crossing the wing just beyond the second discal and a series of indistinct dots of dark fuscous irroration from three-fourths of the costa to the dorsum before the tornus, strongly curved outward in the disc, somewhat sinuate inwards towards the extremities. There is a series of dark fuscous dots around the apex and termen. The hindwings are grey, somewhat lighter anteriorly.
