= Stenoma niphochlaena =

Scientific classification
- Kingdom: Animalia
- Phylum: Arthropoda
- Class: Insecta
- Order: Lepidoptera
- Family: Depressariidae
- Genus: Stenoma
- Species: S. niphochlaena

Binomial name
- Stenoma niphochlaena (Meyrick, 1926)

Synonyms
- Ptilogenes niphochlaena Meyrick, 1926; Chlamydastis niphochlaena

Species of moth

Stenoma niphochlaena is a moth of the family Depressariidae. It is found in Peru.

The wingspan is about 25 mm (0.98 in). The forewings are fuscous, slightly purplish tinged, more or less sprinkled darker. There is an irregular-edged white basal patch occupying about one-third of the wing, angulated and prominent on the fold. There is some darker suffusion towards the costa beyond this, and about the middle. The second discal stigma is moderately large and dark fuscous and there is a terminal series of cloudy dark fuscous dots. The hindwings are grey.
