= Stenoma anaxesta =

Scientific classification
- Domain: Eukaryota
- Kingdom: Animalia
- Phylum: Arthropoda
- Class: Insecta
- Order: Lepidoptera
- Family: Depressariidae
- Genus: Stenoma
- Species: S. anaxesta

Binomial name
- Stenoma anaxesta Meyrick, 1915

Species of moth

Stenoma anaxesta is a moth of the family Oecophoridae. It is found in Guyana and French Guiana.

The wingspan is about 23 mm. The forewings are very pale greyish ochreous, suffused with whitish between the veins and with the costal edge whitish. The stigmata are dark fuscous, the plical very obliquely beyond the first discal, the second discal transverse-linear. There are two transverse series of cloudy fuscous dots, the first from beneath the costa at two-fifths very obliquely outwards, forming a quadrate loop behind the cell and returning to beneath the origin of vein 2, then to the dorsum at two-thirds, the second from four-fifths of the costa to the dorsum before the tornus, rather strongly sinuate-indented beneath the costa, then rather strongly curved outwards. There is also a marginal series of blackish dots around the apex and termen. The hindwings are ochreous whitish.
