= Stenoma ovatella =

Scientific classification
- Domain: Eukaryota
- Kingdom: Animalia
- Phylum: Arthropoda
- Class: Insecta
- Order: Lepidoptera
- Family: Depressariidae
- Genus: Stenoma
- Species: S. ovatella

Binomial name
- Stenoma ovatella (Walker, 1864)

Synonyms
- Cryptolechia ovatella Walker, 1864; Cryptolechia genetta Felder & Rogenhofer, 1875

Species of moth

Stenoma ovatella is a moth in the family Depressariidae. It was described by Francis Walker in 1864. It is found in Brazil (Amazonas) and Colombia.

Adults are very pale ochraceous, with the forewings rounded at the tips, and with a short longitudinal ferruginous streak in the disc before the middle, and with an oblique irregular interrupted ferruginous line, which extends to the costa beyond the middle. There is a submarginal line like the preceding one but less distinct and the costa is very slightly convex, while the exterior border is convex, but not oblique. The hindwings are cinereous brown.
