= Stenoma hydraena =

Scientific classification
- Domain: Eukaryota
- Kingdom: Animalia
- Phylum: Arthropoda
- Class: Insecta
- Order: Lepidoptera
- Family: Depressariidae
- Genus: Stenoma
- Species: S. hydraena

Binomial name
- Stenoma hydraena Meyrick, 1916

Species of moth

Stenoma hydraena is a moth of the family Depressariidae. It is found in the French Guiana.

The wingspan is 16–17 mm. The forewings are glossy dark indigo-blue grey, the costa suffused with purple and with a pale violet-grey patch occupying the median third of the dorsal area, with a small dark ferruginous-brown spot on the fold preceding it, and followed by an erect dark ferruginous-brown streak from the dorsum, terminated above by a round black spot edged with white, representing the second discal stigma. There is a rather curved thick shade of whitish suffusion from beneath the middle of the costa beyond the cell to the tornus, including three or four indistinct blackish dots in its upper portion. There are some indistinct small blackish dots on the terminal margin. The hindwings are dark grey.
