= Stenoma symphonica =

Scientific classification
- Domain: Eukaryota
- Kingdom: Animalia
- Phylum: Arthropoda
- Class: Insecta
- Order: Lepidoptera
- Family: Depressariidae
- Genus: Stenoma
- Species: S. symphonica

Binomial name
- Stenoma symphonica Meyrick, 1916

Species of moth

Stenoma symphonica is a moth of the family Depressariidae. It is found in French Guiana and Panama.

The wingspan is 30–33 mm. The forewings are pale violet grey with the costal edge yellowish ferruginous and dark violet-fuscous markings. The discal stigmata are small, the second transverse. There is a transverse blotch on the middle of the dorsum, widened downwards, reaching half across the wing between the stigmata. A small spot is found on the middle of the costa, where a faint strongly bisinuate line runs to the dorsum at three-fourths. There is a wedge-shaped spot along the posterior fourth of the costa to near the apex, sending from the anterior extremity a curved row of small blackish dots to just before the tornus and there is also a terminal row of indistinct blackish dots. The hindwings are light ochreous yellowish, the dorsal half suffused with light grey and the apical edge greyish.
