= Stenoma finitrix =

Scientific classification
- Domain: Eukaryota
- Kingdom: Animalia
- Phylum: Arthropoda
- Class: Insecta
- Order: Lepidoptera
- Family: Depressariidae
- Genus: Stenoma
- Species: S. finitrix

Binomial name
- Stenoma finitrix Meyrick, 1925

Species of moth

Stenoma finitrix is a moth of the family Depressariidae. It is found in Colombia and Bolivia.

The wingspan is 18–21 mm. The forewings are dark purplish grey with the costa slenderly pale ochreous yellow from the base to four-fifths, where a marginal series of white marks extends around the apex and termen. There are three cloudy whitish dots in an indented series from the middle of the costa, a crescentic mark on the end of cell, and a cloudy dot on the fold beneath this. The hindwings are dark grey.
