= Stenoma libertina =

Scientific classification
- Domain: Eukaryota
- Kingdom: Animalia
- Phylum: Arthropoda
- Class: Insecta
- Order: Lepidoptera
- Family: Depressariidae
- Genus: Stenoma
- Species: S. libertina

Binomial name
- Stenoma libertina Meyrick, 1916

Species of moth

Stenoma libertina is a moth of the family Depressariidae. It is found in French Guiana.

The wingspan is about 26 mm. The forewings are lilac whitish and the stigmata are small and dark grey, the plical obliquely beyond the first discal. There is some slight grey suffusion beyond the second discal and a marginal series of dark fuscous dots around the apex and termen. The hindwings are ochreous whitish.
