= Stenoma vaccula =

Scientific classification
- Domain: Eukaryota
- Kingdom: Animalia
- Phylum: Arthropoda
- Class: Insecta
- Order: Lepidoptera
- Family: Depressariidae
- Genus: Stenoma
- Species: S. vaccula

Binomial name
- Stenoma vaccula Walsingham, 1913

Species of moth

Stenoma vaccula is a moth in the family Depressariidae. It was described by Lord Walsingham in 1913. It is found in Durango, Mexico.

The wingspan is about 21 mm. The forewings are pale fawn ochreous throughout. The hindwings are pale tawny brownish grey.
