= Stenoma zobeida =

Scientific classification
- Kingdom: Animalia
- Phylum: Arthropoda
- Class: Insecta
- Order: Lepidoptera
- Family: Depressariidae
- Genus: Stenoma
- Species: S. zobeida

Binomial name
- Stenoma zobeida Meyrick, 1931

Synonyms
- Stenoma orthopa Meyrick, 1932

Species of moth

Stenoma zobeida is a moth in the family Depressariidae. It was described by Edward Meyrick in 1931. It is found in Mexico and Panama.
