= Stenoma nycteropa =

Scientific classification
- Domain: Eukaryota
- Kingdom: Animalia
- Phylum: Arthropoda
- Class: Insecta
- Order: Lepidoptera
- Family: Depressariidae
- Genus: Stenoma
- Species: S. nycteropa

Binomial name
- Stenoma nycteropa Meyrick, 1915

Species of moth

Stenoma nycteropa is a moth of the family Depressariidae. It is found in Guyana.

The wingspan is 14–15 mm. The forewings are dark fuscous with the veins towards the costa slightly indicated with whitish and with the extreme costal edge whitish from one-fourth onwards. There is an indistinct whitish pre-marginal line around the apex and termen. The hindwings are dark fuscous.
