= Stenoma gemellata =

Scientific classification
- Domain: Eukaryota
- Kingdom: Animalia
- Phylum: Arthropoda
- Class: Insecta
- Order: Lepidoptera
- Family: Depressariidae
- Genus: Stenoma
- Species: S. gemellata

Binomial name
- Stenoma gemellata Meyrick, 1916

Species of moth

Stenoma gemellata is a moth of the family Depressariidae. It is found in French Guiana.

The wingspan is 17–18 mm. The forewings are whitish with the stigmata black, the plical and first discal large and round, the plical very obliquely posterior, the second discal small and transverse. There are some scattered blackish scales above and beyond the cell scarcely indicating a postmedian line and there is a curved line of cloudy dots of blackish irroration from four-fifths of the costa to the dorsum before the tornus, indented above the middle. A marginal series of black dots is found around the apex and termen. The hindwings are whitish.
