= Stenoma phaeomystis =

Scientific classification
- Domain: Eukaryota
- Kingdom: Animalia
- Phylum: Arthropoda
- Class: Insecta
- Order: Lepidoptera
- Family: Depressariidae
- Genus: Stenoma
- Species: S. phaeomystis

Binomial name
- Stenoma phaeomystis Meyrick, 1925

Synonyms
- Stenoma phaeomistis

Species of moth

Stenoma phaeomystis is a moth of the family Depressariidae. It is found in Peru.

The wingspan is about 27 mm. The forewings are violet fuscous, becoming ochreous brown towards the costa posteriorly, and dark purple brown towards the dorsum and termen. The dorsal edge is suffused blackish. The hindwings are grey irrorated blackish.
