= Stenoma anconitis =

Scientific classification
- Domain: Eukaryota
- Kingdom: Animalia
- Phylum: Arthropoda
- Class: Insecta
- Order: Lepidoptera
- Family: Depressariidae
- Genus: Stenoma
- Species: S. anconitis

Binomial name
- Stenoma anconitis Meyrick, 1915

Species of moth

Stenoma anconitis is a moth in the family Depressariidae. It was described by Edward Meyrick in 1915. It is found in Guyana.

The wingspan is about 17 mm. The forewings are rather dark brownish grey with the costal and terminal edge ochreous white. There is a slender cloudy ochreous-whitish streak from beneath the costa before the middle to the dorsum at two-thirds, obtusely angulated in the middle, thicker on the lower half. The hindwings are dark grey.
