= Stenoma columbaris =

Scientific classification
- Domain: Eukaryota
- Kingdom: Animalia
- Phylum: Arthropoda
- Class: Insecta
- Order: Lepidoptera
- Family: Depressariidae
- Genus: Stenoma
- Species: S. columbaris

Binomial name
- Stenoma columbaris Meyrick, 1909

Species of moth

Stenoma columbaris is a moth in the family Depressariidae. It was described by Edward Meyrick in 1909. It is found in Peru.

The wingspan is about 28 mm. The forewings are fuscous suffused with whitish, appearing whitish fuscous. The extreme costal edge is ochreous white and the stigmata are dark fuscous, with the discal remote, connected by a suffused ochreous-whitish streak, the plical obliquely beyond the first discal. There are two dark fuscous dots towards the costa, the first above the plical stigma, the second beyond the middle. Some fuscous suffusion is found towards the dorsum in the middle, and there is an indistinct irregularly dentate fuscous line from the costa beyond the middle to two-thirds of the dorsum. A curved line of dark fuscous dots runs from three-fourths of the costa to the dorsum before the tornus, indented near the costa and there is a series of dark fuscous dots around the apical fourth of the costa and termen. The hindwings are rather light fuscous, darker towards the apex.
