= Stenoma caryodesma =

Scientific classification
- Domain: Eukaryota
- Kingdom: Animalia
- Phylum: Arthropoda
- Class: Insecta
- Order: Lepidoptera
- Family: Depressariidae
- Genus: Stenoma
- Species: S. caryodesma

Binomial name
- Stenoma caryodesma Meyrick, 1925

Species of moth

Stenoma caryodesma is a moth of the family Depressariidae. It is found in Peru.

The wingspan is about 11 mm. The forewings are greyish ochreous, mostly suffused grey irrorated dark grey and with a slight blackish dash near the base above the middle and three rather oblique irregular chestnut-brown fasciae, the first from towards the costa at one-fourth to the dorsum at three-fifths, the second from the middle of the costa to the dorsum at four-fifths, the third from three-fourths of the costa to the tornus, the apical area beyond this pale ochreous with slight grey irroration. There are also five blackish marginal dots, the largest on each side of the apex. The hindwings are dark grey.
