= Stenoma emphanes =

Scientific classification
- Kingdom: Animalia
- Phylum: Arthropoda
- Class: Insecta
- Order: Lepidoptera
- Family: Depressariidae
- Genus: Stenoma
- Species: S. emphanes

Binomial name
- Stenoma emphanes Meyrick, 1917

Species of moth

Stenoma emphanes is a moth in the family Depressariidae. It was described by Edward Meyrick in 1917. It is found in Burma.

The wingspan is about 20 mm. The forewings are whitish ochreous and the hindwings are light grey.
