= Stenoma pyrrhias =

Scientific classification
- Domain: Eukaryota
- Kingdom: Animalia
- Phylum: Arthropoda
- Class: Insecta
- Order: Lepidoptera
- Family: Depressariidae
- Genus: Stenoma
- Species: S. pyrrhias

Binomial name
- Stenoma pyrrhias Meyrick, 1915

Species of moth

Stenoma pyrrhias is a moth of the family Depressariidae. It is found in Guyana.

The wingspan is 18–22 mm. The forewings are violet-ochreous brown with the costal edge yellow ochreous. The plical and second discal stigmata are rather dark violet fuscous, cloudy and obscure. The hindwings are dull fulvous.
