= Stenoma peronia =

Scientific classification
- Domain: Eukaryota
- Kingdom: Animalia
- Phylum: Arthropoda
- Class: Insecta
- Order: Lepidoptera
- Family: Depressariidae
- Genus: Stenoma
- Species: S. peronia

Binomial name
- Stenoma peronia Busck, 1913

Synonyms
- Stenoma ebria Meyrick, 1915

Species of moth

Stenoma peronia is a moth of the family Depressariidae. It is found in Venezuela and Guyana.

The wingspan is about 16 mm. The forewings are pale fuscous, irrorated with whitish and somewhat sprinkled with blackish. There is a dark reddish-fuscous triangular blotch extending on the costa from the middle to four-fifths, and reaching more than one-third across the wing, edged anteriorly with whitish, and cut near its middle by an oblique strigula of ground colour from the costa. A fine transverse-linear blackish mark or pair of connected dots is found on the end of the cell and there are two rather curved series of cloudy dots of blackish irroration running from this blotch posteriorly to the dorsum towards the tornus. The hindwings are light grey.
