= Stenoma himerodes =

Scientific classification
- Kingdom: Animalia
- Phylum: Arthropoda
- Clade: Pancrustacea
- Class: Insecta
- Order: Lepidoptera
- Family: Depressariidae
- Genus: Stenoma
- Species: S. himerodes

Binomial name
- Stenoma himerodes Meyrick, 1916

Species of moth

Stenoma himerodes is a moth of the family Depressariidae. It is found in French Guiana.

The wingspan is13–15 millimetres (0.5–0.6 in). The forewings are violet-grey whitish, slightly speckled with light grey. There is a blackish basal dot in the middle and an irregular more or less interrupted dark violet-fuscous line from one-fourth of the costa to the middle of the dorsum, posteriorly edged with ferruginous-yellow suffusion in the disc. A small dark violet-fuscous spot is found on the middle of the costa, the second discal stigma dark fuscous, and one or two dots tinged with yellow between these, as well as a somewhat curved blackish-grey line from three-fourths of the costa to the tornus, the apical area beyond this greyish violet. A marginal series of blackish dots is found around this area. The hindwings are ochreous whitish.
