= Stenoma vivax =

Scientific classification
- Kingdom: Animalia
- Phylum: Arthropoda
- Class: Insecta
- Order: Lepidoptera
- Family: Depressariidae
- Genus: Stenoma
- Species: S. vivax

Binomial name
- Stenoma vivax Busck, 1914

Species of moth

Stenoma vivax is a moth in the family Depressariidae. It was described by August Busck in 1914. It is found in Panama.

The wingspan is about 26 mm (1.0 in). The forewings are light pearly grey with all the veins clearly and thinly outlined in dark lead grey and with the dorsal space below the fold shaded with the same darker color. The extreme base of the costa is black. The hindwings are light grey.
