= Stenoma bathrogramma =

Scientific classification
- Domain: Eukaryota
- Kingdom: Animalia
- Phylum: Arthropoda
- Class: Insecta
- Order: Lepidoptera
- Family: Depressariidae
- Genus: Stenoma
- Species: S. bathrogramma

Binomial name
- Stenoma bathrogramma (Meyrick, 1912)

Synonyms
- Orphnolechia bathrogramma Meyrick, 1912

Species of moth

Stenoma bathrogramma is a moth of the family Depressariidae. It is found in Venezuela.

The wingspan is about 12 mm. The forewings are whitish closely irrorated with brownish and with a dark fuscous streak from the base of the costa almost along the dorsal edge to one-fourth of the dorsum. The plical stigma obliquely beyond the first discal, both dark fuscous. There is a slightly curved dark fuscous streak from beyond the middle of the costa to the dorsum before the tornus, more brownish posteriorly and edged with whitish anteriorly. There is a curved series of several small dark fuscous spots crossing the wing from two-thirds of the costa to the tornus and a series of dark fuscous marks around the posterior part of the costa and termen. The hindwings are grey whitish.
