= Stenoma charitarcha =

Scientific classification
- Kingdom: Animalia
- Phylum: Arthropoda
- Clade: Pancrustacea
- Class: Insecta
- Order: Lepidoptera
- Family: Depressariidae
- Genus: Stenoma
- Species: S. charitarcha

Binomial name
- Stenoma charitarcha Meyrick, 1915

Species of moth

Stenoma charitarcha is a moth belonging to the Depressariidae family and is found in Guyana.

The wingspan is about 16 mm. The forewings are typically white, sometimes with a dark grey subbasal dot in the middle . Additionally, a highly oblique series of four grey dots extends from one-fifth of the costa to the fold. A distinctly irregular, angulated-dentate dark grey line from a mark on the costa before the middle to beyond the middle of the dorsum, traversing the end of the cell, on which are two darker dots. Sometimes, there is a grey spot beyond the end of the cell and there are five dark grey marks on the posterior half of the costa, beneath these a triangular spot of grey suffusion at three-fourths, where a line of cloudy-grey dots, strongly curved outwards in the disc, runs to four-fifths of the dorsum. There is an interrupted dark fuscous terminal line. The hindwings are whitish, towards the apex slightly greyish tinged and with a rather dark fuscous terminal line.
