= Stenoma impurata =

Scientific classification
- Domain: Eukaryota
- Kingdom: Animalia
- Phylum: Arthropoda
- Class: Insecta
- Order: Lepidoptera
- Family: Depressariidae
- Genus: Stenoma
- Species: S. impurata

Binomial name
- Stenoma impurata Meyrick, 1915

Species of moth

Stenoma impurata is a moth of the family Depressariidae. It is found in Suriname.

The wingspan is about 17 mm. The forewings and hindwings are ochreous whitish.
