= Stenoma niphacma =

Scientific classification
- Domain: Eukaryota
- Kingdom: Animalia
- Phylum: Arthropoda
- Class: Insecta
- Order: Lepidoptera
- Family: Depressariidae
- Genus: Stenoma
- Species: S. niphacma

Binomial name
- Stenoma niphacma Meyrick, 1916

Species of moth

Stenoma niphacma is a moth of the family Depressariidae. It is found in French Guiana.

The wingspan is about 15 mm. The forewings are dark slaty fuscous with the costal edge white from one-fourth onwards and with a white slightly irregular line from before the middle of the costa to two-thirds of the dorsum. There is a narrow white apical patch, attenuated to below the middle of the termen, marked with three blackish dots on the apical edge. The hindwings are rather dark grey.
