= Stenoma dasyneura =

Scientific classification
- Kingdom: Animalia
- Phylum: Arthropoda
- Class: Insecta
- Order: Lepidoptera
- Family: Depressariidae
- Genus: Stenoma
- Species: S. dasyneura

Binomial name
- Stenoma dasyneura Meyrick, 1922

Species of moth

Stenoma dasyneura is a moth in the family Depressariidae. It was described by Edward Meyrick in 1922. It is found in French Guiana.

The wingspan is about 28 mm. The forewings are light brownish ochreous, more or less suffused light violet brownish on the dorsal two-thirds from the base to the end of the cell, towards the costa anteriorly more yellowish tinged. The plical and second discal stigmata are obscure and fuscous and there is a rather curved subterminal series of fuscous dots on the discal third. The hindwings are light grey, the costal area ochreous whitish and the upper margin of the cell clothed with long ochreous-whitish hairscales from the base to the middle of the wing.
