= Stenoma cymbalista =

Scientific classification
- Kingdom: Animalia
- Phylum: Arthropoda
- Clade: Pancrustacea
- Class: Insecta
- Order: Lepidoptera
- Family: Depressariidae
- Genus: Stenoma
- Species: S. cymbalista

Binomial name
- Stenoma cymbalista Meyrick, 1918

Species of moth

Stenoma cymbalista is a moth in the family Depressariidae. It was described by Edward Meyrick in 1918. It is found in French Guiana.

The wingspan is about 21 mm. The forewings are grey whitish, very faintly violet tinged and with the extreme costal edge white. The markings are dark grey. The first discal stigma forms a large round spot, others are dot like, the plical very obliquely beyond the first discal and there is a triangular spot on the middle of the costa, where a strongly excurved shade of irroration runs to a cloudy patch on the middle of the dorsum. There is also a large triangular spot on the costa at four-fifths, where a curved series of dots runs to the dorsum before the tornus. A marginal series of ten elongate dots is found around the apex and termen. The hindwings are ochreous whitish, with the apical edge greyish tinged.
