= Stenoma compsocharis =

Scientific classification
- Domain: Eukaryota
- Kingdom: Animalia
- Phylum: Arthropoda
- Class: Insecta
- Order: Lepidoptera
- Family: Depressariidae
- Genus: Stenoma
- Species: S. compsocharis

Binomial name
- Stenoma compsocharis Meyrick, 1925

Species of moth

Stenoma compsocharis is a moth of the family Depressariidae. It is found in Bolivia. The wingspan is about 23 mm. The forewings are white, somewhat sprinkled fuscous in the disc and with the extreme edge of the costa towards the base and a basal dot dark fuscous. There is a small cloudy fuscous spot on the costa at one-fifth, a larger one at two-fifths, and a still larger triangular spot at two-thirds including a whitish costal dot. The stigmata are small, indistinct and dark fuscous, the plical obliquely beyond the first discal. There is a large fuscous dot on the costa at four-fifths, beneath this an angulated transverse series of minute dots. A fuscous dot is found on the costa near the apex, and there is a terminal series of minute indistinct dots. The hindwings are white, with the apical and terminal edge interruptedly grey.
