= Stenoma aggregata =

Scientific classification
- Domain: Eukaryota
- Kingdom: Animalia
- Phylum: Arthropoda
- Class: Insecta
- Order: Lepidoptera
- Family: Depressariidae
- Genus: Stenoma
- Species: S. aggregata

Binomial name
- Stenoma aggregata Meyrick, 1916

Species of moth

Stenoma aggregata is a moth of the family Depressariidae. It is found in French Guiana.

The wingspan is about 19 mm. The forewings are greyish ochreous, faintly brownish tinged and with a series of three black dots from beneath the costa near the base to above the dorsum at two-fifths, the first and third large. The stigmata are black, the first discal large, the others small, the plical obliquely beyond the first discal, an additional small dot obliquely before and above the first discal. There is a large black dot beneath the costa before the middle, where an irregular series of small indistinct blackish dots runs beyond the cell almost to the dorsal extremity of the following. A strongly curved series of small blackish dots is found from three-fourths of the costa to the dorsum before the tornus, sinuate inwards towards the costa. There is also a marginal series of small black dots around the apex and termen. The hindwings are light grey.
