= Stenoma striatella =

Scientific classification
- Kingdom: Animalia
- Phylum: Arthropoda
- Clade: Pancrustacea
- Class: Insecta
- Order: Lepidoptera
- Family: Depressariidae
- Genus: Stenoma
- Species: S. striatella

Binomial name
- Stenoma striatella Busck, 1914

Species of moth

Stenoma striatella is a moth in the family Depressariidae. It was described by August Busck in 1914. It is found in Panama.

The wingspan is 14–16 mm. The forewings are white with the dorsal two-thirds heavily overlaid with dark grey and sprinkled with darker blackish brown, short, longitudinal dashes, of which a few also occur in the pure white costal third. There are three short, outwardly oblique, dark brown costal streaks, one at the basal fourth, one on the middle of the costa, and one at the apical fifth. There is also a submarginal series of black streaks around the apical and terminal edge. The hindwings are dark fuscous.
