= Stenoma minor =

Scientific classification
- Kingdom: Animalia
- Phylum: Arthropoda
- Class: Insecta
- Order: Lepidoptera
- Family: Depressariidae
- Genus: Stenoma
- Species: S. minor

Binomial name
- Stenoma minor Busck, 1914

Species of moth

Stenoma minor is a moth in the family Depressariidae. It was described by August Busck in 1914. It is found in Panama.

The wingspan is about 8 mm. The forewings are dark purplish brown, with strong metallic reflections. The costal edge at the apical fourth is touched with white. The hindwings are dark brown.
