= Stenoma periaula =

Scientific classification
- Domain: Eukaryota
- Kingdom: Animalia
- Phylum: Arthropoda
- Class: Insecta
- Order: Lepidoptera
- Family: Depressariidae
- Genus: Stenoma
- Species: S. periaula

Binomial name
- Stenoma periaula Meyrick, 1916

Species of moth

Stenoma periaula is a moth of the family Depressariidae. It is found in French Guiana.

The wingspan is about 16 mm. The forewings are dark violet grey with the costal edge white throughout, more strongly towards the base. There is a hardly curved white line from the middle of the costa to before three-fourths of the dorsum and a white line with waved anterior edge running around the apex and termen, marked with a series of small black dots on the marginal edge. The hindwings are rather dark grey.
