= Stenoma metroleuca =

Scientific classification
- Domain: Eukaryota
- Kingdom: Animalia
- Phylum: Arthropoda
- Class: Insecta
- Order: Lepidoptera
- Family: Depressariidae
- Genus: Stenoma
- Species: S. metroleuca

Binomial name
- Stenoma metroleuca Meyrick, 1930

Species of moth

Stenoma metroleuca is a moth in the family Depressariidae. It was described by Edward Meyrick in 1930. It is found in Brazil (Para).

The wingspan is about 14 mm. The forewings are snow white and the hindwings are whitish, tinged grey posteriorly.
