= Stenoma eminens =

Scientific classification
- Kingdom: Animalia
- Phylum: Arthropoda
- Class: Insecta
- Order: Lepidoptera
- Family: Depressariidae
- Genus: Stenoma
- Species: S. eminens

Binomial name
- Stenoma eminens Meyrick, 1918

Species of moth

Stenoma eminens is a moth in the family Depressariidae. It was described by Edward Meyrick in 1918. It is found in French Guiana.

The wingspan is about 20 mm. The forewings are whitish grey slightly tinged violet and with the costal edge white. The stigmata are dark grey, the plical obliquely beyond the first discal. There is a very obscure cloudy somewhat dotted grey line from four-fifths of the costa to the dorsum before the tornus, curved outwards from one-fourth to four-fifths of its length. There is also a terminal series of eight small blackish dots. The hindwings are pale grey.
