= Stenoma caesia =

Scientific classification
- Domain: Eukaryota
- Kingdom: Animalia
- Phylum: Arthropoda
- Class: Insecta
- Order: Lepidoptera
- Family: Depressariidae
- Genus: Stenoma
- Species: S. caesia

Binomial name
- Stenoma caesia Meyrick, 1915

Species of moth

Stenoma caesia is a moth of the family Depressariidae. It is found in Guyana.

The wingspan is 16–18 mm. The forewings are greyish purple with the costal edge whitish ocbreous and with fine whitish-ochreous lines on the margins of the cell from base to about one-third. There is a rather broad whitish-ochreous median fascia, hardly reaching the costa, the anterior edge suffused, the posterior rather convex in the disc. There is a faint darker curved subterminal shade, preceded and followed by slightly lighter suffusion, in males, the terminal area is tinged with whitish ochreous. The hindwings are grey.
