= Stenoma bryoxyla =

Scientific classification
- Domain: Eukaryota
- Kingdom: Animalia
- Phylum: Arthropoda
- Class: Insecta
- Order: Lepidoptera
- Family: Depressariidae
- Genus: Stenoma
- Species: S. bryoxyla

Binomial name
- Stenoma bryoxyla Meyrick, 1915

Species of moth

Stenoma bryoxyla is a moth of the family Depressariidae. It is found in Peru.

The wingspan is about 19 mm. The forewings are light yellow-greenish brown, sprinkled with whitish, and with some scattered blackish scales in the disc. There is some undefined dark fuscous suffusion extending from the dorsum near the base to the disc at one-third and there are rather dark fuscous elongate marks on the costa at one-third, the middle, and two-thirds, the costal edge whitish between these. The second discal stigma is dark fuscous and there is a fine curved dentate fuscous line from the third costal mark to the dorsum before the tornus, as well as eleven dark fuscous marginal dots around the posterior part of the costa and termen, edged with more or less distinct whitish dots anteriorly. The hindwings are grey.
