= Stenoma plurima =

Scientific classification
- Domain: Eukaryota
- Kingdom: Animalia
- Phylum: Arthropoda
- Class: Insecta
- Order: Lepidoptera
- Family: Depressariidae
- Genus: Stenoma
- Species: S. plurima

Binomial name
- Stenoma plurima Walsingham, 1912

Species of moth

Stenoma plurima is a moth in the family Depressariidae. It was described by Lord Walsingham in 1912. It is found in Guatemala.

The wingspan is about 19 mm. The forewings are pale argillaceous greyish, with brownish fuscous spots and some sprinkling of brownish fuscous, especially along the dorsum and above the tornus. The first spot is at the base of the costa, and is produced in a short blunt streak along the upper edge of the cell. Beyond is a small costal spot at one-fourth, a larger spot at the middle, and another at the commencement of the costal cilia, a narrow pale line separating these from the actual margin. On the cell is an elongate spot before the middle, and a rounded spot at the end of the cell, another lying in the fold a little beyond the first, with some indication of another spot halfway between the plical and the dorsum, a dorsal spot before the tornus is also indicated; along the evenly rounded apex and termen is a series of smaller spots before the rather shining pale cinereous cilia. The hindwings are greyish fuscous.
