= Stenoma injucunda =

Scientific classification
- Domain: Eukaryota
- Kingdom: Animalia
- Phylum: Arthropoda
- Class: Insecta
- Order: Lepidoptera
- Family: Depressariidae
- Genus: Stenoma
- Species: S. injucunda

Binomial name
- Stenoma injucunda Meyrick, 1925

Species of moth

Stenoma injucunda is a moth of the family Depressariidae. It is found in Peru.

The wingspan is 18–19 mm. The forewings are light greyish ochreous, the veins suffused light fuscous and with a slightly indicated fuscous dot at the base of the fold. The stigmata are blackish, the plical obliquely beyond the first discal. There is a blackish dot towards the costa before the middle, from beyond this a series connected by fuscous shading strongly curved around the second discal stigma, indented on the fold, to the dorsum at two-thirds. A curved series of cloudy blackish dots is connected by slight fuscous suffusion from the costa at four-fifths to the dorsum before the tornus, indented beneath the costa, the apical area beyond this suffused fuscous. There is also a marginal series of black dots around the apex and termen. The hindwings are rather dark grey.
