= Stenoma affirmatella =

Scientific classification
- Domain: Eukaryota
- Kingdom: Animalia
- Phylum: Arthropoda
- Class: Insecta
- Order: Lepidoptera
- Family: Depressariidae
- Genus: Stenoma
- Species: S. affirmatella

Binomial name
- Stenoma affirmatella Busck, 1914

Species of moth

Stenoma affirmatella is a moth in the family Depressariidae. It was described by August Busck in 1914. It is found in Panama.

The wingspan is about 19 mm. The forewings appear light bluish grey, but the ground color is really dirty white, so evenly and closely overlaid with bluish fuscous scales as to give the impression of an even color to the naked eye. Three complete, broad, blackish fuscous lines run obliquely across the wing, the first from the basal fourth of the costa to the middle of the dorsum, the second from the middle of the costa to just before the tornus. These two are tolerably straight and nearly parallel. The third line runs from the apical fourth of the costa to the tornus and is outwardly curved and sinuated. There is a series of small, black, equidistant marginal dots around the apex and termen. The hindwings are light ochreous fuscous.
