= Stenoma sagax =

Scientific classification
- Kingdom: Animalia
- Phylum: Arthropoda
- Class: Insecta
- Order: Lepidoptera
- Family: Depressariidae
- Genus: Stenoma
- Species: S. sagax

Binomial name
- Stenoma sagax Busck, 1914

Species of moth

Stenoma sagax is a moth in the family Depressariidae. It was described by August Busck in 1914. It is found in Panama.

The wingspan is 22–23 mm. The forewings are light ochreous grey with the veins thinly outlined in dark lead grey and with the entire dorsal half shaded with darker grey. The edge of the wing is golden ochreous and the extreme base of the costa is black. The hindwings are light ochreous fuscous with golden edges.
