= Stenoma adoratrix =

Scientific classification
- Domain: Eukaryota
- Kingdom: Animalia
- Phylum: Arthropoda
- Class: Insecta
- Order: Lepidoptera
- Family: Depressariidae
- Genus: Stenoma
- Species: S. adoratrix

Binomial name
- Stenoma adoratrix Meyrick, 1925

Species of moth

Stenoma adoratrix is a moth of the family Depressariidae. It is found in Bolivia.

The wingspan is 25–28 mm. The forewings are light brownish ochreous or greyish ochreous, towards the costa and termen suffused whitish, the costal edge posteriorly ferruginous ochreous. There is an undefined patch of purple-brown suffusion occupying the median area of the dorsum and extending more than half across the wing. There is a round purplish spot indicating the second discal stigma and a rather thick irregular brown streak from the middle of the costa obliquely outwards to beyond this, and then rather sinuate to the dorsum at four-fifths, and a slender curved streak, tending to be broken into dots from the costa at three-fourths to the tornus, the discal veins between these streaks sometimes appearing darker shaded. There is a terminal series of small indistinct fuscous dots. The hindwings are pale ochreous yellow, towards the dorsum whitish tinged.
