= Stenoma bathrocentra =

Scientific classification
- Domain: Eukaryota
- Kingdom: Animalia
- Phylum: Arthropoda
- Class: Insecta
- Order: Lepidoptera
- Family: Depressariidae
- Genus: Stenoma
- Species: S. bathrocentra

Binomial name
- Stenoma bathrocentra Meyrick, 1915

Species of moth

Stenoma bathrocentra is a moth of the family Depressariidae. It is found in Guyana.

The wingspan is about 18 mm. The forewings are whitish ochreous tinged with brownish and with a conspicuous black basal dot in the middle. The stigmata are dark fuscous, the plical very obliquely beyond the first discal, the second discal transverse, three or four additional cloudy dots scattered along the upper margin of the cell and some fuscous suffusion beyond the second discal stigma, tending to be prolonged on the veins. A series of large cloudy dark fuscous dots is found from three-fourths of the costa to the dorsum before the tornus, very strongly curved outwards in the disc, the veins between this and the termen streaked with fuscous, suffused into a patch on the costa. There is also a marginal series of dark fuscous dots around the posterior part of the costa and termen. The hindwings are pale whitish fuscous.
