= Stenoma tolmeta =

Scientific classification
- Kingdom: Animalia
- Phylum: Arthropoda
- Clade: Pancrustacea
- Class: Insecta
- Order: Lepidoptera
- Family: Depressariidae
- Genus: Stenoma
- Species: S. tolmeta

Binomial name
- Stenoma tolmeta Walsingham, 1912

Species of moth

Stenoma tolmeta is a moth in the family Depressariidae. It was described by Lord Walsingham in 1912. It is found in Panama.

The wingspan is about 14 mm. The forewings are shining, bone white, with dull brown markings. A brown dot at the middle of the base, a broken indication of an incomplete fascia descending obliquely outward from the costa at one-fourth to the fold, a complete fascia, rather less oblique, from the costa beyond the middle to the dorsum before the tornus, and another complete fascia from costa before apex to termen above tornus, with three or four brown spots along the termen. The hindwings are very pale greyish fuscous.
