= Stenoma bisignata =

Scientific classification
- Domain: Eukaryota
- Kingdom: Animalia
- Phylum: Arthropoda
- Class: Insecta
- Order: Lepidoptera
- Family: Depressariidae
- Genus: Stenoma
- Species: S. bisignata

Binomial name
- Stenoma bisignata Meyrick, 1916

Species of moth

Stenoma bisignata is a moth of the family Depressariidae. It is found in French Guiana.

The wingspan is 23–24 mm. The forewings are whitish-lilac fuscous, with the costal edge white. The stigmata are black, the plical and first discal large and round, the plical obliquely posterior, the second discal small. There are indistinct fuscous spots on the costa at the middle and four-fifths, where cloudy irregular curved dentate fuscous lines run almost to the same point on the dorsum towards the tornus. There is a terminal series of blackish dots. The hindwings are pale greyish ochreous, the dorsal half sometimes suffused with light grey and the apex sometimes narrowly grey.
