= Stenoma adminiculata =

Scientific classification
- Domain: Eukaryota
- Kingdom: Animalia
- Phylum: Arthropoda
- Class: Insecta
- Order: Lepidoptera
- Family: Depressariidae
- Genus: Stenoma
- Species: S. adminiculata

Binomial name
- Stenoma adminiculata Meyrick, 1915

Species of moth

Stenoma adminiculata is a moth of the family Depressariidae. It is found in the Guianas.

The wingspan is 24–26 mm. The forewings are pale violet brownish with the extreme costal edge ochreous white and with a nearly straight somewhat irregular dark fuscous line from one-fourth of the costa to the dorsum beyond the middle, with a small posterior projection in the middle (representing the first discal stigma). There is a slender fusiform dark fuscous mark along the costa in the middle and there are two cloudy dark fuscous dots transversely placed on the end of the cell. A semicircular dark fuscous spot is found on the costa at four-fifths, where a faint curved fuscous line runs to the dorsum before the tornus. There is also a terminal series of dark fuscous dots. The hindwings are light ochreous yellow.
