= Stenoma trichorda =

Scientific classification
- Kingdom: Animalia
- Phylum: Arthropoda
- Class: Insecta
- Order: Lepidoptera
- Family: Depressariidae
- Genus: Stenoma
- Species: S. trichorda

Binomial name
- Stenoma trichorda Meyrick, 1912

Species of moth

Stenoma trichorda is a moth of the family Depressariidae. It is found in Colombia.

The wingspan is 35–45 mm. The forewings are fuscous, with the base of the scales whitish and the costal edge yellow whitish. There are three cloudy dark brown lines, the first almost straight, from beneath the costa at one-fourth to the middle of the dorsum, the second slightly curved, from the middle of the costa to four-fifths of the dorsum, the third moderately curved from three-fourths of the costa to the dorsum before the tornus. The second discal stigma is found on the second line and is obscurely darker. There is a series of indistinct darker dots around the apex and termen. The hindwings are light fuscous.
