= Stenoma lavata =

Scientific classification
- Domain: Eukaryota
- Kingdom: Animalia
- Phylum: Arthropoda
- Class: Insecta
- Order: Lepidoptera
- Family: Depressariidae
- Genus: Stenoma
- Species: S. lavata

Binomial name
- Stenoma lavata Walsingham, 1913

Species of moth

Stenoma lavata is a moth in the family Depressariidae. It was described by Lord Walsingham in 1913. It is found in Tabasco, Mexico.

The wingspan is about 15 mm. The forewings are very pale brownish ochreous, with the apex and termen white, two or three lines of brownish ochreous extending along the veins through the white apical space. Below the fold are two, rather oblique, dorsal patches of dark rust brown, one before, and one beyond the middle, a third lying on the upper edge of the fold nearer to the base. A small spot at two-thirds of the wing length, above the upper angle of the cell, is faintly indicated. The hindwings are yellowish grey, with a brownish fuscous costal tuft.
