= Stenoma cassigera =

Scientific classification
- Domain: Eukaryota
- Kingdom: Animalia
- Phylum: Arthropoda
- Class: Insecta
- Order: Lepidoptera
- Family: Depressariidae
- Genus: Stenoma
- Species: S. cassigera

Binomial name
- Stenoma cassigera Meyrick, 1915

Species of moth

Stenoma cassigera is a moth of the family Depressariidae. It is found in French Guiana.

The wingspan is 18–23 mm. The forewings are whitish fuscous, all veins marked with cloudy dark fuscous lines and with a straight slender dark fuscous streak from the base to one-fourth of the dorsum, and one from one-fifth of the costa to three-fourths of the dorsum. There is an irregular dark fuscous line from the costa before the middle to the middle of vein 2, with a short angular dentation outwards in the middle. A dark fuscous line is found from three-fourths of the costa, with a long acute dentation inwards beneath the costa to touch the dentation of the preceding line, then very strongly curved outwards and rejoining the preceding line at its lower extremity. There is a dark fuscous marginal line around the apex and termen. The hindwings are whitish ochreous with the apex narrowly grey.
