= Stenoma strenuella =

Scientific classification
- Kingdom: Animalia
- Phylum: Arthropoda
- Clade: Pancrustacea
- Class: Insecta
- Order: Lepidoptera
- Family: Depressariidae
- Genus: Stenoma
- Species: S. strenuella

Binomial name
- Stenoma strenuella (Walker, 1864)

Species of moth

Stenoma strenuella is a moth in the family Depressariidae. It was described by Francis Walker in 1864.
