= Stenoma fassliana =

Scientific classification
- Domain: Eukaryota
- Kingdom: Animalia
- Phylum: Arthropoda
- Class: Insecta
- Order: Lepidoptera
- Family: Depressariidae
- Genus: Stenoma
- Species: S. fassliana

Binomial name
- Stenoma fassliana (Dognin, 1913)

Synonyms
- Hilarographa fassliana Dognin, 1913

Species of moth

Stenoma fassliana is a moth in the family Depressariidae. It was described by Paul Dognin in 1913. It is found in Colombia.
