= Stenoma delphinodes =

Scientific classification
- Domain: Eukaryota
- Kingdom: Animalia
- Phylum: Arthropoda
- Class: Insecta
- Order: Lepidoptera
- Family: Depressariidae
- Genus: Stenoma
- Species: S. delphinodes

Binomial name
- Stenoma delphinodes Meyrick, 1925

Species of moth

Stenoma delphinodes is a moth of the family Depressariidae. It is found in Peru, Colombia and Panama.

The wingspan is 36–40 mm. The forewings are dark violet fuscous, lighter and browner anteriorly. The second discal stigma is small, grey whitish with a terminal series of blackish marks preceded by more or less obscure whitish suffusion. The hindwings are rather dark grey, on the basal half more blackish grey.
