= Stenoma antitacta =

Scientific classification
- Domain: Eukaryota
- Kingdom: Animalia
- Phylum: Arthropoda
- Class: Insecta
- Order: Lepidoptera
- Family: Depressariidae
- Genus: Stenoma
- Species: S. antitacta

Binomial name
- Stenoma antitacta Meyrick, 1925

Species of moth

Stenoma antitacta is a moth of the family Depressariidae. It is found in Peru.

The wingspan is about 16 mm. The forewings are whitish ochreous slightly and irregularly sprinkled light fuscous and with a small indistinct fuscous spot towards the base above the middle connected with the dorsum by a striga. The stigmata are blackish, the plical obliquely beyond the first discal. There is an inwards-oblique suffused blackish spot from the middle of the dorsum reaching to just before the plical stigma. There are triangular blackish spots on the costa at the middle and three-fourths, from the second a strongly curved waved blackish line near the termen to the tornus. There is a marginal series of blackish dots around the apical part of the costa and termen. The hindwings are ochreous whitish.
