= Stenoma iocoma =

Scientific classification
- Domain: Eukaryota
- Kingdom: Animalia
- Phylum: Arthropoda
- Class: Insecta
- Order: Lepidoptera
- Family: Depressariidae
- Genus: Stenoma
- Species: S. iocoma

Binomial name
- Stenoma iocoma Meyrick, 1915

Species of moth

Stenoma iocoma is a moth of the family Depressariidae. It is found in Guyana and French Guiana.

The wingspan is 19–22 mm. The forewings are light violet grey with the costal edge whitish ochreous and with short fine whitish-ochreous lines from the base in the middle and on the fold. There are faint hardly perceptibly darker somewhat curved transverse shades at one-third, three-fifths, and four-fifths. The hindwings are grey.
