= Stenoma subita =

Scientific classification
- Domain: Eukaryota
- Kingdom: Animalia
- Phylum: Arthropoda
- Class: Insecta
- Order: Lepidoptera
- Family: Depressariidae
- Genus: Stenoma
- Species: S. subita

Binomial name
- Stenoma subita Meyrick, 1925

Species of moth

Stenoma subita is a moth of the family Depressariidae. It is found in Bolivia.

The wingspan is about 26 mm. The forewings are dark fuscous, darkest towards the dorsum, with some ochreous-brownish suffusion in the middle of the disc and before the termen. The hindwings are white with a very broad dark fuscous terminal band occupying the posterior half of the wing throughout, the dorsum and subdorsal hairs suffused grey.
