= Stenoma cyanarcha =

Scientific classification
- Domain: Eukaryota
- Kingdom: Animalia
- Phylum: Arthropoda
- Class: Insecta
- Order: Lepidoptera
- Family: Depressariidae
- Genus: Stenoma
- Species: S. cyanarcha

Binomial name
- Stenoma cyanarcha Meyrick, 1915

Species of moth

Stenoma cyanarcha is a moth in the family Depressariidae. It was described by Edward Meyrick in 1915. It is found in Guyana.

The wingspan is about 10 mm. The forewings are dark fuscous, the basal half suffused with pale metallic green bluish and with a somewhat irregular almost straight white line from beyond the middle of the costa to two-thirds of the dorsum, rather dilated on the costa. The hindwings are dark fuscous.
