= Stenoma pardalodes =

Scientific classification
- Kingdom: Animalia
- Phylum: Arthropoda
- Class: Insecta
- Order: Lepidoptera
- Family: Depressariidae
- Genus: Stenoma
- Species: S. pardalodes

Binomial name
- Stenoma pardalodes Meyrick, 1918

Species of moth

Stenoma pardalodes is a moth in the family Depressariidae. It was described by Edward Meyrick in 1918. It is found in French Guiana.

The wingspan is about 16 mm. The forewings are brownish, irrorated dark brown and with the costal edge white and about fifteen irregular white spots, of which some of the largest are three on the costa at one-sixth, before the middle, and four-fifths, and two at the apex and tornus, the rest irregularly arranged in the disc. The hindwings are whitish, posteriorly ochreous tinged.
