= Stenoma fulcrata =

Scientific classification
- Domain: Eukaryota
- Kingdom: Animalia
- Phylum: Arthropoda
- Class: Insecta
- Order: Lepidoptera
- Family: Depressariidae
- Genus: Stenoma
- Species: S. fulcrata

Binomial name
- Stenoma fulcrata Meyrick, 1915

Species of moth

Stenoma fulcrata is a moth of the family Depressariidae. It is found in French Guiana.

The wingspan is 23–24 mm. The forewings are fuscous purple with an undefined patch of dark fuscous suffusion extending along the dorsum from near the base to beyond the middle and a straight suffused dark fuscous fascia from one-fourth of the costa to three-fourths of the dorsum. There is a small triangular dark fuscous spot on the middle of the costa and a suffused triangular dark fuscous blotch extending along the apical third of the costa, the costal edge between this and the preceding spot whitish. There is also a terminal series of elongate blackish dots. The hindwings are ochreous yellow, the dorsal two-fifths grey.
