= Stenoma cyphoxantha =

Scientific classification
- Domain: Eukaryota
- Kingdom: Animalia
- Phylum: Arthropoda
- Class: Insecta
- Order: Lepidoptera
- Family: Depressariidae
- Genus: Stenoma
- Species: S. cyphoxantha

Binomial name
- Stenoma cyphoxantha Meyrick, 1931

Species of moth

Stenoma cyphoxantha is a moth in the family Depressariidae. It was described by Edward Meyrick in 1931. It is found in French Guiana.

The wingspan is about 19 mm. The forewings are ochreous orange with the plical stigma blackish. The hindwings are light ochreous yellowish.
