= Stenoma trichocolpa =

Scientific classification
- Domain: Eukaryota
- Kingdom: Animalia
- Phylum: Arthropoda
- Class: Insecta
- Order: Lepidoptera
- Family: Depressariidae
- Genus: Stenoma
- Species: S. trichocolpa

Binomial name
- Stenoma trichocolpa Meyrick, 1915

Synonyms
- Stenoma centrodina Meyrick, 1916

Species of moth

Stenoma trichocolpa is a moth of the family Depressariidae. It is found in French Guiana.

The wingspan is about 16 mm. The forewings are light brownish ochreous, the costal edge yellow ochreous and with dark fuscous subbasal dots on the costa and in the middle. There are small dark fuscous spots on the costa at one-fourth and before and beyond the middle. The stigmata are dark fuscous, the plical obliquely beyond the first discal. There are some small scattered dark fuscous dots towards the dorsum from one-fourth to three-fourths, and between the second costal spot and the stigmata. A strongly curved series of dark fuscous dots is found from the third costal spot to the tornus, indented above the middle and there is a series of dark fuscous marginal dots around the posterior part of the costa and termen. The hindwings are grey with a fringe of very long pale greyish-ochreous hairs from vein 1a.
