= Stenoma halmas =

Scientific classification
- Kingdom: Animalia
- Phylum: Arthropoda
- Class: Insecta
- Order: Lepidoptera
- Family: Depressariidae
- Genus: Stenoma
- Species: S. halmas

Binomial name
- Stenoma halmas Meyrick, 1925

Species of moth

Stenoma halmas is a moth of the family Depressariidae. It is found in Peru.

The wingspan is about 25 mm. The forewings are light fuscous irrorated grey whitish and with the extreme costal edge yellowish except towards the base. There is some undefined fuscous suffusion on the costa at one-third, and semi-oval dark fuscous spots beyond the middle and at four-fifths. There is a blotch of brownish suffusion on the middle of the dorsum. The second discal stigma is dark fuscous and there are several indistinct darker dots in a subterminal series on the lower part of the wing. There is a marginal series of black dots around the apex and termen. The hindwings are pale ochreous yellowish, the posterior half suffused grey, the terminal edge yellowish.
