= Stenoma mundula =

Scientific classification
- Domain: Eukaryota
- Kingdom: Animalia
- Phylum: Arthropoda
- Class: Insecta
- Order: Lepidoptera
- Family: Depressariidae
- Genus: Stenoma
- Species: S. mundula

Binomial name
- Stenoma mundula Meyrick, 1916

Species of moth

Stenoma mundula is a moth of the family Depressariidae. It is found in French Guiana.

The wingspan is 16–18 mm. The forewings are pale violet grey with the costal edge yellowish white. There are three cloudy dark fuscous transverse lines, the first from one-fourth of the costa to the middle of the dorsum, the second from the middle of the costa to four-fifths of the dorsum, both almost straight. The stigmata are obscurely indicated as dots on these, the third slender and curved, from a small spot on the costa at four-fifths to the dorsum before the tornus. There is a marginal series of blackish dots around the apex and termen. The hindwings are rather dark grey.
