= Stenoma colligata =

Scientific classification
- Domain: Eukaryota
- Kingdom: Animalia
- Phylum: Arthropoda
- Class: Insecta
- Order: Lepidoptera
- Family: Depressariidae
- Genus: Stenoma
- Species: S. colligata

Binomial name
- Stenoma colligata Meyrick, 1915

Species of moth

Stenoma colligata is a moth of the family Depressariidae. It is found in Guyana.

The wingspan is about 14 mm. The forewings are grey whitish sprinkled with light grey and a few dark fuscous scales. The costal edge is ochreous white and the stigmata are cloudy and dark fuscous, the plical obliquely beyond the first discal. There is an undefined shade of scattered dark fuscous scales from beneath the costa at one-fifth to the middle of the dorsum, traversing the anterior stigmata. A similar shade is found from beneath the middle of the costa to behind the second discal stigma, then as a well-defined shade to the dorsum at two-thirds. There is a curved series of cloudy dark fuscous dots from the costa at three-fourths to the dorsum before the tornus, rather sinuate beneath the costa. A marginal series of black dots is found around the posterior part of the costa and termen. The hindwings are light grey.
