= Stenoma camarodes =

Scientific classification
- Domain: Eukaryota
- Kingdom: Animalia
- Phylum: Arthropoda
- Class: Insecta
- Order: Lepidoptera
- Family: Depressariidae
- Genus: Stenoma
- Species: S. camarodes

Binomial name
- Stenoma camarodes Meyrick, 1915

Species of moth

Stenoma camarodes is a moth of the family Depressariidae. It is found in French Guiana.

The wingspan is about 21 mm. The forewings are light brownish with the costal edge pale yellow ochreous from near the base to one-fourth and with a dark violet-grey streak from the dorsum near the base to the costa at one-fourth, continued shortly along the costa, then beneath the costa to the apex and attenuated to the middle of the term, with quadrate projections to the coastal edge before and beyond two-thirds, the coastal spaces above this ochreous yellow, above the apex with a waved edge. The second discal stigma is small, cloudy and grey. There is a curved subterminal series of small cloudy grey dots and there are some dark grey dots on the lower part of the termen. The hindwings are grey.
