= Stenoma ascodes =

Scientific classification
- Kingdom: Animalia
- Phylum: Arthropoda
- Clade: Pancrustacea
- Class: Insecta
- Order: Lepidoptera
- Family: Depressariidae
- Genus: Stenoma
- Species: S. ascodes

Binomial name
- Stenoma ascodes Meyrick, 1915

Species of moth

Stenoma ascodes is a moth of the family Depressariidae. It is found in Guyana.

The wingspan is 17–18 millimetres (0.67–0.71 in). The forewings are fuscous purple, with the costal edge deep ferruginous from near the base, more broadly posteriorly, in females with indications of three somewhat darker irregular very oblique lines running from the anterior half of the costa. The hindwings are dark grey, in males, they are clothed with hairscales in the disc and with the apical edge orange.
