= Stenoma redintegrata =

Scientific classification
- Domain: Eukaryota
- Kingdom: Animalia
- Phylum: Arthropoda
- Class: Insecta
- Order: Lepidoptera
- Family: Depressariidae
- Genus: Stenoma
- Species: S. redintegrata

Binomial name
- Stenoma redintegrata Meyrick, 1925

Species of moth

Stenoma redintegrata is a moth of the family Depressariidae. It is found in Bolivia.

The wingspan is about 17 mm. The forewings are pale fuscous, the veins marked with fine rather dark fuscous lines and with slender whitish interneural streaks edged below with fine rather dark fuscous lines closely approximated to the veins beneath them (so that there are pairs of closely adjacent dark lines). The plical and second discal stigmata are well marked and black and there is a marginal series of black dots around the apex and termen. The hindwings are pale grey, rather darker towards the apex.
