= Stenoma blandula =

Scientific classification
- Domain: Eukaryota
- Kingdom: Animalia
- Phylum: Arthropoda
- Class: Insecta
- Order: Lepidoptera
- Family: Depressariidae
- Genus: Stenoma
- Species: S. blandula

Binomial name
- Stenoma blandula Meyrick, 1915

Species of moth

Stenoma blandula is a moth of the family Depressariidae. It is found in Venezuela and Paraguay.

The wingspan is 17–18 mm. The forewings are pale yellow ochreous, slightly pinkish tinged and with a dark grey dot in the disc at one-fourth, as well as traces of a faint irregular rather oblique line of grey irroration crossing the wing beyond this. There are two dark fuscous dots transversely placed on the end of the cell and a small cloudy grey spot beneath the middle of the costa, where an indistinct series of scattered grey scales passes around the upper margin of the cell and behind these dots. A rather large cloudy dark grey spot is found on the costa at three-fourths, where a series of cloudy dark grey dots, abruptly curved above the middle, runs to the dorsum before the tornus. There is also a series of small marginal dark fuscous dots along the termen. The hindwings are yellow whitish.
