= Stenoma assignata =

Scientific classification
- Domain: Eukaryota
- Kingdom: Animalia
- Phylum: Arthropoda
- Class: Insecta
- Order: Lepidoptera
- Family: Depressariidae
- Genus: Stenoma
- Species: S. assignata

Binomial name
- Stenoma assignata Meyrick, 1918

Species of moth

Stenoma assignata is a moth in the family Depressariidae. It was described by Edward Meyrick in 1918. It is found in French Guiana.

The wingspan is about 18 mm. The forewings are pale greyish ochreous with the markings violet fuscous and a subtriangular blotch extending along the basal fifth of the costa. There is a similar blotch along the second fourth of the costa, a subdorsal dot at one-fifth, and two faint cloudy spots between this and the second costal blotch, as well as a small spot on the costa beyond the middle, where a faint line runs to the dorsum before the tornus, on the lower portion obscurely whitish edged anteriorly, the second discal stigma forms an obscurely whitish-edged dot on this line. A narrow marginal fascia runs around the posterior part of the costa and upper part of the termen, narrowed to the extremities, mixed with grey-whitish suffusion, the edge marked with darker dots. The hindwings are ochreous whitish.
