= Stenoma castellana =

Scientific classification
- Domain: Eukaryota
- Kingdom: Animalia
- Phylum: Arthropoda
- Class: Insecta
- Order: Lepidoptera
- Family: Depressariidae
- Genus: Stenoma
- Species: S. castellana

Binomial name
- Stenoma castellana Meyrick, 1916

Species of moth

Stenoma castellana is a moth of the family Depressariidae. It is found in French Guiana, South America.

The wingspan is 20–21 mm. The forewings are ochreous white with an elongate blackish-fuscous blotch running from the base of the costa to the middle of the dorsum but leaving dorsum narrowly whitish on the basal fourth, the upper edge somewhat irregular, the posterior extremity truncate, reaching the fold. There is a light fuscous trapezoidal blotch on the dorsum just beyond this, almost reaching the following. There is a very broad blackish-fuscous fascia from three-fourths of the costa to the tornus, much narrowed on the costa, the anterior edge convex-prominent in the middle and towards the costa, the posterior edge waved convex, leaving only a narrow white streak around the apical edge. The hindwings are grey, darker towards the apex, sometimes whitish tinged at the base and with the apical edge white.
