= Stenoma epicnesta =

Scientific classification
- Domain: Eukaryota
- Kingdom: Animalia
- Phylum: Arthropoda
- Class: Insecta
- Order: Lepidoptera
- Family: Depressariidae
- Genus: Stenoma
- Species: S. epicnesta

Binomial name
- Stenoma epicnesta Meyrick, 1915

Species of moth

Stenoma epicnesta is a moth of the family Depressariidae. It is found in Guyana.

The wingspan is 14–15 mm. The forewings are whitish ochreous tinged and sprinkled with fuscous and with the base white on the upper half, produced between a short streak of fuscous irroration on the fold, and a fine fuscous dash above this. There is a short very oblique irregular fuscous streak from the costa at one-fourth. The plical and first discal stigmata are suffused and fuscous, the second discal well marked and dark fuscous, surrounded with whitish. There is a suffused fuscous spot on the costa in the middle, where a very undefined shade passes behind the cell to the dorsum at three-fourths, preceded by some whitish suffusion towards the costa. A suffused triangular fuscous spot is found on the costa at three-fourths, where a strongly curved cloudy fuscous line runs very near the termen to the tornus, the terminal area beyond this is suffused with whitish and there is a marginal series of blackish dots around the posterior part of the costa and termen. The hindwings are light grey in males and grey in females.
