= Stenoma hectorea =

Scientific classification
- Kingdom: Animalia
- Phylum: Arthropoda
- Clade: Pancrustacea
- Class: Insecta
- Order: Lepidoptera
- Family: Depressariidae
- Genus: Stenoma
- Species: S. hectorea

Binomial name
- Stenoma hectorea (Meyrick, 1915)

Synonyms
- Gonioterma hectorea Meyrick, 1915

Species of moth

Stenoma hectorea is a moth in the family Depressariidae. It was described by Edward Meyrick in 1915. It is found in Peru and French Guiana.

The wingspan is 26–28 mm. The forewings are pale greyish ochreous with the costal edge yellow ochreous. There is a small brown spot on the costa beyond one-fourth and a larger one in the middle, and a rounded-triangular blotch about four-fifths. There are also brownish interrupted lines or series of cloudy dots crossing the wing from each of these, the first irregular, the second very strongly curved outwards, the third moderately curved, the disc between the second and third in some specimens suffused with light brownish. There is a dark brownish transverse mark or pair of dots on the end of the cell and a terminal series of dark fuscous dots. The hindwings are whitish ochreous.
