= Stenoma infusa =

Scientific classification
- Domain: Eukaryota
- Kingdom: Animalia
- Phylum: Arthropoda
- Class: Insecta
- Order: Lepidoptera
- Family: Depressariidae
- Genus: Stenoma
- Species: S. infusa

Binomial name
- Stenoma infusa Meyrick, 1916

Species of moth

Stenoma infusa is a moth of the family Depressariidae. It is found in French Guiana.

The wingspan is about 22 mm. The forewings are pale fuscous with the costal edge whitish yellowish and the dorsum suffused with darker on the basal fourth. There is a straight cloudy fascia of rather dark fuscous suffusion from one-fourth of the costa to the middle of the dorsum, more broadly suffused downwards and a rather small dark fuscous spot on the costa in the middle, as well as a semicircular blotch about three-fourths, where a faint cloudy darker curved line runs to the dorsum before the tornus. There is also a dark fuscous transverse dot on the end of the cell, followed by some indistinct darker irroration. A marginal row of dark fuscous dots is found around the apex and termen. The hindwings are pale ochreous yellowish, becoming deeper towards the apex.
