= Stenoma pertinax =

Scientific classification
- Domain: Eukaryota
- Kingdom: Animalia
- Phylum: Arthropoda
- Class: Insecta
- Order: Lepidoptera
- Family: Depressariidae
- Genus: Stenoma
- Species: S. pertinax

Binomial name
- Stenoma pertinax Meyrick, 1915

Species of moth

Stenoma pertinax is a moth of the family Depressariidae. It is found in Peru.

The wingspan is about 17 mm. The forewings are light ochreous with a dark purple-fuscous irregular blotch on the base of the costa, reaching nearly half across the wing. There is a dark purple-fuscous spot on the costa before the middle. The plical stigma is very small and dark fuscous, the second discal is rather large and quadrate and there is a broad rather dark purple-fuscous terminal fascia, anterior edge running from five-sixths of the costa to two-thirds of the dorsum, with a projection above the middle where a train of several indistinct dots of dark fuscous irroration runs to the costal spot, and a convex-prominent on the lower third so as to touch the second discal stigma beneath, including a suffused pale ochreous streak along the upper part of termen, and marked on the termen with five or six rather large blackish dots. The hindwings are dark fuscous.
