= Stenoma praecauta =

Scientific classification
- Domain: Eukaryota
- Kingdom: Animalia
- Phylum: Arthropoda
- Class: Insecta
- Order: Lepidoptera
- Family: Depressariidae
- Genus: Stenoma
- Species: S. praecauta

Binomial name
- Stenoma praecauta Meyrick, 1916

Species of moth

Stenoma praecauta is a moth of the family Depressariidae. It is found in French Guiana.

The wingspan is 23–26 mm. The forewings are whitish-lilac grey, with the costal edge white. The stigmata are dark grey, the plical obliquely beyond the first discal. There is a faint irregular grey line from two-thirds of the costa almost to the same point with the following. A cloudy grey waved line is found from four-fifths of the costa to the dorsum before the tornus, indented beneath the costa, then moderately curved. A marginal series of blackish dots is found around the apex and termen. The hindwings are light grey.
