= Stenoma holcadica =

Scientific classification
- Domain: Eukaryota
- Kingdom: Animalia
- Phylum: Arthropoda
- Class: Insecta
- Order: Lepidoptera
- Family: Depressariidae
- Genus: Stenoma
- Species: S. holcadica

Binomial name
- Stenoma holcadica Meyrick, 1916

Species of moth

Stenoma holcadica is a moth of the family Depressariidae. It is found in French Guiana.

The wingspan is 22–24 mm. The forewings are brownish rosy with blackish dots at the base of the costa and dorsum. The stigmata are blackish, the plical very obliquely beyond the first discal. There is a cloudy dot of dark fuscous irroration above and slightly beyond the first discal, and traces of an irregular line through the plical to the dorsum. A blotch of dark grey suffusion is found on the costa beyond the middle, giving rise to two series of black dots, the first irregularly sinuate curved behind the cell and becoming obsolete towards the dorsum and the second very strongly curved to four-fifths of the dorsum. A marginal series of blackish dots is found around the apex and termen. The hindwings are grey.
