= Stenoma sexmaculata =

Scientific classification
- Kingdom: Animalia
- Phylum: Arthropoda
- Class: Insecta
- Order: Lepidoptera
- Family: Depressariidae
- Genus: Stenoma
- Species: S. sexmaculata

Binomial name
- Stenoma sexmaculata (Dognin, 1904)

Synonyms
- Cryptolechia sexmaculata Dognin, 1904

Species of moth in the family Depressariidae

Stenoma sexmaculata is a moth in the family Depressariidae. It was described by Paul Dognin in 1904. It is found in Ecuador.
