= Stenoma vexata =

Scientific classification
- Domain: Eukaryota
- Kingdom: Animalia
- Phylum: Arthropoda
- Class: Insecta
- Order: Lepidoptera
- Family: Depressariidae
- Genus: Stenoma
- Species: S. vexata

Binomial name
- Stenoma vexata Meyrick, 1915

Species of moth

Stenoma vexata is a moth of the family Depressariidae. It is found in Guyana.

The wingspan is 17–18 mm. The forewings are dark purple fuscous with a pale ochreous dash on the base of the fold, and a shorter mark from the base above it. The costal and discal area from one-fifth are irregularly marked with short slender pale ochreous longitudinal marks and the dorsal scale-projection at one-fourth is pale ochreous. The plical and second discal stigmata are cloudy and blackish and there is an irregular cloudy pale ochreous line from three-fourths of the costa to the termen beneath the apex. There are five or six dark fuscous dots on the termen, more or less surrounded irregularly with pale ochreous. The hindwings are dark grey.
