= Stenoma bythitis =

Scientific classification
- Domain: Eukaryota
- Kingdom: Animalia
- Phylum: Arthropoda
- Class: Insecta
- Order: Lepidoptera
- Family: Depressariidae
- Genus: Stenoma
- Species: S. bythitis

Binomial name
- Stenoma bythitis Meyrick, 1915

Species of moth

Stenoma bythitis is a moth of the family Depressariidae. It is found in French Guiana and Guyana.

The wingspan is 17–18 mm. The forewings are dark bluish-slaty fuscous with the markings deep purple bronze. There is a spot on the costa before the middle, where a very oblique curved series of small cloudy spots accompanied by minute irregular white dots runs around the end of the cell, and a similar suffused spot with a few white scales is found on the fold beneath the middle of the wing. There is a strongly curved series of small spots accompanied by minute white dots from the costa beyond the middle to the tornus and a suffused streak around the posterior part of the costa and apex. There is also a terminal series of small irregular white dots, partially indistinct. The hindwings are blackish.
