= Stenoma fenestra =

Scientific classification
- Kingdom: Animalia
- Phylum: Arthropoda
- Class: Insecta
- Order: Lepidoptera
- Family: Depressariidae
- Genus: Stenoma
- Species: S. fenestra

Binomial name
- Stenoma fenestra Busck, 1914

Species of moth

Stenoma fenestra is a moth in the family Depressariidae. It was described by August Busck in 1914. It is found in Panama.

The wingspan is about 22 mm. The forewings are dark violaceous brown with a round lemon yellow spot on the costal edge near the base, followed by a large reddish-yellow spot, edged by dark velvety brown scales. There is a small yellow dot within the middle of the dorsal edge, and some diffused reddish and dark-brown streaks on the cell. Two indistinct and suffused, whitish, zigzag lines are found across the wing at the apical third and the extreme costal edge, a small spot at the apical third of the costa and the extreme apex are all light yellow. The hindwings are dark fuscous.
