= Stenoma paropta =

Scientific classification
- Domain: Eukaryota
- Kingdom: Animalia
- Phylum: Arthropoda
- Class: Insecta
- Order: Lepidoptera
- Family: Depressariidae
- Genus: Stenoma
- Species: S. paropta

Binomial name
- Stenoma paropta Meyrick, 1916

Species of moth

Stenoma paropta is a moth of the family Depressariidae. It is found in the French Guiana.

The wingspan is 18–19 mm. The forewings are light ochreous yellow, the dorsal three-fifths, except towards the base, suffused with pale rosy-brownish, the costa greenish yellow. The hindwings are whitish yellowish, in females very faintly greyish tinged on the dorsal half.
