= Stenoma orthocapna =

Scientific classification
- Kingdom: Animalia
- Phylum: Arthropoda
- Class: Insecta
- Order: Lepidoptera
- Family: Depressariidae
- Genus: Stenoma
- Species: S. orthocapna

Binomial name
- Stenoma orthocapna Meyrick, 1912

Species of moth

Stenoma orthocapna is a moth of the family Depressariidae. It is found in French Guiana and Guyana.

The wingspan is 30–31 mm. The forewings are rather light glossy lilac fuscous with a suffused blackish-fuscous longitudinal median streak from the base to the apex, the second discal stigma appearing as a dark fuscous dot on its lower edge, the costal area above this streak somewhat lighter. There are faint dorsal spots of darker suffusion beyond the middle and before the tornus, and a faint curved transverse line before the termen. There are also indistinct darker dots along the termen. The hindwings are rather dark fuscous.
