= Stenoma anetodes =

Scientific classification
- Domain: Eukaryota
- Kingdom: Animalia
- Phylum: Arthropoda
- Class: Insecta
- Order: Lepidoptera
- Family: Depressariidae
- Genus: Stenoma
- Species: S. anetodes

Binomial name
- Stenoma anetodes Meyrick, 1915

Species of moth

Stenoma anetodes is a moth of the family Depressariidae. It is found in Guyana.

The wingspan is 20–21 mm. The forewings are pale greyish ochreous, slightly sprinkled with fuscous, the veins posteriorly marked with indistinct fuscous lines and with a streak of dark fuscous suffusion from the base of the costa to one-fourth of the dorsum. The stigmata are blackish, the plical and first discal very small, the plical obliquely posterior, the second discal transverse-linear. There is a small cloudy dark fuscous transverse spot on the costa at two-fifths, and three cloudy dark fuscous marks between this and the second discal stigma. A cloudy dentate dark fuscous line is found from a spot on the costa beyond the middle very obliquely outwards to beyond the cell, then abruptly angulated and continued less marked, irregularly dentate, to the dorsum about two-thirds. There is an interrupted waved dark fuscous line or series of marks from the costa at three-fourths sinuate-oblique to the opposite apex, then angulated and continued parallel to the termen to the dorsum before the tornus, followed on the costa by a patch of dark fuscous suffusion. There is a series of dark fuscous marginal dots around the costa posteriorly and the termen. The hindwings are pale grey.
