= Stenoma hemilampra =

Scientific classification
- Kingdom: Animalia
- Phylum: Arthropoda
- Class: Insecta
- Order: Lepidoptera
- Family: Depressariidae
- Genus: Stenoma
- Species: S. hemilampra

Binomial name
- Stenoma hemilampra Meyrick, 1915

Species of moth

Stenoma hemilampra is a moth of the family Depressariidae. It is found in French Guiana.

The wingspan is 30–34 mm for males and about 40 mm for females. The forewings are violet fuscous, with a whitish gloss, the costa suffused with dark fuscous. There is an indistinct pale cloudy straight line, edged posteriorly with darker, from one-third of the costa to the middle of the dorsum. A strong black transverse mark is found on the end of the cell and there is a pale cloudy straight line, edged anteriorly with darker, from five-sixths of the costa to the tornus and there is a terminal series of black dots. The hindwings are grey, the apical half ochreous orange.
