= Stenoma vasifera =

Scientific classification
- Domain: Eukaryota
- Kingdom: Animalia
- Phylum: Arthropoda
- Class: Insecta
- Order: Lepidoptera
- Family: Depressariidae
- Genus: Stenoma
- Species: S. vasifera

Binomial name
- Stenoma vasifera Meyrick, 1925

Synonyms
- Stenoma unisignis Meyrick, 1932

Species of moth

Stenoma vasifera is a moth of the family Depressariidae. It is found in Colombia and Bolivia.

The wingspan is about 27 mm. The forewings are light ochreous fuscous, becoming more ochreous tinged posteriorly, a subcostal spot of ochreous suffusion at the base. There is a triangular dark fuscous spot with rounded apex on the middle of the costa. The second discal stigma forms a small transverse linear fuscous mark and there is a slight dark brown mark from the costa about two-thirds, where a rather strongly curved series of small indistinct dots runs to near dorsum at four-fifths. The dorsal edge is tinged brown except towards the extremities. The hindwings are grey closely irrorated dark grey.
