= Stenoma porphyrastis =

Scientific classification
- Domain: Eukaryota
- Kingdom: Animalia
- Phylum: Arthropoda
- Class: Insecta
- Order: Lepidoptera
- Family: Depressariidae
- Genus: Stenoma
- Species: S. porphyrastis

Binomial name
- Stenoma porphyrastis Meyrick, 1915

Species of moth

Stenoma porphyrastis is a moth of the family Depressariidae. It is found in Guyana and French Guiana.

The wingspan is 21–22 mm. The forewings are light brown with the markings suffused, deep purple. There is an elongate blotch along the costa from the base to near one-third, extended at the base to the dorsum, from its apex sending a transverse shade to the middle of the next fascia. There is an irregular fascia from the middle of the costa to two-fifths of the dorsum, extended as an irregular blotch along the dorsum to the tornus. A transverse spot is found on the end of the cell, resting on this blotch and there is an irregular curved subterminal fascia from three-fourths of the costa to the tornus, the posterior margin suffused into the termen or connected with it by suffused streaks on the veins. There is also a terminal series of small dark fuscous dots. The hindwings are grey, darker posteriorly.
