= Stenoma immersa =

Scientific classification
- Domain: Eukaryota
- Kingdom: Animalia
- Phylum: Arthropoda
- Class: Insecta
- Order: Lepidoptera
- Family: Depressariidae
- Genus: Stenoma
- Species: S. immersa

Binomial name
- Stenoma immersa Walsingham, 1913

Species of moth

Stenoma immersa is a moth in the family Depressariidae. It was described by Lord Walsingham in 1913. It is found in Mexico (Guerrero).

The wingspan is about 21 mm. The forewings are brownish ochreous, partly suffused with purplish grey. The first suffusion touches the flexus, is diffused outwards along the cell, branches narrowly to the costa at one-third, and is somewhat intensified on the dorsum at the same distance from the base. The second suffusion, faintly connected with the first above the middle, leaves the costa a little beyond the middle and fading out at the end of the cell, where there is a small round spot, reappears below this and is diffused downward to the dorsum and tornus, whence arises an indistinct, outwardly curved, series of small purplish grey spots reverting to the costa after forming a slight angle below it. The hindwings are brownish grey.
