= Stenoma ochlodes =

Scientific classification
- Domain: Eukaryota
- Kingdom: Animalia
- Phylum: Arthropoda
- Class: Insecta
- Order: Lepidoptera
- Family: Depressariidae
- Genus: Stenoma
- Species: S. ochlodes

Binomial name
- Stenoma ochlodes Walsingham, 1912

Species of moth

Stenoma ochlodes is a moth in the family Depressariidae. It was described by Lord Walsingham in 1912. It is found in Panama.

The wingspan is about 15 mm. The forewings are rather shining, bone whitish, with a dark fuscous dot at the extreme base of the fold, a broken, irregular, narrow, oblique brownish transverse fascia from the costa at one-fourth to the middle of the dorsum, throwing a slight angle outward on the cell, and somewhat mixed with fuscous scales, especially at its extremities. This is succeeded by another fascia from the costa a little beyond the middle, produced obliquely outward in a rather zigzag line to the upper angle of the cell, below which it helps to form a semidetached spot within the end of the cell, thence curving outward to the tornus, where it intersects an outwardly curved series of about ten dark fuscous spots, preceding the similarly spotted termen. The two series of spots converge on the costa and before the tornus, but the pale space between them is wider toward the apex than below it. The hindwings are pale bone grey.
