= Stenoma dispilella =

Scientific classification
- Kingdom: Animalia
- Phylum: Arthropoda
- Class: Insecta
- Order: Lepidoptera
- Family: Depressariidae
- Genus: Stenoma
- Species: S. dispilella

Binomial name
- Stenoma dispilella (Walker, 1866)

Synonyms
- Cryptolechia dispilella Walker, 1866

Species of moth

Stenoma dispilella is a moth in the family Depressariidae. It was described by Francis Walker in 1866. It is found in Colombia.

The wingspan is 29–30 mm. Adults are very pale fawn colour above and pale ochraceous cinereous beneath. The forewings are rectangular at the tips. There are five black points on the antemedial disc and a blackish brown pear-shaped pale-bordered spot in the disc beyond the middle. There is a more exterior large spot, which is slightly paler than the ground hue and is bordered on the outer side by a pale brown blackish pointed line. The marginal points are black and the exterior border is slightly rounded and oblique. The hindwings are whitish cinereous.
