= Stenoma ancylacma =

Scientific classification
- Domain: Eukaryota
- Kingdom: Animalia
- Phylum: Arthropoda
- Class: Insecta
- Order: Lepidoptera
- Family: Depressariidae
- Genus: Stenoma
- Species: S. ancylacma

Binomial name
- Stenoma ancylacma Meyrick, 1925

Species of moth

Stenoma ancylacma is a species of moth of the family Depressariidae. It is found in Peru.

The wingspan is about 24 mm. The forewings are white, the dorsal half suffused pale ochreous and sprinkled fuscous posteriorly, the costal edge tinged pale ochreous. There is a blackish blotch occupying the basal third of the dorsum and extending gradually and irregularly narrower to the base of the costa. The plical stigma is blackish and there is a triangular brown patch resting on the termen from near the apex to the tornus and its apex reaching in the disc to the end of the cell, the upper part yellow brown and edged posteriorly with some dark fuscous scales and anteriorly with a semi-oval blackish spot, preceding its apex a dark fuscous dot in the disc. There are three or four indistinct dots of dark fuscous irroration just beneath the costa towards the apex. The hindwings are ochreous whitish with a short dark grey almost marginal streak around the apex.
