= Stenoma sustentata =

Scientific classification
- Kingdom: Animalia
- Phylum: Arthropoda
- Class: Insecta
- Order: Lepidoptera
- Family: Depressariidae
- Genus: Stenoma
- Species: S. sustentata

Binomial name
- Stenoma sustentata Meyrick, 1925

Species of moth

Stenoma sustentata is a moth of the family Depressariidae. It is found in Colombia.

The wingspan is about 26 mm. The forewings are light brownish ochreous with the markings rather dark violet fuscous. There is a suffused streak from the base of the costa to the middle of the dorsum, where it runs into an irregular suffused fascia from the apex widening downwards and covering the posterior half of the dorsum, leaving a narrow suffused terminal streak of ground colour. There is also a terminal series of dark dots and a small suffused spot beneath the costal edge in the middle, where an oblique series of two or three cloudy dots runs to the middle of the posterior fascia. The hindwings are dark grey.
