= Stenoma balanoptis =

Scientific classification
- Kingdom: Animalia
- Phylum: Arthropoda
- Class: Insecta
- Order: Lepidoptera
- Family: Depressariidae
- Genus: Stenoma
- Species: S. balanoptis

Binomial name
- Stenoma balanoptis Meyrick, 1932

Species of moth

Stenoma balanoptis is a moth in the family Depressariidae. It was described by Edward Meyrick in 1932. It is found in Peru.
