= Stenoma paracapna =

Scientific classification
- Domain: Eukaryota
- Kingdom: Animalia
- Phylum: Arthropoda
- Class: Insecta
- Order: Lepidoptera
- Family: Depressariidae
- Genus: Stenoma
- Species: S. paracapna

Binomial name
- Stenoma paracapna Meyrick, 1915

Species of moth

Stenoma paracapna is a moth of the family Depressariidae. It is found in Guyana.

The wingspan is about 15 mm. The forewings are fuscous, the costa suffused with dark ashy grey tinged with purple, more broadly towards the base, more or less interrupted at one-fourth and three-fifths, sometimes spotted with blackish posteriorly. The discal stigmata are indistinct and dark grey, the plical hardly marked, very obliquely beyond the first discal. From the costal suffusion at three-fifths, a very strongly curved series of dark grey or blackish dots runs to the tornus and there is an indistinct interrupted dark grey terminal line. The hindwings are dark grey, strewn with blackish hairscales.
