= Stenoma chalybaeella =

Scientific classification
- Kingdom: Animalia
- Phylum: Arthropoda
- Class: Insecta
- Order: Lepidoptera
- Family: Depressariidae
- Genus: Stenoma
- Species: S. chalybaeella

Binomial name
- Stenoma chalybaeella (Walker, 1864)

Synonyms
- Cryptolechia chalybaeella Walker, 1864

Species of moth

Stenoma chalybaeella is a moth of the family Depressariidae. It is found in Amazonas, Brazil.

Adults are cupreous brown with broad wings, the forewings slightly rounded at the tips, tinged with chalybeous and with a transverse ferruginous streak in the disc at two-thirds of the length. There is a ferruginous marginal line, dilated towards the costa and a short black more or less distinct longitudinal streak in the disc before the middle. The exterior border is convex and not oblique. The hindwings are cupreous with a dark cinereous fringe.
