= Stenoma leucaniella =

Scientific classification
- Kingdom: Animalia
- Phylum: Arthropoda
- Class: Insecta
- Order: Lepidoptera
- Family: Depressariidae
- Genus: Stenoma
- Species: S. leucaniella

Binomial name
- Stenoma leucaniella (Walker, 1864)

Synonyms
- Cryptolechia leucaniella Walker, 1864

Species of moth

Stenoma leucaniella is a moth of the family Depressariidae. It is found in Venezuela.

Adults are whitish, with a very slight aeneous tinge and with broad wings. The forewings are acutely rectangular at the tips, with two brown points in the disc, one before the middle, the other beyond the middle. There is a third brown point between the first and the second, but nearer the interior border. The marginal points are blackish and the costa is slightly convex towards the base, while the exterior border is straight and not oblique, except towards the interior border.
