= Stenoma scoriodes =

Scientific classification
- Kingdom: Animalia
- Phylum: Arthropoda
- Class: Insecta
- Order: Lepidoptera
- Family: Depressariidae
- Genus: Stenoma
- Species: S. scoriodes

Binomial name
- Stenoma scoriodes (Meyrick, 1915)

Synonyms
- Orphnolechia scoriodes Meyrick, 1915; Stenoma avida Meyrick, 1915

Species of moth

Stenoma scoriodes is a moth of the family Depressariidae. It is found in French Guiana and Guyana.

The wingspan is 13–16 mm. The forewings are whitish, irregularly irrorated with dark fuscous and with an angulated series of small irregular dark fuscous spots crossing the wing about one-third. There is a narrow elongate or semi-oval dark fuscous blotch on the middle of the costa and a transverse dark fuscous mark on the end of the cell, as well as an irregular spot of dark fuscous suffusion on the dorsum towards the tornus. A dark fuscous costal spot is found about two-thirds, where a strongly curved line of small subcontinent dark fuscous spots runs to the tornus and there is a series of small semi-oval dark fuscous spots around the posterior part of the costa and termen. The hindwings are pale grey.
