= Stenoma discrepans =

Scientific classification
- Domain: Eukaryota
- Kingdom: Animalia
- Phylum: Arthropoda
- Class: Insecta
- Order: Lepidoptera
- Family: Depressariidae
- Genus: Stenoma
- Species: S. discrepans

Binomial name
- Stenoma discrepans Meyrick, 1925

Species of moth

Stenoma discrepans is a moth of the family Depressariidae. It is found in Peru.

The wingspan is about 22 mm. The forewings are whitish yellowish, beyond an irregular line from one-fourth of the dorsum to the costa near the apex light grey, the division suffused. The plical and second discal stigmata are minute and black. There is a semi-oval black spot on the middle of the costa and there is a very small black spot on the costa at four-fifths, where a slightly curved series of faint grey dots runs to the tornus and there is a terminal series of small black dots. The hindwings are light grey.
