= Stenoma sinuata =

Scientific classification
- Domain: Eukaryota
- Kingdom: Animalia
- Phylum: Arthropoda
- Class: Insecta
- Order: Lepidoptera
- Family: Depressariidae
- Genus: Stenoma
- Species: S. sinuata

Binomial name
- Stenoma sinuata (Fabricius, 1798)

Synonyms
- sinuata Fabricius, 1798; dentella Fabricius, 1794 (preocc.)

Species of moth

Stenoma sinuata is a moth in the family Depressariidae. It was described by Johan Christian Fabricius in 1798. It is found on the West Indies.
