= Stenoma rhodocolpa =

Scientific classification
- Domain: Eukaryota
- Kingdom: Animalia
- Phylum: Arthropoda
- Class: Insecta
- Order: Lepidoptera
- Family: Depressariidae
- Genus: Stenoma
- Species: S. rhodocolpa

Binomial name
- Stenoma rhodocolpa Meyrick, 1916

Synonyms
- Stenoma orthroptila Meyrick, 1936

Species of moth

Stenoma rhodocolpa is a moth of the family Depressariidae. It is found in French Guiana and Peru.

The wingspan is about 23 mm. The forewings are pale ochreous yellowish and the costal and terminal edge are pale pink. There is a blackish blotch running from the base of the costa to the dorsum at two-fifths, but leaving the dorsum narrowly pale yellowish on the basal fourth, the posterior extremity truncate, the reaching the fold. The dorsal area is faintly fuscous tinged beyond this with a broad purple-blackish fascia from two-thirds of the costa to the tornus, abruptly narrowed on the costa but otherwise of nearly even width, the anterior edge prominent in the middle and towards the costa, leaving a moderately broad triangular apical patch of ground colour. The hindwings are grey, with the costa somewhat sinuate towards three-fourths, with a patch of longer rosy-pink cilia before the sinuation.
