= Stenoma negotiosa =

Scientific classification
- Domain: Eukaryota
- Kingdom: Animalia
- Phylum: Arthropoda
- Class: Insecta
- Order: Lepidoptera
- Family: Depressariidae
- Genus: Stenoma
- Species: S. negotiosa

Binomial name
- Stenoma negotiosa Meyrick, 1925

Species of moth

Stenoma negotiosa is a moth of the family Depressariidae. It is found in Amazonas, Brazil.

The wingspan is about 30 mm. The forewings are light greyish violet, with a slight ochreous tinge. The extreme costal edge is whitish from one-fifth to two-thirds. There are three triangular purplish costal spots, the first at one-fourth, very small, the second median, small, the third about four-fifths, large. The stigmata are cloudy, purplish, the plical obliquely beyond the first discal, beneath the second discal a small cloudy spot on the fold. There is a rather curved transverse series of faint cloudy purplish dots beyond the second discal and there is an irregularly curved series of faint greyish dots from the third costal spot to before the tornus. There is also a terminal series of dark fuscous dots. The hindwings are grey.
