= Stenoma muscula =

Scientific classification
- Domain: Eukaryota
- Kingdom: Animalia
- Phylum: Arthropoda
- Class: Insecta
- Order: Lepidoptera
- Family: Depressariidae
- Genus: Stenoma
- Species: S. muscula

Binomial name
- Stenoma muscula Meyrick, 1925

Synonyms
- Cryptolechia muscula Zeller, 1877; Stenoma sciocnesta Meyrick, 1925

Species of moth

Stenoma muscula is a moth of the family Depressariidae. It is found in Panama and Brazil (Amazonas).

Its wingspan is 13–14 mm. The forewings are pale ochreous grey irregularly sprinkled dark grey. The stigmata are dark fuscous, the plical obliquely beyond the first discal. There are cloudy spots of grey suffusion on the costa at one-third, beyond the middle, and four-fifths, from the third a strongly curved series of cloudy dark grey subconfluent dots to the tornus. The hindwings are grey.
