= Stenoma deuteropa =

Scientific classification
- Kingdom: Animalia
- Phylum: Arthropoda
- Clade: Pancrustacea
- Class: Insecta
- Order: Lepidoptera
- Family: Depressariidae
- Genus: Stenoma
- Species: S. deuteropa

Binomial name
- Stenoma deuteropa Meyrick, 1931

Species of moth

Stenoma deuteropa is a moth in the family Depressariidae. It was described by Edward Meyrick in 1931. It is found in Paraguay.
