= Stenoma embythia =

Scientific classification
- Domain: Eukaryota
- Kingdom: Animalia
- Phylum: Arthropoda
- Class: Insecta
- Order: Lepidoptera
- Family: Depressariidae
- Genus: Stenoma
- Species: S. embythia

Binomial name
- Stenoma embythia Meyrick, 1916

Species of moth

Stenoma embythia is a moth of the family Depressariidae. It is found in French Guiana.

The wingspan is 13–14 mm. The forewings are dark bronzy fuscous with the dorsal area broadly suffused with purple and irrorated with violet whitish, its edge very irregular, appearing to form two anterior and two posterior irregular lobes reaching about half across the wing. There is an obscure darker spot on the end of the cell and a marginal row of minute white dots around the apex and termen. The hindwings are rather dark grey.
