= Stenoma sublimbata =

Scientific classification
- Kingdom: Animalia
- Phylum: Arthropoda
- Clade: Pancrustacea
- Class: Insecta
- Order: Lepidoptera
- Family: Depressariidae
- Genus: Stenoma
- Species: S. sublimbata

Binomial name
- Stenoma sublimbata (Zeller, 1877)

Synonyms
- Antaeotricha sublimbata Zeller, 1877

Species of moth

Stenoma sublimbata is a moth of the family Depressariidae. It is found in Panama, Colombia, Peru and Bolivia.

The wingspan is about 28 mm. The forewings are pale yellow ochreous, with a violet gloss, the dorsal half and terminal area tinged violet grey. There is some narrow violet-grey suffusion along the costa except on a patch about three-fourths, and leaving the costal edge pale yellowish throughout a dark brown irregular-edged blotch occupying the basal third of the dorsum. There are two small round dark brown spots transversely placed on the end of the cell, a larger reniform spot beyond the upper of these, and a still larger subtriangular spot extending from beyond the lower to near the dorsum. The hindwings are ochreous whitish with a narrow grey marginal streak around the posterior two-thirds of the costa and upper part of the termen, narrowed and obsolescent downwards.
