= Stenoma aterpes =

Scientific classification
- Domain: Eukaryota
- Kingdom: Animalia
- Phylum: Arthropoda
- Class: Insecta
- Order: Lepidoptera
- Family: Depressariidae
- Genus: Stenoma
- Species: S. aterpes

Binomial name
- Stenoma aterpes Walsingham, 1913

Species of moth

Stenoma aterpes is a moth in the family Depressariidae. It was described by Lord Walsingham in 1913. It is found in Veracruz, Mexico.

The wingspan is about 32 mm. The forewings are fawn grey, with a slight tawny gloss. Two small fuscous spots, one at the end of the cell, preceded by a diffused streak of rather paler fawn, which is repeated along the base of the costa; a second in the fold, rather beyond its middle, surrounded by the same paler fawn colour. A faintly darker shade of tawny fawn grey crosses the wing, leaving the costa at two-thirds, obtusely angulated outward opposite to the middle of the termen and reverting to the dorsum before the tornus. The hindwings are dark brownish grey.
