= Stenoma thylacandra =

Scientific classification
- Domain: Eukaryota
- Kingdom: Animalia
- Phylum: Arthropoda
- Class: Insecta
- Order: Lepidoptera
- Family: Depressariidae
- Genus: Stenoma
- Species: S. thylacandra

Binomial name
- Stenoma thylacandra Meyrick, 1915

Species of moth

Stenoma thylacandra is a moth of the family Depressariidae. It is found in French Guiana.

The wingspan is about 32 mm. The forewings are pale whitish fuscous with the costal edge whitish. The plical and second discal stigmata are small and dark fuscous, the plical touching the edge of the costal fold. There is a faint cloudy line of fuscous irroration from beyond the middle of the costa to three-fifths of the dorsum, strongly curved outwards in the disc. A series of cloudy fuscous lunulate dots is found from beyond three-fourths of the costa to the dorsum before the tornus, curved outwards in the disc. There is a series of dark fuscous marginal dots around the termen, and two less distinct on the costa. The hindwings are ochreous whitish.
