= Stenoma elaeurga =

Scientific classification
- Domain: Eukaryota
- Kingdom: Animalia
- Phylum: Arthropoda
- Class: Insecta
- Order: Lepidoptera
- Family: Depressariidae
- Genus: Stenoma
- Species: S. elaeurga

Binomial name
- Stenoma elaeurga Meyrick, 1925

Species of moth

Stenoma elaeurga is a moth of the family Depressariidae. It is a species native in Bolivia.

Its wingspan is about 23 mm, where the forewings are light greyish in color, ochreous, irregularly sprinkled olive fuscous, especially towards the base, on an oblique fascia before the middle, and beyond the subterminal line.

The plical and first discal stigmata are obscurely darker, but the second discal is dark fuscous and distinct. There are three or four dots of dark olive-fuscous irroration towards the costa before the middle, a strongly excurved series of very undefined dots from beneath the costa before the middle, around the second discal stigma to the middle of the dorsum. And a strongly angulated subterminal series of cloudy dots from the costa before two-thirds, to the dorsum towards the tornus.

There is also a marginal series of dark fuscous dots around the apex and termen. The hindwings are grey.
