= Stenoma externella =

Scientific classification
- Kingdom: Animalia
- Phylum: Arthropoda
- Class: Insecta
- Order: Lepidoptera
- Family: Depressariidae
- Genus: Stenoma
- Species: S. externella

Binomial name
- Stenoma externella (Walker, 1864)

Synonyms
- Cryptolechia externella Walker, 1864; Cryptolechia megaspilella Walker, 1864; Stenoma aggerata Meyrick, 1915

Species of moth

Stenoma externella is a moth of the family Depressariidae. It is found in Brazil (Amazonas) and Guyana.

The wingspan is about 17 mm. The forewings are pale yellow ochreous with a dark fuscous dorsal blotch extending from the base to the middle and reaching three-fourths across the wing, posteriorly obliquely rounded. There is a fascia-like patch of fuscous suffusion from beyond the cell to the dorsum before the tornus and a narrow terminal interrupted fascia of fuscous suffusion, leaving a terminal edge of ground colour. The hindwings are grey.
