= Stenoma epicta =

Scientific classification
- Domain: Eukaryota
- Kingdom: Animalia
- Phylum: Arthropoda
- Class: Insecta
- Order: Lepidoptera
- Family: Depressariidae
- Genus: Stenoma
- Species: S. epicta

Binomial name
- Stenoma epicta Walsingham, 1912

Species of moth

Stenoma epicta is a moth in the family Depressariidae. It was described by Lord Walsingham in 1912. It is found in Tabasco, Mexico.

The wingspan is about 14 mm. The forewings are rather shining, white, with pale grey shading, a strong brown patch near the base of the dorsum, and a dark brown spot at the end of the cell. The pale olivaceous grey shading consists of a broad band along the dorsum, crossing the outer end of the fold, curved upward around the end of the cell, and attenuate backward to the costa, at two-thirds from the base, a costal shade, commencing at the base, extending to one-third and thence deflected obliquely outward to the fold, and an apical shade extending from the costa along the termen nearly to the tornus, and covering the cilia, the curved white transverse band which separates it from the antecedent grey shade being clearly defined. The hindwings are pale greyish.
