= Stenoma citroxantha =

Scientific classification
- Domain: Eukaryota
- Kingdom: Animalia
- Phylum: Arthropoda
- Class: Insecta
- Order: Lepidoptera
- Family: Depressariidae
- Genus: Stenoma
- Species: S. citroxantha

Binomial name
- Stenoma citroxantha Meyrick, 1916

Species of moth

Stenoma citroxantha is a moth of the family Depressariidae. It is found in French Guiana.

The wingspan is about 17 mm. The forewings are light grey with the extreme costal edge white except on the basal fourth and with a violet-grey streak along the basal fourth of the costa, as well as two small whitish-yellow basal spots above and below the middle. Beyond these is a transverse series of three deep yellow streaks and one spot, separated by pale violet-grey streaks, the second yellow streak longest. The costal area beyond this is whitish yellow, marked with two dark grey spots, and terminated by an elongate dark grey blotch about two-thirds. There is a large blackish patch extending over the median third of the wing except the costal area and the posterior area is grey marked with obscure darker longitudinal streaks, and cut by a paler curved subterminal shade tinged with whitish yellowish towards the costa. The hindwings are light grey.
