= Stenoma nigricans =

Scientific classification
- Kingdom: Animalia
- Phylum: Arthropoda
- Clade: Pancrustacea
- Class: Insecta
- Order: Lepidoptera
- Family: Depressariidae
- Genus: Stenoma
- Species: S. nigricans

Binomial name
- Stenoma nigricans (Busck, 1914)

Synonyms
- Athleta nigricans Busck, 1914

Species of moth

Stenoma nigricans is a moth in the family Depressariidae. It was described by August Busck in 1914. It is found in Panama.

The wingspan is about 12 mm. The forewings are dark brownish fuscous with the terminal edge silvery white and the extreme base of the costa and apical two-thirds of the costal edge also silvery white. The hindwings are dark fuscous.
