= Stenoma litura =

Scientific classification
- Kingdom: Animalia
- Phylum: Arthropoda
- Clade: Pancrustacea
- Class: Insecta
- Order: Lepidoptera
- Family: Depressariidae
- Genus: Stenoma
- Species: S. litura

Binomial name
- Stenoma litura Zeller, 1839

Species of moth

Stenoma litura is a moth in the family Depressariidae. It was described by Philipp Christoph Zeller in 1839. It is found in South America.

Stenoma litura is the type species of the genus Stenoma. It was described on the basis of a single female now in the British Museum.
