= Stenoma platyphylla =

Scientific classification
- Domain: Eukaryota
- Kingdom: Animalia
- Phylum: Arthropoda
- Class: Insecta
- Order: Lepidoptera
- Family: Depressariidae
- Genus: Stenoma
- Species: S. platyphylla

Binomial name
- Stenoma platyphylla Meyrick, 1916

Species of moth

Stenoma platyphylla is a moth of the family Depressariidae. It is found in French Guiana. The wingspan is 17–18 mm. The forewings are brown, indistinctly and suffusedly streaked with darker and with a large green patch extending along the dorsum from the base to three-fourths and reaching more than half across the wing, edged above by a dark fuscous streak from the base to one-third of the wing. The hindwings are grey with the apical edge whitish ochreous.
