= Stenoma melixesta =

Scientific classification
- Domain: Eukaryota
- Kingdom: Animalia
- Phylum: Arthropoda
- Class: Insecta
- Order: Lepidoptera
- Family: Depressariidae
- Genus: Stenoma
- Species: S. melixesta

Binomial name
- Stenoma melixesta Meyrick, 1925

Species of moth

Stenoma melixesta is a moth of the family Depressariidae. It is found in Colombia.

The wingspan is about 42 mm. The forewings are ochreous, somewhat lighter towards the costa anteriorly. The dorsal edge is fuscous from near the base to the termen and the plical and second discal stigmata are small and dark fuscous, the first discal indicated by faint fuscous suffusion. There is a faintly indicated streak of slight fuscous suffusion from the middle of the costa to the dorsum at two-thirds, angulated beyond the second discal stigma. There is a gently curved line of fuscous scales from the costa at three-fourths to the dorsum towards the tornus and some slight fuscous speckling towards the termen. The hindwings are pale grey, the apical area suffused whitish yellowish.
