= Stenoma ptychocentra =

Scientific classification
- Domain: Eukaryota
- Kingdom: Animalia
- Phylum: Arthropoda
- Class: Insecta
- Order: Lepidoptera
- Family: Depressariidae
- Genus: Stenoma
- Species: S. ptychocentra

Binomial name
- Stenoma ptychocentra Meyrick, 1916

Species of moth

Stenoma ptychocentra is a moth of the family Depressariidae. It is found in French Guiana.

The wingspan is about 13 mm. The forewings are light glossy grey with the costal edge ochreous whitish and with a black basal dot in the middle. The plical stigma is conspicuous and black and there is a rather thick blackish line from three-fifths of the costa to the dorsum near the tornus, hardly curved in the middle. The area beyond this is somewhat darker grey and there is a marginal row of indistinct blackish dots around the apex and termen. The hindwings are dark grey.
