= Stenoma diorista =

Scientific classification
- Kingdom: Animalia
- Phylum: Arthropoda
- Class: Insecta
- Order: Lepidoptera
- Family: Depressariidae
- Genus: Stenoma
- Species: S. diorista

Binomial name
- Stenoma diorista (Meyrick, 1929)

Synonyms
- Ptilogenes diorista Meyrick, 1929

Species of moth

Stenoma diorista is a moth in the family Depressariidae. It was described by Edward Meyrick in 1929. It is found in Colombia.
