= Stenoma crepitans =

Scientific classification
- Kingdom: Animalia
- Phylum: Arthropoda
- Class: Insecta
- Order: Lepidoptera
- Family: Depressariidae
- Genus: Stenoma
- Species: S. crepitans

Binomial name
- Stenoma crepitans Meyrick, 1918

Species of moth

Stenoma crepitans is a moth in the family Depressariidae. It was described by Edward Meyrick in 1918. It is found in French Guiana.

The wingspan is about 17 mm. The forewings are grey whitish, very faintly violet tinged and with the extreme costal edge white. The markings are dark fuscous. There is a small spot on the base of the costa and an irregular blotch beneath the fold towards the base, and an elongate mark beyond this near the dorsum. The discal stigma are both represented by large spots, the first irregular oval, with a smaller spot above and nearly confluent with it, the second roundish, the plical dot-like, obliquely beyond the first discal. There is also a spot on the middle of the costa, where a strongly excurved cloudy somewhat interrupted line runs around the second discal stigma to the dorsum at three-fourths. A posteriorly suffused spot is found on the costa at four-fifths, where a curved series of dots runs to the dorsum before the tornus. There is also a marginal series of ten dots around the apex and termen. The hindwings are brassy whitish.
