= Stenoma thoristes =

Scientific classification
- Kingdom: Animalia
- Phylum: Arthropoda
- Clade: Pancrustacea
- Class: Insecta
- Order: Lepidoptera
- Family: Depressariidae
- Genus: Stenoma
- Species: S. thoristes

Binomial name
- Stenoma thoristes Busck, 1911

Synonyms
- Stenoma contumax Meyrick, 1916

Species of moth

Stenoma thoristes is a moth of the family Depressariidae. It is found in French Guiana.

== Description ==
The wingspan is 30–31 mm. The forewings are pale dull pinkish ochreous or whitish-flesh colour with the costal edge light yellowish and the dorsal edge slenderly suffused with reddish-fuscous irroration, sometimes forming a subdorsal blotch near the base. The stigmata are dark fuscous, the plical obliquely beyond the first discal, a small dark reddish-fuscous spot above the first discal. There is an irregular, undefined line of dark reddish-fuscous irroration from the middle of the costa, curved outwards in the disc, to three-fourths of the dorsum. A cloudy brownish or reddish-fuscous spot is found on the costa about four-fifths, where a curved row of cloudy dark brownish dots runs to the tornus, the area between this and the preceding sometimes sprinkled with brownish. A marginal row of blackish dots is found around the apex and termen. The hindwings are pale dull yellowish, the dorsal three-fifths are suffused with pale greyish, and the terminal margin marked with grey.
