= Stenoma tyrocrossa =

Scientific classification
- Domain: Eukaryota
- Kingdom: Animalia
- Phylum: Arthropoda
- Class: Insecta
- Order: Lepidoptera
- Family: Depressariidae
- Genus: Stenoma
- Species: S. tyrocrossa

Binomial name
- Stenoma tyrocrossa Meyrick, 1925

Species of moth

Stenoma tyrocrossa is a moth of the family Depressariidae. It is found in Pará, Brazil.

The wingspan is 13–14 mm. The forewings are dark grey with the costal edge white from one-fourth to three-fourths and with an oblique suffused whitish spot from the costa before the middle, followed by slight blackish suffusion. There is an evenly curved blackish line from three-fourths of the costa to the tornus, followed by white suffusion, excluded the apical and terminal area which are whitish ochreous with five blackish marginal dots and a spot of grey suffusion at the apex. The hindwings are dark grey, rather lighter in the disc towards the base.
