= Stenoma argospora =

Scientific classification
- Domain: Eukaryota
- Kingdom: Animalia
- Phylum: Arthropoda
- Class: Insecta
- Order: Lepidoptera
- Family: Depressariidae
- Genus: Stenoma
- Species: S. argospora

Binomial name
- Stenoma argospora Meyrick, 1915

Species of moth

Stenoma argospora is a moth of the family Depressariidae. It is found in French Guiana and Guyana.

The wingspan is 15–16 mm. The forewings are dark fuscous, with a slight purplish tinge and some small scattered irregular dots of white scales on the median third of the wing in the cell and a very faint curved subterminal series of small darker spots, and a marginal streak around the apex. The hindwings are blackish, in males with scattered hairscales.
