= Stenoma iatma =

Scientific classification
- Domain: Eukaryota
- Kingdom: Animalia
- Phylum: Arthropoda
- Class: Insecta
- Order: Lepidoptera
- Family: Depressariidae
- Genus: Stenoma
- Species: S. iatma

Binomial name
- Stenoma iatma Meyrick, 1915

Species of moth

Stenoma iatma is a moth of the family Depressariidae. It is found in French Guiana.

The wingspan is 21–23 mm. The forewings are pale whitish fuscous tinged with violet and with the costal edge yellow whitish. The stigmata are dark violet fuscous, the first discal indistinct, the plical obliquely beyond it, the second discal transverse. There is a small dark violet-fuscous spot on the costa beyond the middle and a large subtriangular dark violet-fuscous spot on the costa towards the apex, where a slightly curved tine fuscous line runs to the tornus. There is also a terminal series of rather large blackish dots. The hindwings are whitish ochreous, towards the apex yellowish tinged.
