= Stenoma catharmosta =

Scientific classification
- Domain: Eukaryota
- Kingdom: Animalia
- Phylum: Arthropoda
- Class: Insecta
- Order: Lepidoptera
- Family: Depressariidae
- Genus: Stenoma
- Species: S. catharmosta

Binomial name
- Stenoma catharmosta Meyrick, 1915

Species of moth

Stenoma catharmosta is a moth of the family Depressariidae. It is found in Guyana and Suriname.

The wingspan is 16–19 mm. The forewings are light pinkish ochrous with an irregular rounded blotch of blackish suffusion extending along the dorsum from one-fourth to three-fourths, and reaching half across the wing. The second discal stigma is blackish and there is a strongly curved series of blackish dots from two-thirds of the costa to the tornus, indented above the middle, as well as a series of blackish marginal dots around the posterior part of the costa and termen. The hindwings are light grey, strewn with blackish hairscales.
