= Stenoma biseriata =

Scientific classification
- Domain: Eukaryota
- Kingdom: Animalia
- Phylum: Arthropoda
- Class: Insecta
- Order: Lepidoptera
- Family: Depressariidae
- Genus: Stenoma
- Species: S. biseriata

Binomial name
- Stenoma biseriata (Zeller, 1877)

Synonyms
- Cryptolechia biseriata Zeller, 1877

Species of moth

Stenoma biseriata is a moth in the family Depressariidae. It was described by Philipp Christoph Zeller in 1877. It is found in Central America.
