= Stenoma symposias =

Scientific classification
- Domain: Eukaryota
- Kingdom: Animalia
- Phylum: Arthropoda
- Class: Insecta
- Order: Lepidoptera
- Family: Depressariidae
- Genus: Stenoma
- Species: S. symposias

Binomial name
- Stenoma symposias (Meyrick, 1915)

Synonyms
- Gonioterma symposias Meyrick, 1915; Stenoma nepheloleuca Meyrick, 1932

Species of moth

Stenoma symposias is a moth in the family Depressariidae. It was described by Edward Meyrick in 1915. It is found in Colombia and Costa Rica.

The wingspan is 17–24 mm. The forewings are fuscous purple and the costal edge is ferruginous yellow. The plical and first discal stigmata are grey whitish, the plical somewhat posterior and the second discal stigma grey, surrounded irregularly with grey whitish. There are some scattered grey-whitish scales towards the costa on the median area and a fascia of suffused grey-whitish irroration from beneath the costa at four-fifths, curved inwards to beneath the second discal stigma, then becoming broader and running to the dorsum at three-fourths. The hindwings are grey whitish, in females with the apex somewhat greyer.
