= Stenoma crocosticta =

Scientific classification
- Domain: Eukaryota
- Kingdom: Animalia
- Phylum: Arthropoda
- Class: Insecta
- Order: Lepidoptera
- Family: Depressariidae
- Genus: Stenoma
- Species: S. crocosticta

Binomial name
- Stenoma crocosticta Meyrick, 1925

Species of moth

Stenoma crocosticta is a moth of the family Depressariidae. It is found in Peru.

The wingspan is about 23 mm. The forewings are pale greyish ochreous with a greyish-ferruginous dot on the fold near the base, and dark grey elongate dot obliquely beyond and above it. The stigmata are ferruginous, the plical obliquely beyond the first discal. There is a series of indistinct light ferruginous dots from beneath the middle of the costa very obliquely outwards to beyond the second discal, then acutely angulated and continued faint and irregular to some suffusion above the dorsum beyond the middle. There is a series of cloudy subcrescentic ferruginous dots becoming dark grey towards the costa, from beneath the costa at three-fifths, very obliquely outwards and strongly curved near the termen and continued slightly sinuate to near the dorsum about four-fifths. There is also a marginal series of dark ferruginous-grey dots around the posterior part of the costa and termen. The hindwings are ochreous whitish.
