= Stenoma vapida =

Scientific classification
- Domain: Eukaryota
- Kingdom: Animalia
- Phylum: Arthropoda
- Class: Insecta
- Order: Lepidoptera
- Family: Depressariidae
- Genus: Stenoma
- Species: S. vapida

Binomial name
- Stenoma vapida (Butler, 1877)

Synonyms
- Cryptolechia vapida Butler, 1877; Stenoma acribota Meyrick, 1930

Species of moth

Stenoma vapida is a moth in the family Depressariidae. It was described by Arthur Gardiner Butler in 1877. It is found in Brazil in the states of Pará and Amazonas.
