= Stenoma phylloxantha =

Scientific classification
- Kingdom: Animalia
- Phylum: Arthropoda
- Class: Insecta
- Order: Lepidoptera
- Family: Depressariidae
- Genus: Stenoma
- Species: S. phylloxantha

Binomial name
- Stenoma phylloxantha Meyrick, 1933

Species of moth

Stenoma phylloxantha is a moth in the family Depressariidae. It was described by Edward Meyrick in 1933. It is found in Argentina.
