= Stenoma psilomorpha =

Scientific classification
- Domain: Eukaryota
- Kingdom: Animalia
- Phylum: Arthropoda
- Class: Insecta
- Order: Lepidoptera
- Family: Depressariidae
- Genus: Stenoma
- Species: S. psilomorpha

Binomial name
- Stenoma psilomorpha Meyrick, 1915

Species of moth

Stenoma psilomorpha is a moth of the family Depressariidae. It is found in Peru.

The wingspan is about 37 mm. The forewings are whitish fuscous with the extreme costal edge whitish. The stigmata are dark fuscous, the plical obliquely beyond the first discal. There is a faint fuscous irregularly curved shade from beyond the middle of the costa to three-fourths of the dorsum. A curved series of fuscous lunulate dots is found from four-fifths of the costa to the dorsum before the tornus, somewhat sinuate towards the costa. There is also a terminal series of dark fuscous dots. The hindwings are whitish ochreous.
