= Stenoma capnobola =

Scientific classification
- Kingdom: Animalia
- Phylum: Arthropoda
- Class: Insecta
- Order: Lepidoptera
- Family: Depressariidae
- Genus: Stenoma
- Species: S. capnobola

Binomial name
- Stenoma capnobola Meyrick, 1913

Species of moth

Stenoma capnobola is a moth in the family Depressariidae. It was described by Edward Meyrick in 1913. It is found in Suriname.

The wingspan is about 26 mm. The forewings are glossy pale fuscous with the costal edge whitish ochreous and with a small suffused rather dark purplish-fuscous spot towards the dorsum beyond the middle. The hindwings are grey.
