= Stenoma crypsetaera =

Scientific classification
- Kingdom: Animalia
- Phylum: Arthropoda
- Clade: Pancrustacea
- Class: Insecta
- Order: Lepidoptera
- Family: Depressariidae
- Genus: Stenoma
- Species: S. crypsetaera

Binomial name
- Stenoma crypsetaera Meyrick, 1925

Synonyms
- Stenopa crypsetaera

Species of moth

Stenoma crypsetaera is a moth of the family Depressariidae. It is found in Amazonas, Brazil.

The wingspan is about 13 mm. The forewings are greyish fuscous and the second discal stigma is cloudy and dark fuscous. There are four minute whitish dots on the costa posteriorly. The hindwings are dark grey.
