= Stenoma amphitera =

Scientific classification
- Kingdom: Animalia
- Phylum: Arthropoda
- Class: Insecta
- Order: Lepidoptera
- Family: Depressariidae
- Genus: Stenoma
- Species: S. amphitera

Binomial name
- Stenoma amphitera Meyrick, 1913

Species of moth

Stenoma amphitera is a moth in the family Depressariidae. It was described by Edward Meyrick in 1913. It is found in Peru.

The wingspan is about 25 mm. The forewings are dark purplish fuscous with a light brownish blotch occupying the basal fourth of the costa, crossed near the base by a dark fuscous shade, terminated posteriorly by a small black costal mark, and including a blackish dash in its lower portion. Two ochreous-whitish dots are found above and below the fold at one-fourth and there is a white dot indicating the plical stigma, and an ochreous-whitish ring resting on the dorsum beneath this. There is an indistinct very oblique brownish line from a slight whitish mark on the costal edge beyond the basal blotch to an obscure brownish cloud in the disc beyond the middle, followed on the costa by a very narrow flattened-triangular blackish mark. A whitish mark is found on the costa at two-thirds, and a group of fine whitish dots beneath this. There are traces of a curved series of darker dots accompanied with some whitish scales running from these to tornus, and a suffused brownish streak around the apical margin, as well as some indistinct whitish terminal dots separated by darker spots. The hindwings are rather dark fuscous.
