= Stenoma thaleropa =

Scientific classification
- Domain: Eukaryota
- Kingdom: Animalia
- Phylum: Arthropoda
- Class: Insecta
- Order: Lepidoptera
- Family: Depressariidae
- Genus: Stenoma
- Species: S. thaleropa

Binomial name
- Stenoma thaleropa Meyrick, 1916

Species of moth

Stenoma thaleropa is a moth of the family Depressariidae. It is found in French Guiana.

The wingspan is about 16 mm. The forewings are grey whitish, somewhat sprinkled with grey in the disc. There are three greyish-purple costal blotches reaching one-third across the wing, the first extending from near the base to two-fifths, the second beyond the middle, the third about four-fifths. The dorsal area is suffused with purplish grey on the anterior half. The stigmata are black, the second discal large and conspicuous, the others small, the plical obliquely beyond the first discal. There is a cloudy grey curved line from the second costal blotch to the dorsum at three-fourths and a cloudy dark grey somewhat curved line from the third costal blotch to the tornus. A suffused grey marginal streak is found around the apex and termen. The hindwings are grey.
