= Stenoma claripennis =

Scientific classification
- Kingdom: Animalia
- Phylum: Arthropoda
- Class: Insecta
- Order: Lepidoptera
- Family: Depressariidae
- Genus: Stenoma
- Species: S. claripennis

Binomial name
- Stenoma claripennis Busck, 1914

Species of moth

Stenoma claripennis is a moth in the family Depressariidae. It was described by August Busck in 1914. It is found in Panama.

The wingspan is about 16 mm. The forewings are dark olive brown with the veins outlined in light greenish yellow. The costal, apical and terminal edge are narrowly light ochreous. The hindwdngs are dark greenish fuscous with the costal area, covered by the forewings, white.
