= Stenoma benigna =

Scientific classification
- Domain: Eukaryota
- Kingdom: Animalia
- Phylum: Arthropoda
- Class: Insecta
- Order: Lepidoptera
- Family: Depressariidae
- Genus: Stenoma
- Species: S. benigna

Binomial name
- Stenoma benigna Meyrick, 1916

Species of moth

Stenoma benigna is a moth of the family Depressariidae. It is found in French Guiana.

The wingspan is 24–25 mm. The forewings are pinkish brown with the extreme costal edge rosy pink. The stigmata are dark fuscous, the plical obliquely beyond the first discal. There is some dark fuscous irroration between the first discal and middle of the costa and there is an undefined fascia of light grey suffusion and dark fuscous irroration running from two-thirds of the costa to the middle of the dorsum. There is a small cloudy dark fuscous spot on the costa at three-fourths, where a curved series of dark fuscous dots runs to the dorsum before the tornus, sinuate inwards beneath the costa. The hindwings are rose pink, with the dorsal two-fifths ochreous whitish suffused with grey.
