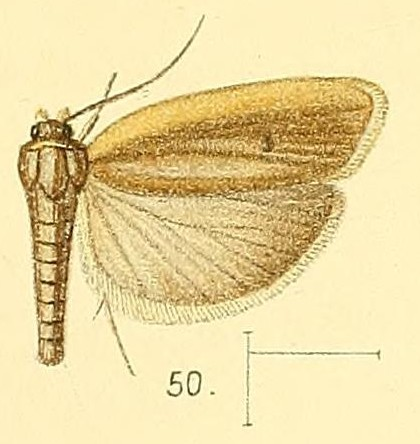
- Illustration of Stenoma complanella

Scientific classification
- Kingdom: Animalia
- Phylum: Arthropoda
- Clade: Pancrustacea
- Class: Insecta
- Order: Lepidoptera
- Family: Depressariidae
- Subfamily: Stenomatinae
- Genus: Stenoma; Zeller, 1839

Synonyms
- Auxocrossa Zeller, 1854; Diastoma Möschler, 1882

= Stenoma =

Genus of moths

Stenoma is a genus of moths. The type species is Stenoma litura, which was described by Philipp Christoph Zeller in 1839.

== Species ==
- Stenoma abductella (Walker, 1864)
- Stenoma acontiella (Walker, 1864)
- Stenoma acratodes Meyrick, 1916
- Stenoma adminiculata Meyrick, 1915
- Stenoma adoratrix Meyrick, 1925
- Stenoma adulans Meyrick, 1925
- Stenoma adustella (Walker, 1864)
- Stenoma adytodes Meyrick, 1925
- Stenoma affirmatella Busck, 1914
- Stenoma aggregata Meyrick, 1916
- Stenoma albida (Walker, 1864)
- Stenoma alligans (Butler, 1877)
- Stenoma alluvialis Meyrick, 1925
- Stenoma ambiens Meyrick, 1922
- Stenoma amphitera Meyrick, 1913
- Stenoma anaxesta Meyrick, 1915
- Stenoma ancillaris Meyrick, 1916
- Stenoma anconitis Meyrick, 1915
- Stenoma ancylacma Meyrick, 1925
- Stenoma anetodes Meyrick, 1915
- Stenoma annosa (Butler, 1877)
- Stenoma antitacta Meyrick, 1925
- Stenoma aphrophanes Meyrick, 1929
- Stenoma aplytopis Meyrick, 1930
- Stenoma apsorrhoa Meyrick, 1915
- Stenoma aptila Meyrick, 1915
- Stenoma argillacea (Zeller, 1877)
- Stenoma argospora Meyrick, 1915
- Stenoma armata (Zeller, 1877)
- Stenoma arridens Meyrick, 1931
- Stenoma ascodes Meyrick, 1915
- Stenoma assignata Meyrick, 1918
- Stenoma aterpes Walsingham, 1913
- Stenoma augescens Meyrick, 1925
- Stenoma auricoma Meyrick, 1930
- Stenoma aztecana Walsingham, 1913
- Stenoma balanoptis Meyrick, 1932
- Stenoma baliandra Meyrick, 1915
- Stenoma bathrocentra Meyrick, 1915
- Stenoma bathrogramma (Meyrick, 1912)
- Stenoma bathyntis Meyrick, 1931
- Stenoma benigna Meyrick, 1916
- Stenoma biannulata Meyrick, 1930
- Stenoma bicensa Meyrick, 1915
- Stenoma biseriata (Zeller, 1877)
- Stenoma bisignata Meyrick, 1916
- Stenoma blandula Meyrick, 1915
- Stenoma bryocosma Meyrick, 1916
- Stenoma bryoxyla Meyrick, 1915
- Stenoma byssina (Zeller, 1855)
- Stenoma bythitis Meyrick, 1915
- Stenoma caesarea Meyrick, 1915
- Stenoma caesia Meyrick, 1915
- Stenoma callicoma Meyrick, 1916
- Stenoma camarodes Meyrick, 1915
- Stenoma camptospila Meyrick, 1925
- Stenoma cana (Felder & Rogenhofer, 1875)
- Stenoma canonias (Meyrick, 1913)
- Stenoma capnobola Meyrick, 1913
- Stenoma caryodesma Meyrick, 1925
- Stenoma cassigera Meyrick, 1915
- Stenoma castellana Meyrick, 1916
- Stenoma catenifer Walsingham, 1912
- Stenoma catharmosta Meyrick, 1915
- Stenoma cathosiota Meyrick, 1925
- Stenoma chalepa Walsingham, 1913
- Stenoma chalybaeella (Walker, 1864)
- Stenoma charitarcha Meyrick, 1915
- Stenoma chionogramma (Meyrick, 1909)
- Stenoma chloroloba Meyrick, 1915
- Stenoma chloroplaca (Meyrick, 1915)
- Stenoma chloroxantha Meyrick, 1925
- Stenoma cholerocrossa Meyrick, 1930
- Stenoma chromatopa Meyrick, 1930
- Stenoma chromotechna Meyrick, 1925
- Stenoma citroxantha Meyrick, 1916
- Stenoma claripennis Busck, 1914
- Stenoma clysmographa Meyrick, 1925
- Stenoma codicata Meyrick, 1916
- Stenoma colligata Meyrick, 1915
- Stenoma collybista (Meyrick, 1915)
- Stenoma columbaris Meyrick, 1909
- Stenoma comma Busck, 1911
- Stenoma commutata (Meyrick, 1926)
- Stenoma complanella (Walsingham, 1891)
- Stenoma completella (Walker, 1864)
- Stenoma compsocharis Meyrick, 1925
- Stenoma compsocoma Meyrick, 1930
- Stenoma condemnatrix Meyrick, 1930
- Stenoma congrua Meyrick, 1925
- Stenoma coniophaea Meyrick, 1930
- Stenoma consociella (Walker, 1864)
- Stenoma conveniens Meyrick, 1925
- Stenoma convexicostata (Zeller, 1877)
- Stenoma corvula (Meyrick, 1912)
- Stenoma crambina Busck, 1920
- Stenoma crepitans Meyrick, 1918
- Stenoma crocosticta Meyrick, 1925
- Stenoma crypsangela Meyrick, 1932
- Stenoma crypsastra Meyrick, 1915
- Stenoma crypsetaera (Meyrick, 1925)
- Stenoma curtipennis (Butler, 1877)
- Stenoma cyanarcha Meyrick, 1915
- Stenoma cycnographa Meyrick, 1930
- Stenoma cymbalista Meyrick, 1918
- Stenoma cyphoxantha Meyrick, 1931
- Stenoma dasyneura Meyrick, 1922
- Stenoma decora (Zeller, 1854)
- Stenoma delphinodes Meyrick, 1925
- Stenoma deltomis Meyrick, 1925
- Stenoma deuteropa Meyrick, 1931
- Stenoma diametrica Meyrick, 1926
- Stenoma dicentra Meyrick, 1913
- Stenoma dilinopa Meyrick, 1925
- Stenoma diorista (Meyrick, 1929)
- Stenoma discrepans Meyrick, 1925
- Stenoma dispilella (Walker, 1866)
- Stenoma dorcadopa Meyrick, 1916
- Stenoma dryaula Meyrick, 1925
- Stenoma dryoconis Meyrick, 1930
- Stenoma dryocosma Meyrick, 1918
- Stenoma elaeurga Meyrick, 1926
- Stenoma embythia Meyrick, 1916
- Stenoma eminens Meyrick, 1918
- Stenoma emphanes Meyrick, 1917
- Stenoma emphatica Meyrick, 1916
- Stenoma empyrota Meyrick, 1915
- Stenoma enumerata Meyrick, 1932
- Stenoma epicnesta Meyrick, 1915
- Stenoma epicta Walsingham, 1912
- Stenoma epipacta Meyrick, 1915
- Stenoma eumenodora Meyrick, 1937
- Stenoma eusticta Meyrick, 1916
- Stenoma eva Meyrick, 1915
- Stenoma evanescens (Butler, 1877)
- Stenoma exarata (Zeller, 1854)
- Stenoma exempta Meyrick, 1925
- Stenoma exhalata Meyrick, 1915
- Stenoma explicita Meyrick, 1930
- Stenoma externella (Walker, 1864)
- Stenoma fallax (Butler, 1877)
- Stenoma fassliana (Dognin, 1913)
- Stenoma farraria Meyrick, 1915
- Stenoma fenestra Busck, 1914
- Stenoma ferculata Meyrick, 1922
- Stenoma ferrocanella (Walker, 1864)
- Stenoma finitrix Meyrick, 1925
- Stenoma flavicosta (Felder & Rogenhofer, 1875)
- Stenoma frondifer Busck, 1914
- Stenoma fulcrata Meyrick, 1915
- Stenoma funerana (Sepp, [1847])
- Stenoma fusistrigella (Walker, 1864)
- Stenoma futura Meyrick, 1913
- Stenoma gemellata Meyrick, 1916
- Stenoma grandaeva (Zeller, 1854)
- Stenoma graphica Busck, 1920
- Stenoma gymnastis Meyrick, 1915
- Stenoma halmas Meyrick, 1925
- Stenoma haploxyla Meyrick, 1915
- Stenoma harpoceros Meyrick, 1930
- Stenoma hectorea (Meyrick, 1915)
- Stenoma hemilampra Meyrick, 1915
- Stenoma hemiphanta Meyrick, 1925
- Stenoma herifuga Meyrick, 1932
- Stenoma hesmarcha (Meyrick, 1930)
- Stenoma heteroxantha Meyrick, 1931
- Stenoma himerodes Meyrick, 1916
- Stenoma holcadica Meyrick, 1916
- Stenoma holophaea (Meyrick, 1916)
- Stenoma homala Walsingham, 1912
- Stenoma hopfferi (Zeller, 1854)
- Stenoma hoplitica Meyrick, 1925
- Stenoma horocharis Meyrick, 1930
- Stenoma horocyma Meyrick, 1925
- Stenoma hospitalis Meyrick, 1915
- Stenoma hyacinthitis Meyrick, 1930
- Stenoma hyalocryptis Meyrick, 1930
- Stenoma hydraena Meyrick, 1916
- Stenoma hypocirrha Meyrick, 1930
- Stenoma iatma Meyrick, 1915
- Stenoma icteropis Meyrick, 1925
- Stenoma immersa Walsingham, 1913
- Stenoma immunda (Zeller, 1854)
- Stenoma impressella (Busck, 1914)
- Stenoma impurata Meyrick, 1915
- Stenoma inardescens Meyrick, 1925
- Stenoma inflata (Butler, 1877)
- Stenoma infusa Meyrick, 1916
- Stenoma injucunda Meyrick, 1925
- Stenoma invulgata Meyrick, 1915
- Stenoma iocoma Meyrick, 1915
- Stenoma iopercna Meyrick, 1932
- Stenoma iostalacta Meyrick, 1925
- Stenoma irascens Meyrick, 1930
- Stenoma jucunda Meyrick, 1915
- Stenoma klemaniana (Stoll, [1781])
- Stenoma lapidea Meyrick, 1916
- Stenoma lapilella (Busck, 1914)
- Stenoma latitans (Dognin, 1905)
- Stenoma lavata Walsingham, 1913
- Stenoma leptogma Meyrick, 1925
- Stenoma leucana (Sepp, [1844])
- Stenoma leucaniella (Walker, 1864)
- Stenoma libertina Meyrick, 1916
- Stenoma litura Zeller, 1839
- Stenoma lucidiorella (Walker, 1864)
- Stenoma luctifica (Zeller, 1877)
- Stenoma macraulax Meyrick, 1930
- Stenoma macroptycha Meyrick, 1930
- Stenoma melanesia Meyrick, 1912
- Stenoma melanixa Meyrick, 1912
- Stenoma meligrapta Meyrick, 1925
- Stenoma melinopa Meyrick, 1925
- Stenoma melixesta Meyrick, 1925
- Stenoma meridogramma Meyrick, 1930
- Stenoma methystica Meyrick, 1930
- Stenoma metroleuca Meyrick, 1930
- Stenoma meyeriana (Stoll, [1781])
- Stenoma milichodes Meyrick, 1915
- Stenoma minor Busck, 1914
- Stenoma mniodora Meyrick, 1925
- Stenoma modicola Meyrick, 1911
- Stenoma mundula Meyrick, 1916
- Stenoma muscula (Zeller, 1877)
- Stenoma myrrhinopa (Meyrick, 1932)
- Stenoma nebrita Walsingham, 1913
- Stenoma negotiosa Meyrick, 1925
- Stenoma neopercna Meyrick, 1930
- Stenoma neoptila Meyrick, 1925
- Stenoma neurocentra Meyrick, 1925
- Stenoma neurotona (Meyrick, 1915)
- Stenoma nigricans (Busck, 1914)
- Stenoma niphacma Meyrick, 1916
- Stenoma niphochlaena (Meyrick, 1926)
- Stenoma nubilella (Möschler, 1882)
- Stenoma nycteropa Meyrick, 1915
- Stenoma oblita (Butler, 1877)
- Stenoma obovata Meyrick, 1931
- Stenoma ochlodes Walsingham, 1912
- Stenoma ochricollis (Zeller, 1877)
- Stenoma ochropa Walsingham, 1913
- Stenoma ochrothicata Meyrick, 1925
- Stenoma orneopis Meyrick, 1925
- Stenoma orthocapna Meyrick, 1912
- Stenoma orthographa Meyrick, 1925
- Stenoma ortholampra Meyrick, 1930
- Stenoma ovatella (Walker, 1864)
- Stenoma oxyschista Meyrick, 1925
- Stenoma oxyscia Meyrick, 1922
- Stenoma pantogenes Meyrick, 1930
- Stenoma paracapna Meyrick, 1915
- Stenoma paraplecta Meyrick, 1925
- Stenoma pardalodes Meyrick, 1918
- Stenoma paropta Meyrick, 1916
- Stenoma patellifera Meyrick, 1931
- Stenoma patens Meyrick, 1913
- Stenoma peccans (Butler, 1877)
- Stenoma periaula Meyrick, 1916
- Stenoma peridesma Meyrick, 1925
- Stenoma perirrhoa Meyrick, 1930
- Stenoma perjecta Meyrick, 1931
- Stenoma peronia Busck, 1913
- Stenoma persita Meyrick, 1915
- Stenoma pertinax Meyrick, 1915
- Stenoma phaeomistis Meyrick, 1925
- Stenoma phalacropa Meyrick, 1932
- Stenoma phylloxantha Meyrick, 1933
- Stenoma picrantis Meyrick, 1930
- Stenoma picta (Zeller, 1854)
- Stenoma plagosa (Zeller, 1877)
- Stenoma platyphylla Meyrick, 1916
- Stenoma platyterma Meyrick, 1915
- Stenoma plurima Walsingham, 1912
- Stenoma porphyrastis Meyrick, 1915
- Stenoma praecauta Meyrick, 1916
- Stenoma procritica Meyrick, 1925
- Stenoma promotella (Zeller, 1877)
- Stenoma psalmographa Meyrick, 1931
- Stenoma psilomorpha Meyrick, 1915
- Stenoma ptychobathra Meyrick, 1930
- Stenoma ptychocentra Meyrick, 1916
- Stenoma ptychophthalma Meyrick, 1930
- Stenoma pustulatella (Walker, 1864)
- Stenoma pyramidea Walsingham, 1913
- Stenoma pyrrhias Meyrick, 1915
- Stenoma pyrrhonota Meyrick, 1915
- Stenoma receptella (Walker, 1864)
- Stenoma recondita Meyrick, 1915
- Stenoma redintegrata Meyrick, 1925
- Stenoma regesta Meyrick, 1926
- Stenoma relata Meyrick, 1925
- Stenoma residuella (Zeller, 1877)
- Stenoma reticens Meyrick, 1917
- Stenoma rhodocolpa Meyrick, 1916
- Stenoma rhothiodes Meyrick, 1915
- Stenoma rosa (Busck, 1911)
- Stenoma sagax Busck, 1914
- Stenoma salome Busck, 1911
- Stenoma salubris Meyrick, 1925
- Stenoma satelles Meyrick, 1925
- Stenoma sciogama Meyrick, 1930
- Stenoma scitiorella (Walker, 1864)
- Stenoma scoliandra Meyrick, 1915
- Stenoma scoriodes (Meyrick, 1915)
- Stenoma secundata Meyrick, 1925
- Stenoma sematopa Meyrick, 1915
- Stenoma sequestra Meyrick, 1918
- Stenoma sericata (Butler, 1877)
- Stenoma sesquitertia (Zeller, 1854)
- Stenoma sexmaculata (Dognin, 1904)
- Stenoma simplex Busck, 1914
- Stenoma simulatrix Meyrick, 1914
- Stenoma sinuata (Fabricius, 1798)
- Stenoma sommerella (Zeller, 1877)
- Stenoma spodinopis Meyrick, 1931
- Stenoma stabilis (Butler, 1877)
- Stenoma staudingerana (Maassen, 1890)
- Stenoma stephanodes Meyrick, 1931
- Stenoma stolida Meyrick, 1911
- Stenoma straminella (Walker, 1864)
- Stenoma strenuella (Walker, 1864)
- Stenoma striatella Busck, 1914
- Stenoma strigivenata (Butler, 1877)
- Stenoma stupefacta Meyrick, 1916
- Stenoma subita (Meyrick, 1925)
- Stenoma sublimbata (Zeller, 1877)
- Stenoma submersa Meyrick, 1915
- Stenoma subnotatella (Walker, 1864)
- Stenoma suffumata (Walsingham, 1897)
- Stenoma surinamella (Möschler, 1883)
- Stenoma sustentata Meyrick, 1926
- Stenoma symmicta Walsingham, 1913
- Stenoma symphonica Meyrick, 1916
- Stenoma symposias (Meyrick, 1915)
- Stenoma syngraphopis Meyrick, 1930
- Stenoma tetrabola Meyrick, 1913
- Stenoma thaleropa Meyrick, 1916
- Stenoma thespia Meyrick, 1915
- Stenoma thologramma (Meyrick, 1932)
- Stenoma thoristes Busck, 1911
- Stenoma thylacandra Meyrick, 1915
- Stenoma tolmeta Walsingham, 1912
- Stenoma trichocolpa Meyrick, 1915
- Stenoma trichorda Meyrick, 1912
- Stenoma trilineata (Butler, 1877)
- Stenoma tripustulata (Zeller, 1854)
- Stenoma trirecta Meyrick, 1931
- Stenoma tristrigata (Zeller, 1854)
- Stenoma tyrocrossa Meyrick, 1925
- Stenoma ulosema Meyrick, 1930
- Stenoma umbrinervis Meyrick, 1930
- Stenoma uncticoma Meyrick, 1916
- Stenoma unguentata Meyrick, 1930
- Stenoma uruguayensis (Berg, 1885)
- Stenoma vaccula Walsingham, 1913
- Stenoma vaga (Butler, 1877)
- Stenoma vapida (Butler, 1877)
- Stenoma vasifera Meyrick, 1925
- Stenoma ventilatrix Meyrick, 1916
- Stenoma vexata Meyrick, 1915
- Stenoma vinifera Meyrick, 1915
- Stenoma viridiceps (Felder & Rogenhofer, 1875)
- Stenoma vita (Busck, 1911)
- Stenoma vitreola Meyrick, 1925
- Stenoma vivax Busck, 1914
- Stenoma volitans Meyrick, 1925
- Stenoma xanthophaeella (Walker, 1864)
- Stenoma xylinopa (Meyrick, 1925)
- Stenoma ybyrajubu Becker, 1971
- Stenoma zephyritis Meyrick, 1925
- Stenoma zobeida Meyrick, 1931
