= Stenoma chromotechna =

Scientific classification
- Domain: Eukaryota
- Kingdom: Animalia
- Phylum: Arthropoda
- Class: Insecta
- Order: Lepidoptera
- Family: Depressariidae
- Genus: Stenoma
- Species: S. chromotechna

Binomial name
- Stenoma chromotechna Meyrick, 1925

Species of moth

Stenoma chromotechna is a moth of the family Depressariidae. It is found in Brazil (Amazonas).

The wingspan is about 17 mm. The forewings are light greyish violet with the basal third of the dorsum and projecting scales ferruginous brown. There is a fine white longitudinal line from the base just above this extending to the middle and the costal edge is whitish. A slender blackish streak is found from the costa at one-fourth to the dorsum near the tornus, expanded on the costa, partially tinged brownish on its edges, margined with a whitish streak anteriorly to the fold and posteriorly beyond the fold, preceded on the fold by a small greyish and ochreous tuft. The space between this and the next streak is mixed or tinged whitish ochreous and there is an oblique dark brown white-margined fasciate streak from the middle of the costa reaching half across the wing, then becoming black and continued by a blackish line to the dorsum where it almost meets the apex of the preceding. The apical fourth of the wing forms a blotch with the anterior edge slightly convex, its anterior half whitish, the posterior pale ochreous. There is a marginal series of blackish dots around apex and termen. The hindwings are rather dark grey.
