= E. formosa =

E. formosa may refer to:

- Eilema formosa, a Malagasy moth
- Elachura formosa, a passerine bird
- Encarsia formosa, a parasitic wasp
- Enchelynassa formosa, a saltwater eel
- Euchromia formosa, an African moth
- Eudonia formosa, a moth endemic to Hawaii
- Eudromia formosa, a South American tinamou
- Eufriesea formosa, a euglossine bee
- Eulepidotis formosa, a neotropical moth
- Eupithecia formosa, a Chinese moth
