= Eulepidotis stella =

Scientific classification
- Kingdom: Animalia
- Phylum: Arthropoda
- Class: Insecta
- Order: Lepidoptera
- Superfamily: Noctuoidea
- Family: Erebidae
- Genus: Eulepidotis
- Species: E. stella

Binomial name
- Eulepidotis stella (Bar, 1875)

Synonyms
- Palindia stella Bar, 1875; Eulepidotis corinna Guenée; Eulepidotis regalis (Butler, 1879) – treated as valid by Savela

Species of moth

Eulepidotis stella is a moth of the family Erebidae. It was described by Constant Bar in 1875. It is found in the Neotropical realm, including French Guiana, Brazil (Pará), and Bolivia.

The wingspan is 30 mm (1.2 in).
