= Eulepidotis vicentiata =

Scientific classification
- Domain: Eukaryota
- Kingdom: Animalia
- Phylum: Arthropoda
- Class: Insecta
- Order: Lepidoptera
- Superfamily: Noctuoidea
- Family: Erebidae
- Genus: Eulepidotis
- Species: E. vicentiata

Binomial name
- Eulepidotis vicentiata (Stoll, 1790)

Synonyms
- Phalaena vicentiata Stoll, 1790

Species of moth

Eulepidotis vicentiata is a moth of the family Erebidae first described by Caspar Stoll in 1790. It is found in the Neotropics, including Suriname.
