= Eulepidotis juliata =

Scientific classification
- Domain: Eukaryota
- Kingdom: Animalia
- Phylum: Arthropoda
- Class: Insecta
- Order: Lepidoptera
- Superfamily: Noctuoidea
- Family: Erebidae
- Genus: Eulepidotis
- Species: E. juliata

Binomial name
- Eulepidotis juliata (Stoll, 1790)

Synonyms
- Phalaena juliata Stoll, 1790; Eulepidotis julianata; Palindia egala Walker, 1865

Species of moth

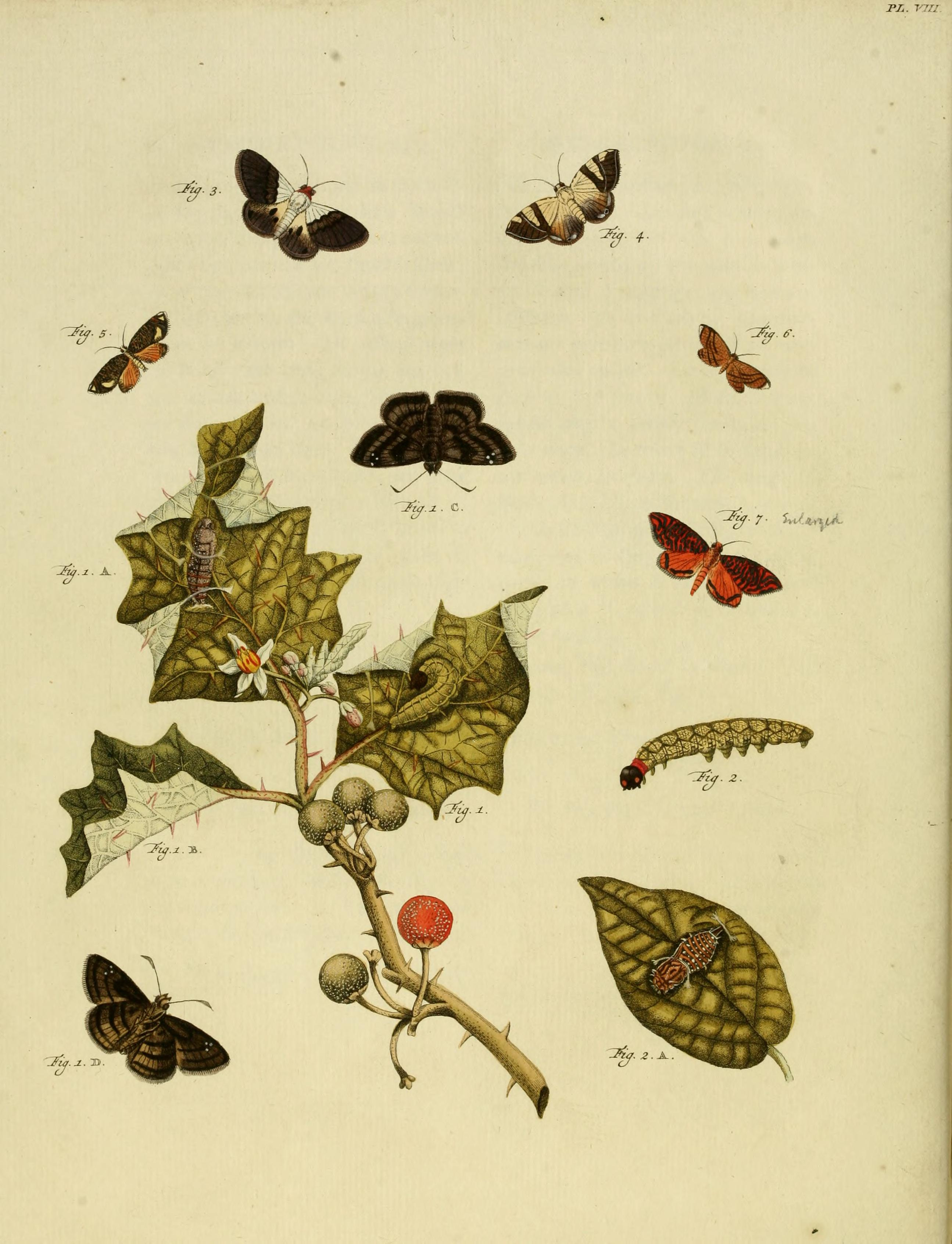
1779 illustrations from "De uitlandsche kapellen” by Caspar Stoll. Figure 4 is E. juliata (called ”julianata” in the text).

Eulepidotis juliata is a moth of the family Erebidae first described by Caspar Stoll in 1790. It is found in the Neotropics, including Peru, Ecuador and the Brazilian locality of Tefé.
