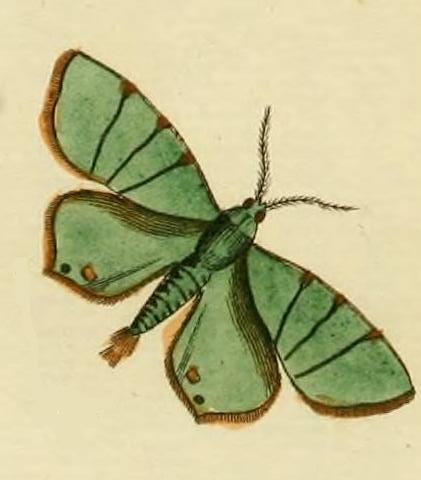

Scientific classification
- Domain: Eukaryota
- Kingdom: Animalia
- Phylum: Arthropoda
- Class: Insecta
- Order: Lepidoptera
- Superfamily: Noctuoidea
- Family: Erebidae
- Genus: Eulepidotis
- Species: E. ilyrias

Binomial name
- Eulepidotis ilyrias (Cramer, 1776)

Synonyms
- Phalaena ilyrias Cramer, [1775]; Eulepidotis illyraria Hübner, [1823]; Eulepidotis illyriaria Hubner, 1823; Phalaena ilyraria Fabricius, 1777

= Eulepidotis ilyrias =

Species of moth

Eulepidotis ilyrias is a moth of the family Erebidae first described by Pieter Cramer in 1776. It is found in French Guiana.
