= Eulepidotis corinna =

Scientific classification
- Kingdom: Animalia
- Phylum: Arthropoda
- Clade: Pancrustacea
- Class: Insecta
- Order: Lepidoptera
- Superfamily: Noctuoidea
- Family: Erebidae
- Genus: Eulepidotis
- Species: E. corinna

Binomial name
- Eulepidotis corinna (Cramer, [1776])

Synonyms
- Phalaena corrina Cramer, [1776]; Palindia corinna (Cramer, [1776]); Guenée, 1852; Phrygionis quadrilinea Kaye, 1901; Eulepidotis prismatica Dyar, 1914

Species of moth

Eulepidotis corinna is a moth of the family Erebidae first described by Pieter Cramer in "1776" as "Phalæna Noctua corinna" from collections in Suriname. The year of publication varies in sources, with the descriptive text published in 1775 under the name "corinna", but the full nomenclature was then stated in the subsequent index, published in 1776. Several sources take that later 1776 date as the official date for availability per Zoological nomenclature. Much later, in some online databases, the species name has appear misspelt as corrina It is found in the Neotropics in northern parts of South America with published records focused around The Guianas, including Suriname, French Guiana and Trinidad.
