= Eulepidotis emilia =

Scientific classification
- Domain: Eukaryota
- Kingdom: Animalia
- Phylum: Arthropoda
- Class: Insecta
- Order: Lepidoptera
- Superfamily: Noctuoidea
- Family: Erebidae
- Genus: Eulepidotis
- Species: E. emilia

Binomial name
- Eulepidotis emilia (Bar, 1875)

Synonyms
- Palindia emilia Bar, 1875

Species of moth

Eulepidotis emilia is a moth of the family Erebidae first described by Constant Bar in 1875. It is found in the Neotropics, including French Guiana, Guyana and Peru.
