= Eulepidotis bourgaulti =

Scientific classification
- Domain: Eukaryota
- Kingdom: Animalia
- Phylum: Arthropoda
- Class: Insecta
- Order: Lepidoptera
- Superfamily: Noctuoidea
- Family: Erebidae
- Genus: Eulepidotis
- Species: E. bourgaulti

Binomial name
- Eulepidotis bourgaulti (Bar, 1875)

Synonyms
- Calydia bourgaulti Bar, 1875; Phrygionis setosa Butler, 1879

Species of moth

Eulepidotis bourgaulti is a moth of the family Erebidae first described by Constant Bar in 1875. It is found in the Neotropical realm, including French Guiana, the Brazilian state of Amazonas and Peru.
