= Eulepidotis chloris =

Scientific classification
- Domain: Eukaryota
- Kingdom: Animalia
- Phylum: Arthropoda
- Class: Insecta
- Order: Lepidoptera
- Superfamily: Noctuoidea
- Family: Erebidae
- Genus: Eulepidotis
- Species: E. chloris

Binomial name
- Eulepidotis chloris (Bar, 1876)

Synonyms
- Palindia chloris Bar, 1876

Species of moth

Eulepidotis chloris is a moth of the family Erebidae first described by Constant Bar in 1876. It is found in the Neotropics, including French Guiana.
