= Antaeotricha renselariana =

Scientific classification
- Domain: Eukaryota
- Kingdom: Animalia
- Phylum: Arthropoda
- Class: Insecta
- Order: Lepidoptera
- Family: Depressariidae
- Genus: Antaeotricha
- Species: A. renselariana

Binomial name
- Antaeotricha renselariana (Stoll, [1781])

Synonyms
- Phalaena (Tortrix) renselariana Stoll, [1781]; Pyralis bahiensis Perty, 1834

Species of moth

Antaeotricha renselariana is a moth in the family Depressariidae. It was described by Caspar Stoll in 1781. It is found in Panama, Suriname, French Guiana, Brazil (Amazonas, Para, Bahia) and Peru.
