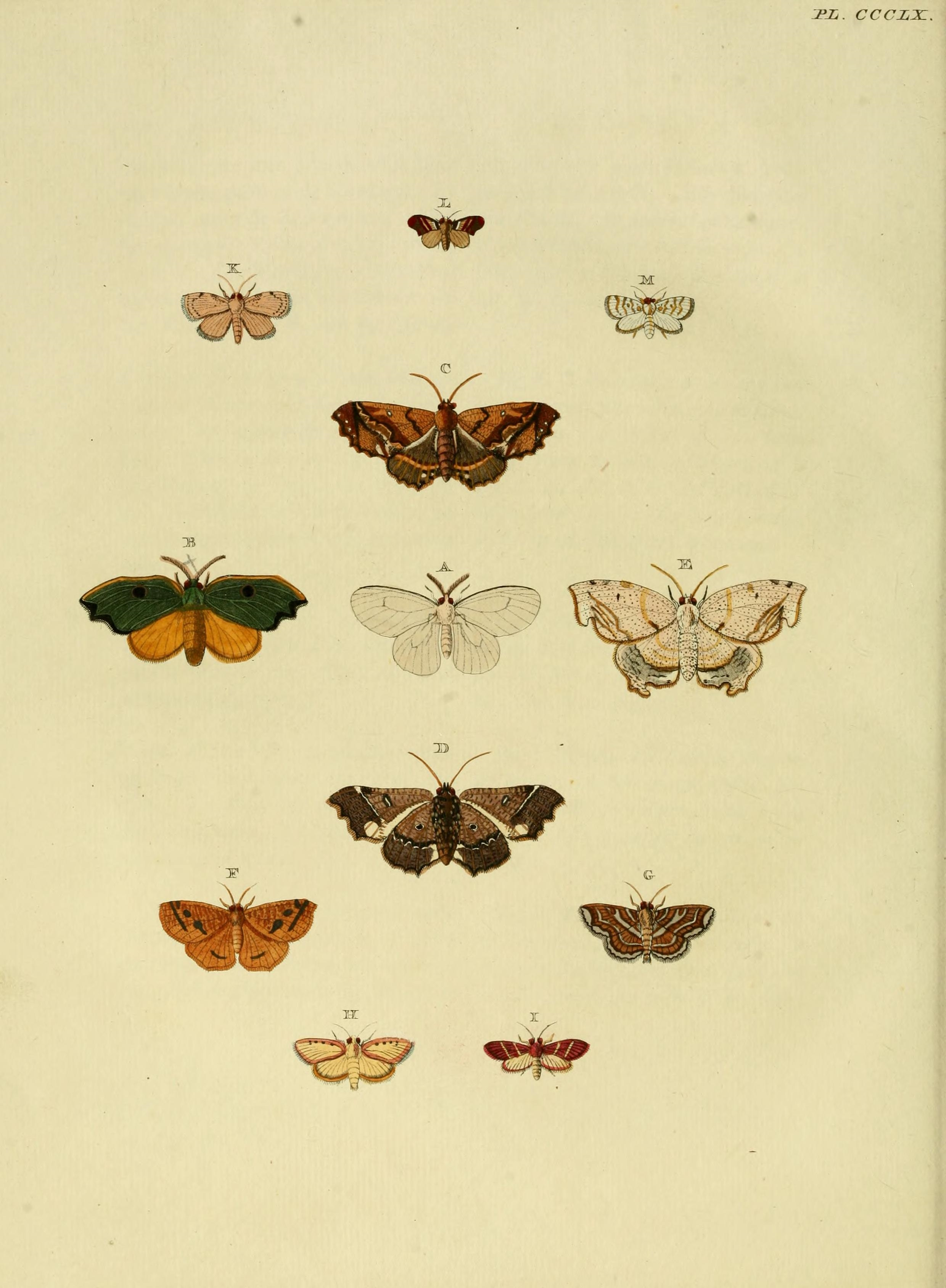

Scientific classification
- Domain: Eukaryota
- Kingdom: Animalia
- Phylum: Arthropoda
- Class: Insecta
- Order: Lepidoptera
- Family: Depressariidae
- Genus: Stenoma
- Species: S. meyeriana

Binomial name
- Stenoma meyeriana (Stoll, [1781])

Synonyms
- Phalaena meyeriana Stoll, [1781]

= Stenoma meyeriana =

Species of moth

Stenoma meyeriana is a moth in the family Depressariidae. It was described by Caspar Stoll in 1781. It is found in the Guianas.
