= Eulepidotis preclara =

Scientific classification
- Domain: Eukaryota
- Kingdom: Animalia
- Phylum: Arthropoda
- Class: Insecta
- Order: Lepidoptera
- Superfamily: Noctuoidea
- Family: Erebidae
- Genus: Eulepidotis
- Species: E. preclara

Binomial name
- Eulepidotis preclara Todd, 1962

Species of moth

Eulepidotis preclara is a moth of the family Erebidae. It is found in the Neotropical realm, including Peru.

It was described by Edward L. Todd in 1962.
