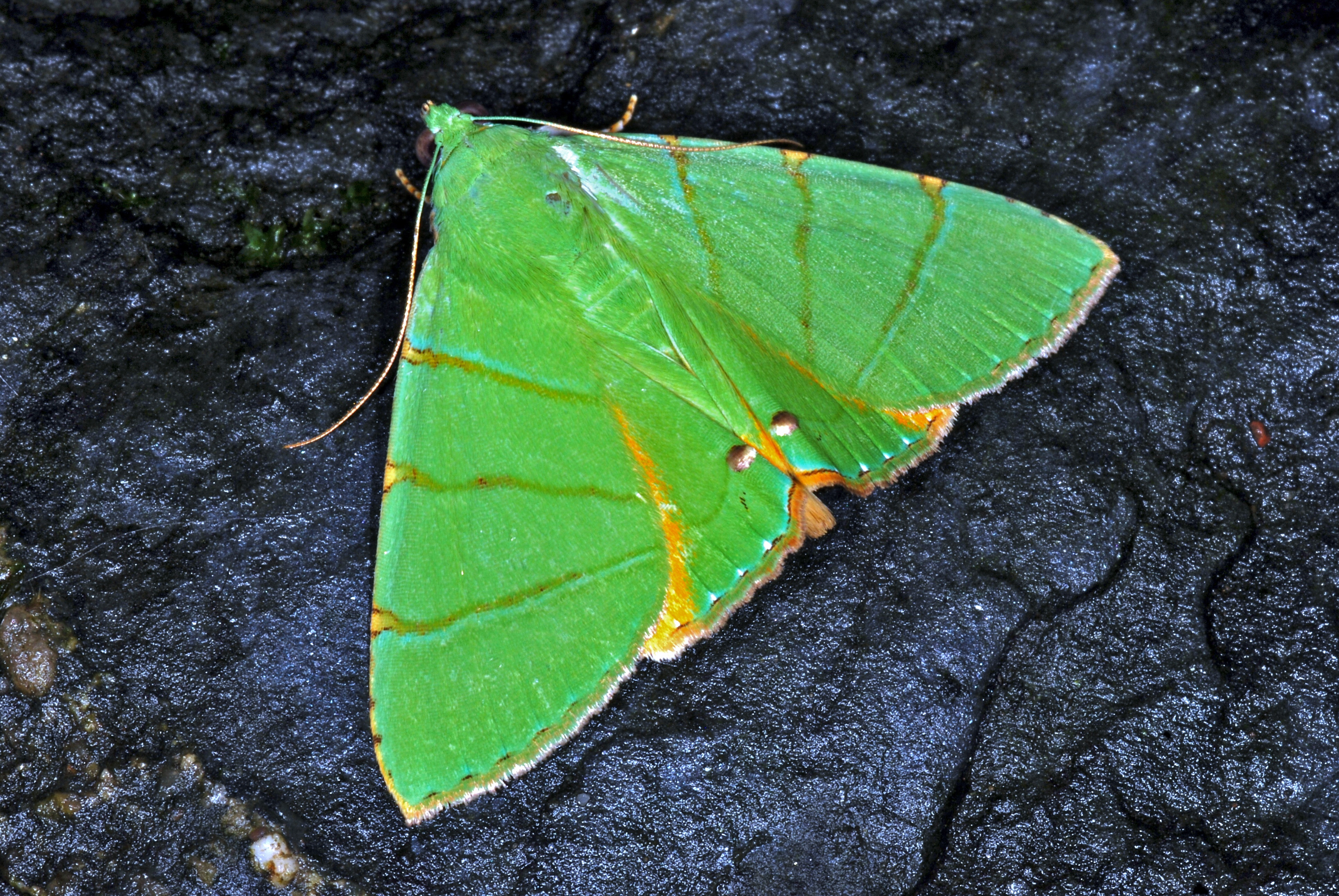
- Eulepidotis viridissima

Scientific classification
- Kingdom: Animalia
- Phylum: Arthropoda
- Clade: Pancrustacea
- Class: Insecta
- Order: Lepidoptera
- Superfamily: Noctuoidea
- Family: Erebidae
- Subfamily: Eulepidotinae
- Genus: Eulepidotis; Hübner, 1823

Synonyms
- Calydia Bar, 1875; Palindia Guenee, 1852; Palindiona Hampson, 1926; Peropalpus Blanchard, 1852

= Eulepidotis =

Genus of moths

Eulepidotis is a genus of moths of the family Erebidae erected by Jacob Hübner in 1823.

== Species ==
- Eulepidotis addens (Walker, 1858)
- Eulepidotis affinis (Schaus, 1911)
- Eulepidotis aglae (Schaus, 1921)
- Eulepidotis alabastraria (Hubner, 1823)
- Eulepidotis albata (Felder & Rogenhofer, 1874)
- Eulepidotis albidus (Blanchard, 1852)
- Eulepidotis albistriata (Hampson, 1926)
- Eulepidotis anna (Dyar, 1914)
- Eulepidotis argentilinea (Schaus, 1906)
- Eulepidotis argyritis (Butler, 1879)
- Eulepidotis atalanta (Bar, 1876)
- Eulepidotis austrina (Schaus, 1911)
- Eulepidotis bipartita (Dognin, 1914)
- Eulepidotis bourgaulti (Bar, 1875)
- Eulepidotis caeruleilinea (Walker, 1858)
- Eulepidotis candida (Bar, 1876)
- Eulepidotis carcistola (Hampson, 1926)
- Eulepidotis caudatula (Herrich-Schaffer, 1854)
- Eulepidotis chloris (Bar, 1876)
- Eulepidotis columbrata (Dyar, 1915)
- Eulepidotis colleti Barbut & Lalanne-Cassou, 2011
- Eulepidotis corinna (Cramer, 1775)
- Eulepidotis croceipars (Dyar, 1914)
- Eulepidotis crocoptera (Felder & Rogenhofer, 1874)
- Eulepidotis crocota (Hampson, 1926)
- Eulepidotis deiliniaria (Hampson, 1926)
- Eulepidotis delecta (Schaus, 1911)
- Eulepidotis detracta (Walker, 1858)
- Eulepidotis dives (Butler, 1879)
- Eulepidotis dominicata (Guenee, 1852)
- Eulepidotis electa (Dyar, 1914)
- Eulepidotis emilia (Bar, 1875)
- Eulepidotis erina (Dyar, 1914)
- Eulepidotis ezra (Druce, 1898)
- Eulepidotis flavipex (Dognin, 1914)
- Eulepidotis folium (Schaus, 1911)
- Eulepidotis formosa (Bar, 1875)
- Eulepidotis fortissima (Dyar, 1914)
- Eulepidotis geminata (Packard, 1869)
- Eulepidotis graminea (Hampson, 1926)
- Eulepidotis guttata (Felder & Rogenhofer, 1874)
- Eulepidotis hebe (Moschler, 1890)
- Eulepidotis hemileuca (Guenee, 1852)
- Eulepidotis hemithea (Druce, 1889)
- Eulepidotis hermura (Schaus, 1898)
- Eulepidotis holoclera (Dyar, 1914)
- Eulepidotis ilyrias (Cramer, 1776)
- Eulepidotis inclyta (Fabricius, 1775)
- Eulepidotis juliata (Stoll, 1790)
- Eulepidotis juncida (Guenee, 1852)
- Eulepidotis junetta (Dyar, 1914)
- Eulepidotis magica Dyar, 1914)
- Eulepidotis merosticta (Hampson, 1926)
- Eulepidotis merricki (Holland, 1902)
- Eulepidotis mesomphala (Hampson, 1926)
- Eulepidotis metalligera (Butler, 1879)
- Eulepidotis metamorpha (Dyar, 1914)
- Eulepidotis micca (Druce, 1889)
- Eulepidotis microleuca (Dyar, 1914)
- Eulepidotis modestula (Herrich-Schaffer, 1869)
- Eulepidotis mustela (Druce, 1889)
- Eulepidotis nicaea (Druce, 1900)
- Eulepidotis norduca (Schaus, 1901)
- Eulepidotis ornata (Bar, 1876)
- Eulepidotis ornatoides (Poole, 1989)
- Eulepidotis osseata (Bar, 1875)
- Eulepidotis ouocco (Dyar, 1914)
- Eulepidotis panamensis (Hampson, 1926)
- Eulepidotis penumbra (Dyar, 1914)
- Eulepidotis perducens (Walker, 1858)
- Eulepidotis perlata (Guenee, 1852)
- Eulepidotis persimilis (Guenee, 1852)
- Eulepidotis philosis (Schaus, 1921)
- Eulepidotis phrygionia (Hampson, 1926)
- Eulepidotis preclara (Todd, 1962)
- Eulepidotis primulina (Druce, 1900)
- Eulepidotis prismatica (Dyar, 1914)
- Eulepidotis pulchella (Bar, 1876)
- Eulepidotis punctilinea (Schaus, 1921)
- Eulepidotis rectimargo (Guenee, 1852)
- Eulepidotis reducens (Dyar, 1914)
- Eulepidotis regalis (Butler, 1879)
- Eulepidotis reticulata (Bar, 1876)
- Eulepidotis sabina (Bar, 1875)
- Eulepidotis santarema (Walker, 1865)
- Eulepidotis santosina (Hampson, 1926)
- Eulepidotis schedoglauca (Dyar, 1914)
- Eulepidotis scita (Walker, 1869)
- Eulepidotis selecta (Dyar, 1914)
- Eulepidotis serpentifera (Brabant, 1909)
- Eulepidotis stella (Bar, 1875)
- Eulepidotis stigmastica (Dyar, 1914)
- Eulepidotis striaepuncta (Herrich-Schaffer, 1868)
- Eulepidotis striataria (Stoll, 1782)
- Eulepidotis superior (Guenee, 1852)
- Eulepidotis suppura (Dyar, 1914)
- Eulepidotis suzetta (Dyar, 1914)
- Eulepidotis sylpha (Dyar, 1914)
- Eulepidotis tabasconis (Hampson, 1926)
- Eulepidotis teligera (Brabant, 1910)
- Eulepidotis testaceiceps (Felder & Rogenhofer, 1874)
- Eulepidotis thermochroa (Hampson, 1926)
- Eulepidotis transcendens (Dyar, 1914)
- Eulepidotis umbrilinea (Dognin, 1914)
- Eulepidotis vicentiata (Stoll, 1790)
- Eulepidotis viridissima (Bar, 1876)
- Eulepidotis zebra (Barbut & Lalanne-Cassou, 2010)

== Former species ==
- Dyomyx egista (Bar, 1876) (described as Eulepidotis egista)
- Dyomyx egistoides (Bar, 1876) (described as Eulepidotis egistoides)
- Eulepidotis reflexa (Herrich-Schaffer, 1869) is now a synonym of Lepidomys irrenosa
