= Eulepidotis ornata =

Scientific classification
- Domain: Eukaryota
- Kingdom: Animalia
- Phylum: Arthropoda
- Class: Insecta
- Order: Lepidoptera
- Superfamily: Noctuoidea
- Family: Erebidae
- Genus: Eulepidotis
- Species: E. ornata

Binomial name
- Eulepidotis ornata (Bar, 1876)

Synonyms
- Palindia ornata Bar, 1876

Species of moth

Eulepidotis ornata is a moth of the family Erebidae first described by Constant Bar in 1876. It is found in the Neotropical realm, including French Guiana, Guyana, Peru and Ecuador.
