= Eulepidotis reticulata =

Scientific classification
- Domain: Eukaryota
- Kingdom: Animalia
- Phylum: Arthropoda
- Class: Insecta
- Order: Lepidoptera
- Superfamily: Noctuoidea
- Family: Erebidae
- Genus: Eulepidotis
- Species: E. reticulata

Binomial name
- Eulepidotis reticulata (Bar, 1876)

Synonyms
- Palindia reticulata Bar, 1876; Palindia diana Möschler, 1880

Species of moth

Eulepidotis reticulata is a moth of the family Erebidae first described by Constant Bar in 1876. It is found in the Neotropics, including French Guiana, Suriname and Guyana.
