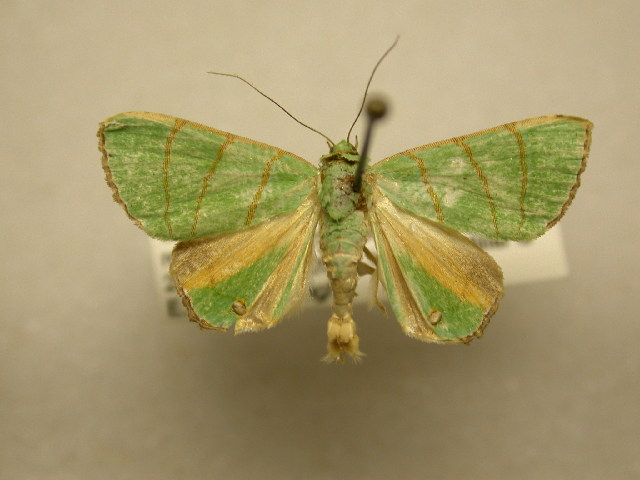

Scientific classification
- Domain: Eukaryota
- Kingdom: Animalia
- Phylum: Arthropoda
- Class: Insecta
- Order: Lepidoptera
- Superfamily: Noctuoidea
- Family: Erebidae
- Genus: Eulepidotis
- Species: E. viridissima

Binomial name
- Eulepidotis viridissima (Bar, 1876)

Synonyms
- Palindia viridissima Bar, 1876

= Eulepidotis viridissima =

Species of moth

Eulepidotis viridissima is a moth of the family Erebidae first described by Constant Bar in 1876. It is found in the Neotropics, including Costa Rica, Peru, Ecuador, French Guiana and Guyana.
