= Eulepidotis striataria =

Scientific classification
- Domain: Eukaryota
- Kingdom: Animalia
- Phylum: Arthropoda
- Class: Insecta
- Order: Lepidoptera
- Superfamily: Noctuoidea
- Family: Erebidae
- Genus: Eulepidotis
- Species: E. striataria

Binomial name
- Eulepidotis striataria (Stoll, 1781)

Synonyms
- Phalaena striataria Stoll, 1781

Species of moth

Eulepidotis striataria is a moth of the family Erebidae first described by Caspar Stoll in 1781. It is found in the Neotropics, including Suriname.
