= Eulepidotis modestula =

Scientific classification
- Domain: Eukaryota
- Kingdom: Animalia
- Phylum: Arthropoda
- Class: Insecta
- Order: Lepidoptera
- Superfamily: Noctuoidea
- Family: Erebidae
- Genus: Eulepidotis
- Species: E. modestula

Binomial name
- Eulepidotis modestula (Herrich-Schäffer, 1869)

Synonyms
- Palindia modestula Herrich-Schäffer, 1869; Eulepidotis modesta

Species of moth

Eulepidotis modestula is a moth of the family Erebidae first described by Gottlieb August Wilhelm Herrich-Schäffer in 1869. It is found on Saint Kitts, Dominica, Grenada, the Bahamas, Jamaica, Cuba, Puerto Rico, St. Croix, as well as in Ecuador.

The larvae feed on Ceiba pentandra.
