= Eulepidotis inclyta =

Scientific classification
- Domain: Eukaryota
- Kingdom: Animalia
- Phylum: Arthropoda
- Class: Insecta
- Order: Lepidoptera
- Superfamily: Noctuoidea
- Family: Erebidae
- Genus: Eulepidotis
- Species: E. inclyta

Binomial name
- Eulepidotis inclyta (Fabricius, 1775)

Synonyms
- Noctua inclyta Fabricius, 1775

Species of moth

Eulepidotis inclyta is a moth of the family Erebidae first described by Johan Christian Fabricius in 1775. It is found in the Neotropical realm, including Ecuador, Brazil and Honduras.
