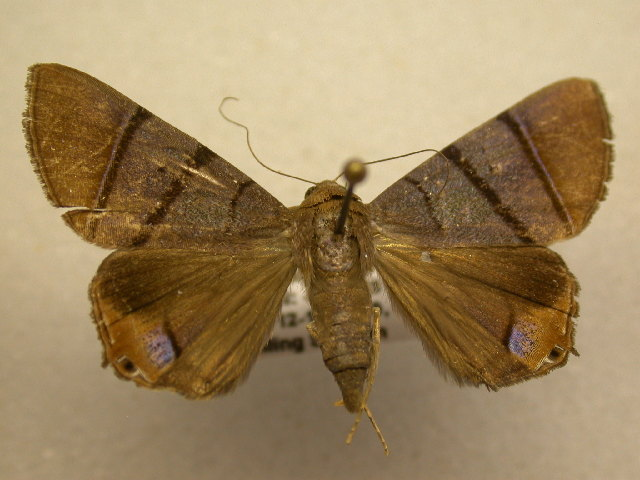

Scientific classification
- Kingdom: Animalia
- Phylum: Arthropoda
- Class: Insecta
- Order: Lepidoptera
- Superfamily: Noctuoidea
- Family: Erebidae
- Genus: Eulepidotis
- Species: E. superior

Binomial name
- Eulepidotis superior (Guenee, 1852)

Synonyms
- Palindia superior Guenée, 1852; Palindia deva Druce, 1889; Palindia dewitzii Möschler, 1890

= Eulepidotis superior =

Species of moth

Eulepidotis superior is a moth of the family Erebidae first described by Achille Guenée in 1852. It is found from Mexico to Panama and Venezuela, Colombia and Ecuador, as well as on Puerto Rico, Grenada and Saint Lucia.

The larvae feed on Quararibea asterolepis.
