= Eulepidotis columbrata =

Scientific classification
- Domain: Eukaryota
- Kingdom: Animalia
- Phylum: Arthropoda
- Class: Insecta
- Order: Lepidoptera
- Superfamily: Noctuoidea
- Family: Erebidae
- Genus: Eulepidotis
- Species: E. columbrata

Binomial name
- Eulepidotis columbrata Dyar, 1915

Species of moth

Eulepidotis columbrata is a moth of the family Erebidae first described by Harrison Gray Dyar Jr. in 1915. It is found in the Neotropics, including Mexico.
