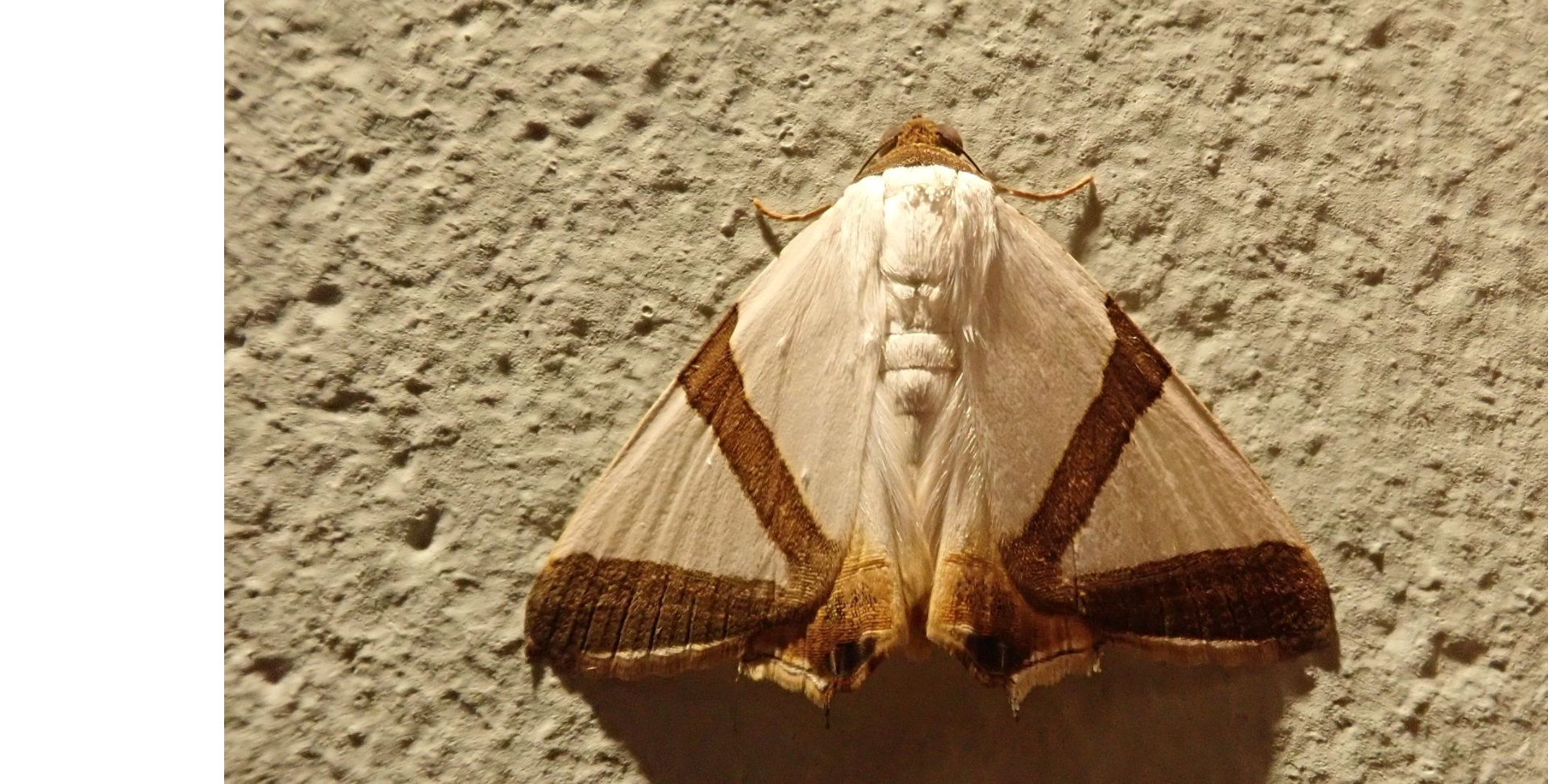

Scientific classification
- Kingdom: Animalia
- Phylum: Arthropoda
- Class: Insecta
- Order: Lepidoptera
- Superfamily: Noctuoidea
- Family: Erebidae
- Genus: Eulepidotis
- Species: E. santarema

Binomial name
- Eulepidotis santarema (Walker, 1865)

Synonyms
- Palindia santarema Walker, 1865

= Eulepidotis santarema =

Species of moth

Eulepidotis santarema is a moth of the family Erebidae first described by Francis Walker in 1865. It is found in the Neotropics, including the Brazilian state of Amazonas and Guyana.
