= Gerrit Wartenaar =

Dutch painter

Plate from De uitlandsche Kapellen

Gerrit Wartenaar (May 28, 1747 – June 6, 1803) was an 18th-century painter from the Dutch Republic.

He was born in Amsterdam as the son of the mapmaker Lambertus Wartenaar. In 1772, Gerrit married Maria Spekman, a woman fifteen years his elder who lived in his neighborhood, which was known as the Jordaan.

Wartenaar was the draughtsman for a natural history publication commissioned by Pieter Cramer and produced by Caspar Stoll. Cramer, the director of a scientific society in Zeeland, had assembled an extensive collection of colourful butterflies and moths (Lepidoptera) and arranged to publish the drawings, but died before the work was completed. When Cramer died during the preparations, Caspar Stoll took over the responsibility for the project. Between 1775 and 1782 four volumes appeared in Amsterdam of De uitlandsche Kapellen voorkomende in de drie Waereld-Deelen Asia, Africa en America - Papillons exotiques des trois parties du monde l'Asie, l'Afrique et l'Amerique. Every three months an issue was delivered, totalling 25 issues and the supplement. Two hundred and seventy people subscribed, who enjoyed some reduction.

The drawings are scientifically very accurate although somewhat stylized. Wartenaar positioned each specimen in a pleasing decorative arrangement, perhaps reflecting the position of specimens in the collector's cabinet of curiosities. As most of the insect specimens used by Cramer and Stoll to describe new species have long since perished, the original drawings now have a special scientific status as iconotypes.

Wartenaar lived all his life on Egelantiersgracht, and in 1781 he drew a map of his neighborhood. A childless widower when he died, he was buried in Westerkerk.
