= Eulepidotis caeruleilinea =

Scientific classification
- Kingdom: Animalia
- Phylum: Arthropoda
- Class: Insecta
- Order: Lepidoptera
- Superfamily: Noctuoidea
- Family: Erebidae
- Genus: Eulepidotis
- Species: E. caeruleilinea

Binomial name
- Eulepidotis caeruleilinea (Walker, 1858)

Synonyms
- Palindia caeruleilinea Walker, 1858; Palinda corineta Felder & Rogenhofer, 1874; Palinda lucia Bar, 1875

Species of moth

Eulepidotis caeruleilinea is a moth of the family Erebidae first described by Francis Walker in 1858. It is found in the Neotropical realm, including French Guiana, Costa Rica and the Brazilian states of Amazonas and Rio de Janeiro.
