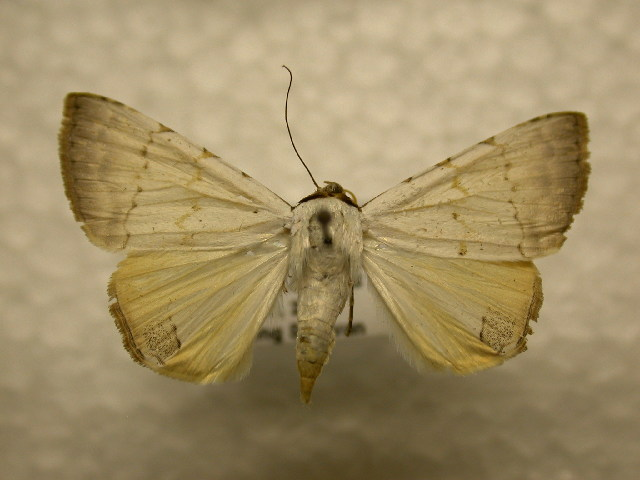

Scientific classification
- Kingdom: Animalia
- Phylum: Arthropoda
- Clade: Pancrustacea
- Class: Insecta
- Order: Lepidoptera
- Superfamily: Noctuoidea
- Family: Erebidae
- Genus: Eulepidotis
- Species: E. alabastraria

Binomial name
- Eulepidotis alabastraria Hübner, 1823

Synonyms
- Eulepidotis alabastria; Palindia punctangulata Walker, [1858]

= Eulepidotis alabastraria =

Species of moth

Eulepidotis alabastraria is a moth of the family Erebidae first described by Jacob Hübner in 1823. Many former members of the moth family Noctuidae are classified in the family Erebidae now, along with all of the former members of the families Arctiidae and Lymantriidae. This re-classification has not yet met with general consensus, and many resources and publications still follow the older classification scheme. It is found from the southern part of the United States to Central and South America.
