= Eulepidotis primulina =

Scientific classification
- Domain: Eukaryota
- Kingdom: Animalia
- Phylum: Arthropoda
- Class: Insecta
- Order: Lepidoptera
- Superfamily: Noctuoidea
- Family: Erebidae
- Genus: Eulepidotis
- Species: E. primulina

Binomial name
- Eulepidotis primulina (H. Druce, 1900)

Synonyms
- Palindia primulina H. Druce, 1900

Species of moth

Eulepidotis primulina is a moth of the family Erebidae first described by Herbert Druce in 1900. It is found in the Neotropics, including Colombia.
