= Eulepidotis albistriata =

Scientific classification
- Kingdom: Animalia
- Phylum: Arthropoda
- Class: Insecta
- Order: Lepidoptera
- Superfamily: Noctuoidea
- Family: Erebidae
- Genus: Eulepidotis
- Species: E. albistriata

Binomial name
- Eulepidotis albistriata Hampson, 1926

Species of moth

Eulepidotis albistriata is a moth of the family Erebidae first described by George Hampson in 1926. It is found in the Neotropical realm, including the Brazilian state of Amazonas.
