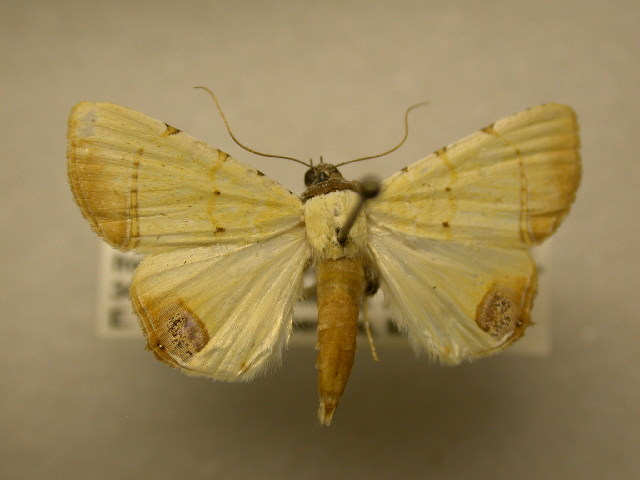

Scientific classification
- Domain: Eukaryota
- Kingdom: Animalia
- Phylum: Arthropoda
- Class: Insecta
- Order: Lepidoptera
- Superfamily: Noctuoidea
- Family: Erebidae
- Genus: Eulepidotis
- Species: E. micca

Binomial name
- Eulepidotis micca (H. Druce, 1889)

Synonyms
- Palindia micca H. Druce, 1889

= Eulepidotis micca =

Species of moth

Eulepidotis micca is a moth of the family Erebidae first described by Herbert Druce in 1889. It is found in the Neotropics, including Panama, Costa Rica and Ecuador. It was recorded from Texas by Ed Knudson and Charles Bordelon in 2004.
