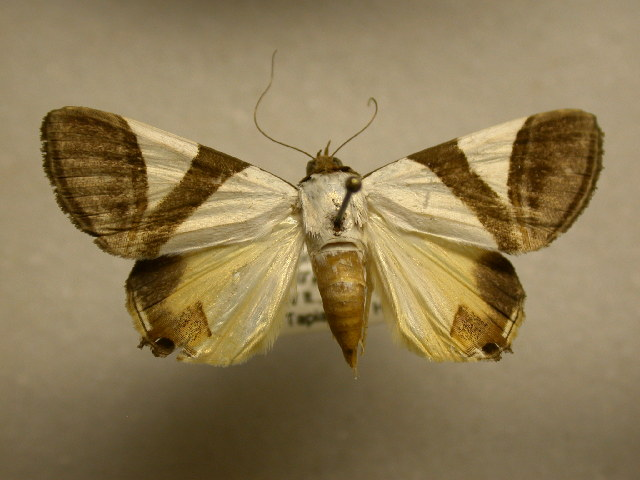

Scientific classification
- Kingdom: Animalia
- Phylum: Arthropoda
- Class: Insecta
- Order: Lepidoptera
- Superfamily: Noctuoidea
- Family: Erebidae
- Genus: Eulepidotis
- Species: E. dominicata

Binomial name
- Eulepidotis dominicata (Guenée, 1852)

Synonyms
- Palindia dominicata Guenée, 1852

= Eulepidotis dominicata =

Species of moth

Eulepidotis dominicata is a moth of the family Erebidae first described by Achille Guenée in 1852. It is found in the Neotropics, including Costa Rica, Brazil, Peru, Guyana and Ecuador. Reports from Texas and Florida are unconfirmed.
