= Eulepidotis detracta =

Scientific classification
- Kingdom: Animalia
- Phylum: Arthropoda
- Class: Insecta
- Order: Lepidoptera
- Superfamily: Noctuoidea
- Family: Erebidae
- Genus: Eulepidotis
- Species: E. detracta

Binomial name
- Eulepidotis detracta (Walker, [1858])

Synonyms
- Palindia detracta Walker, [1858]

Species of moth

Eulepidotis detracta is a moth of the family Erebidae first described by Francis Walker in 1858. It is found in the Neotropics, including Brazil.
