= Eulepidotis mesomphala =

Scientific classification
- Kingdom: Animalia
- Phylum: Arthropoda
- Class: Insecta
- Order: Lepidoptera
- Superfamily: Noctuoidea
- Family: Erebidae
- Genus: Eulepidotis
- Species: E. mesomphala

Binomial name
- Eulepidotis mesomphala Hampson, 1926

Species of moth

Eulepidotis mesomphala is a moth of the family Erebidae first described by George Hampson in 1926. It is found in the Neotropics, including the Brazilian states of Amazonas and Pará.
