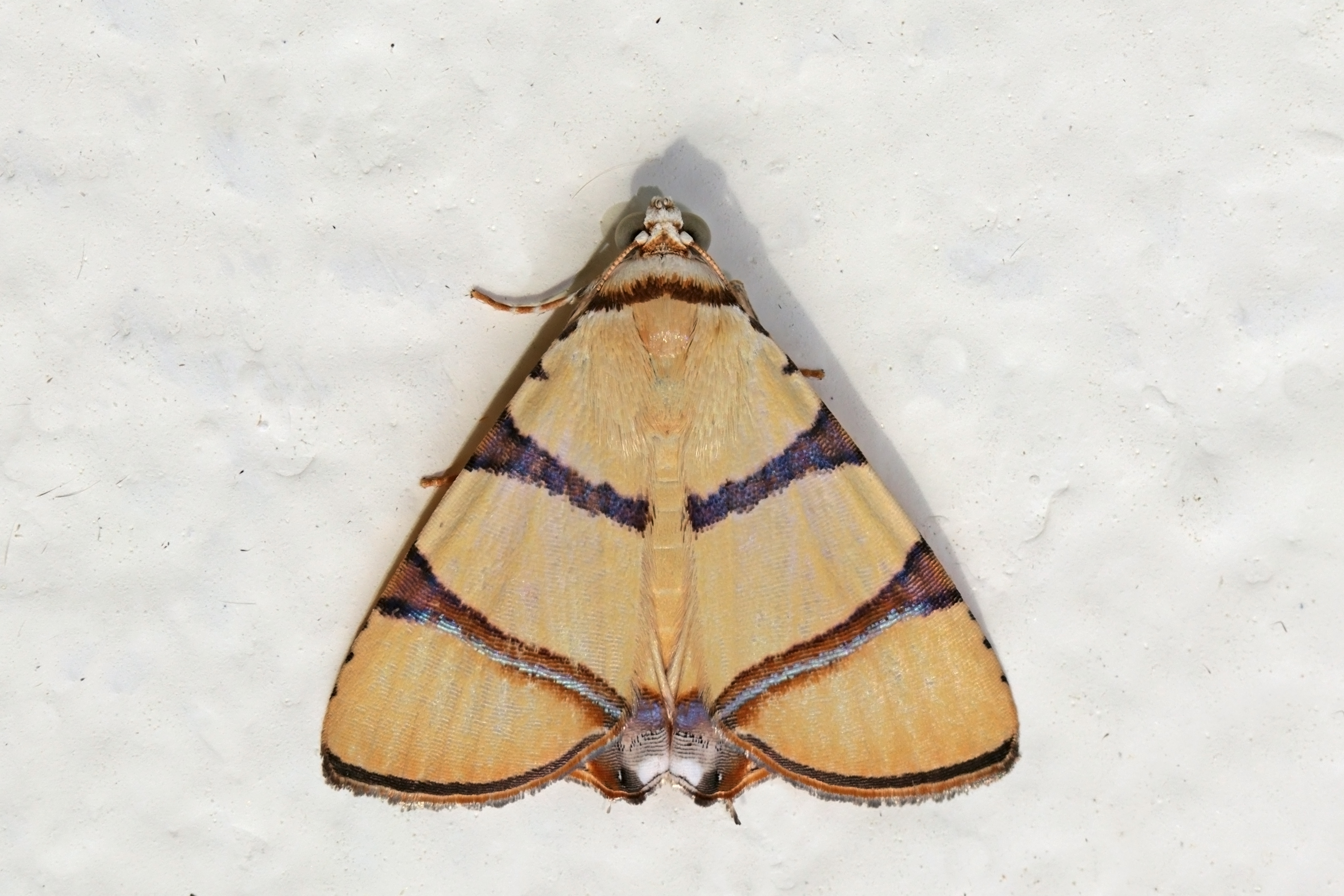
- Mount Totumas cloud forest, Panama

Scientific classification
- Domain: Eukaryota
- Kingdom: Animalia
- Phylum: Arthropoda
- Class: Insecta
- Order: Lepidoptera
- Superfamily: Noctuoidea
- Family: Erebidae
- Genus: Eulepidotis
- Species: E. affinis

Binomial name
- Eulepidotis affinis (Schaus, 1911)

Synonyms
- Palindia affinis Schaus, 1911

= Eulepidotis affinis =

Species of moth

Eulepidotis affinis is a moth of the family Erebidae. It is found in the neotropics, including Costa Rica, Panama and Ecuador.
