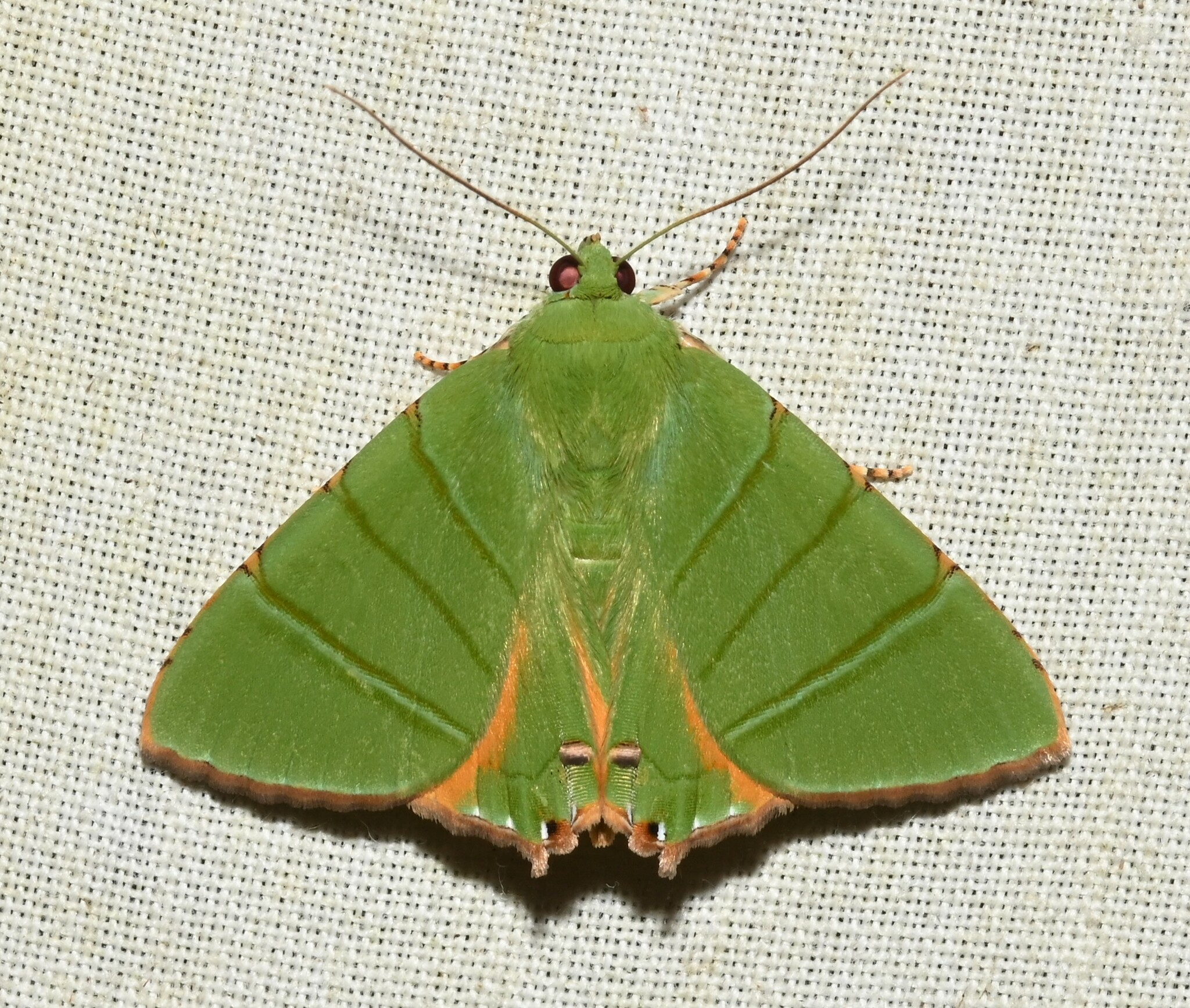

Scientific classification
- Kingdom: Animalia
- Phylum: Arthropoda
- Clade: Pancrustacea
- Class: Insecta
- Order: Lepidoptera
- Superfamily: Noctuoidea
- Family: Erebidae
- Genus: Eulepidotis
- Species: E. sylpha

Binomial name
- Eulepidotis sylpha Dyar, 1914

= Eulepidotis sylpha =

Species of moth

Eulepidotis sylpha is a species of moth in the family Erebidae. It was first described by Harrison Gray Dyar Jr. in 1914 and is found in the Neotropics, including Costa Rica and Mexico.
