= Eulepidotis hemithea =

Scientific classification
- Domain: Eukaryota
- Kingdom: Animalia
- Phylum: Arthropoda
- Class: Insecta
- Order: Lepidoptera
- Superfamily: Noctuoidea
- Family: Erebidae
- Genus: Eulepidotis
- Species: E. hemithea

Binomial name
- Eulepidotis hemithea (H. Druce, 1889)

Synonyms
- Calydia hemithea H. Druce, 1889

Species of moth

Eulepidotis hemithea is a moth of the family Erebidae first described by Herbert Druce in 1889. It is found in the Neotropics, including Panama and Guyana.
