= Eulepidotis tabasconis =

Scientific classification
- Domain: Eukaryota
- Kingdom: Animalia
- Phylum: Arthropoda
- Class: Insecta
- Order: Lepidoptera
- Superfamily: Noctuoidea
- Family: Erebidae
- Genus: Eulepidotis
- Species: E. tabasconis

Binomial name
- Eulepidotis tabasconis Hampson, 1926

Species of moth

Eulepidotis tabasconis is a moth of the family Erebidae first described by George Hampson in 1926. It is found in the Neotropics, including Mexico.
