= Eulepidotis caudatula =

Scientific classification
- Domain: Eukaryota
- Kingdom: Animalia
- Phylum: Arthropoda
- Class: Insecta
- Order: Lepidoptera
- Superfamily: Noctuoidea
- Family: Erebidae
- Genus: Eulepidotis
- Species: E. caudatula

Binomial name
- Eulepidotis caudatula (Herrich-Schäffer, [1854])

Synonyms
- Palindia caudatula Herrich-Schäffer, [1854]

Species of moth

Eulepidotis caudatula is a moth of the family Erebidae first described by Gottlieb August Wilhelm Herrich-Schäffer in 1854. It is found in the Neotropics, including Suriname.
