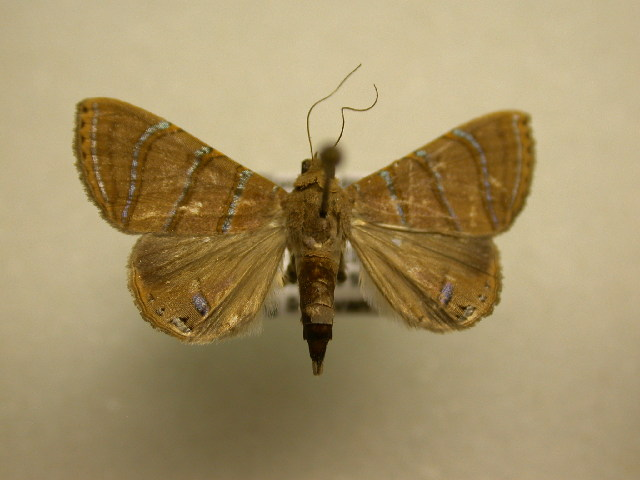

Scientific classification
- Kingdom: Animalia
- Phylum: Arthropoda
- Class: Insecta
- Order: Lepidoptera
- Superfamily: Noctuoidea
- Family: Erebidae
- Genus: Eulepidotis
- Species: E. juncida

Binomial name
- Eulepidotis juncida (Guenée, 1852)

Synonyms
- Palindia juncida Guenée, 1852; Palindia mabis Guenée, 1852; Palindia thecloides Walker, [1858]; Palindia aglaura Bar, 1876

= Eulepidotis juncida =

Species of moth

Eulepidotis juncida is a moth of the family Erebidae first described by Achille Guenée in 1852. It is found in the Neotropics, including Mexico, Honduras, Costa Rica, Peru, French Guiana, Venezuela, Bolivia and Colombia.

The larvae feed on Inga fagifolia.
