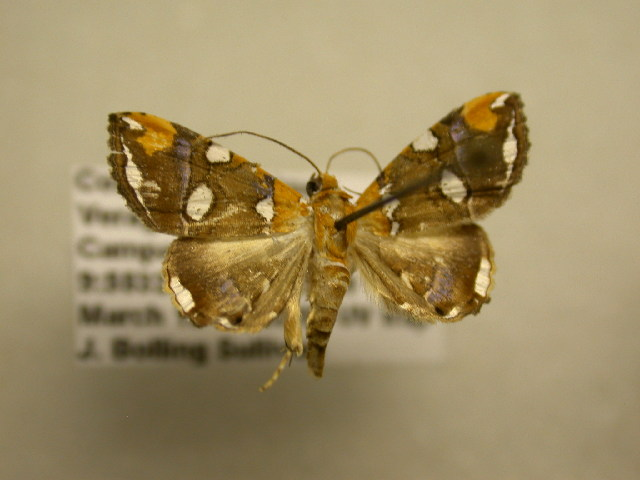

Scientific classification
- Domain: Eukaryota
- Kingdom: Animalia
- Phylum: Arthropoda
- Class: Insecta
- Order: Lepidoptera
- Superfamily: Noctuoidea
- Family: Erebidae
- Genus: Eulepidotis
- Species: E. guttata

Binomial name
- Eulepidotis guttata (Felder & Rogenhofer, 1874)

Synonyms
- Palinidia guttata Felder & Rogenhofer, 1874; Palinda micra Bar, 1876

= Eulepidotis guttata =

Species of moth

Eulepidotis guttata is a moth of the family Erebidae first described by Felder and Rogenhofer in 1874. It is found in the Neotropics, including Costa Rica, Peru, French Guiana, Guyana and the Brazilian state of Amazonas.
