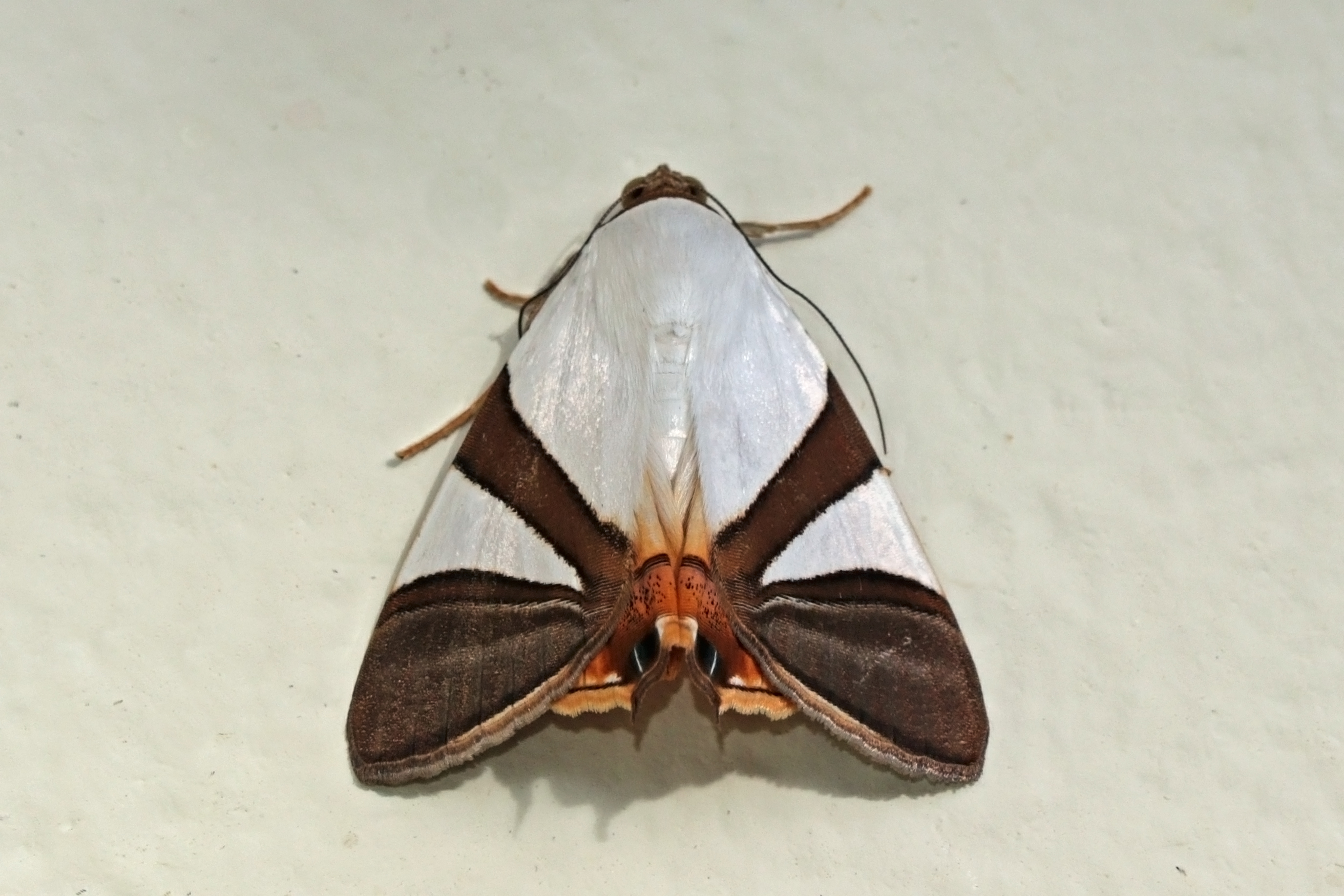
- Erebid moth (Eulepidotis electa)

Scientific classification
- Kingdom: Animalia
- Phylum: Arthropoda
- Class: Insecta
- Order: Lepidoptera
- Superfamily: Noctuoidea
- Family: Erebidae
- Genus: Eulepidotis
- Species: E. electa

Binomial name
- Eulepidotis electa Dyar, 1914

= Eulepidotis electa =

Species of moth

Eulepidotis electa is a moth of the family Erebidae first described by Harrison Gray Dyar Jr. in 1914. It is found in the Neotropics, including Costa Rica and Panama. It has recently been recorded from the US state of Arizona.
