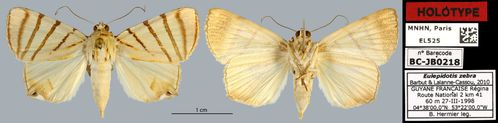

Scientific classification
- Domain: Eukaryota
- Kingdom: Animalia
- Phylum: Arthropoda
- Class: Insecta
- Order: Lepidoptera
- Superfamily: Noctuoidea
- Family: Erebidae
- Genus: Eulepidotis
- Species: E. zebra

Binomial name
- Eulepidotis zebra Barbut & Lalanne-Cassou, 2010

= Eulepidotis zebra =

Species of moth

Eulepidotis zebra is a moth of the family Erebidae first described by Jérôme Barbut and Bernard Lalanne-Cassou in 2010. It is found in the Neotropics, including Guyana.
