= Eulepidotis serpentifera =

Scientific classification
- Domain: Eukaryota
- Kingdom: Animalia
- Phylum: Arthropoda
- Class: Insecta
- Order: Lepidoptera
- Superfamily: Noctuoidea
- Family: Erebidae
- Genus: Eulepidotis
- Species: E. serpentifera

Binomial name
- Eulepidotis serpentifera (Brabant, 1909)

Synonyms
- Palindia serpentifera Brabant, 1909

Species of moth

Eulepidotis serpentifera is a moth of the family Erebidae first described by E. Brabant in 1909. It is found in the Neotropics, including French Guiana and Guyana.
