= Lepidomys proclea =

Scientific classification
- Domain: Eukaryota
- Kingdom: Animalia
- Phylum: Arthropoda
- Class: Insecta
- Order: Lepidoptera
- Family: Pyralidae
- Genus: Lepidomys
- Species: L. proclea

Binomial name
- Lepidomys proclea (H. Druce, 1895)

Synonyms
- Amblyura proclea H. Druce, 1895; Torda leucospilalis Hampson, 1895

Species of moth

Lepidomys proclea is a snout moth in the genus Lepidomys. The species was described by Herbert Druce in 1895, and is known from Mexico (including the type location of Teapa, Tabasco) and the West Indies.
