= Eulepidotis philosis =

Scientific classification
- Domain: Eukaryota
- Kingdom: Animalia
- Phylum: Arthropoda
- Class: Insecta
- Order: Lepidoptera
- Superfamily: Noctuoidea
- Family: Erebidae
- Genus: Eulepidotis
- Species: E. philosis

Binomial name
- Eulepidotis philosis Schaus, 1921

Species of moth

Eulepidotis philosis is a moth of the family Erebidae first described by William Schaus in 1921. It is found in the Neotropics, including Guatemala.
