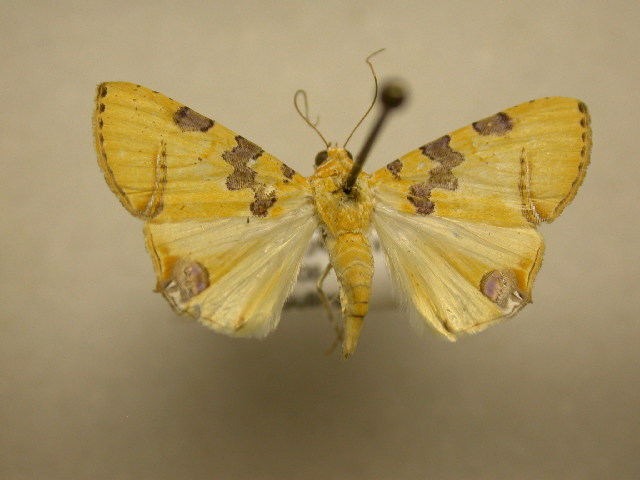

Scientific classification
- Domain: Eukaryota
- Kingdom: Animalia
- Phylum: Arthropoda
- Class: Insecta
- Order: Lepidoptera
- Superfamily: Noctuoidea
- Family: Erebidae
- Genus: Eulepidotis
- Species: E. hermura

Binomial name
- Eulepidotis hermura (Schaus, 1898)

Synonyms
- Palindia hermura Schaus, 1898; Eulepidotis hemura; Palindia evadens Druce, 1898

= Eulepidotis hermura =

Species of moth

Eulepidotis hermura is a moth of the family Erebidae first described by William Schaus in 1898. It is found in the Neotropics, including Mexico, Costa Rica, Honduras, Venezuela, Peru and Ecuador.
