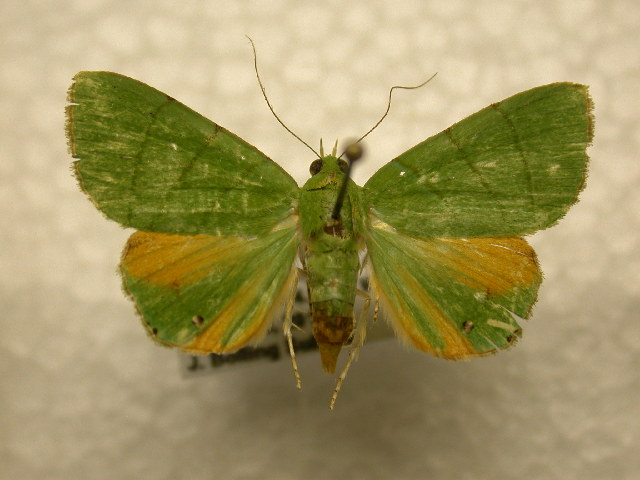

Scientific classification
- Domain: Eukaryota
- Kingdom: Animalia
- Phylum: Arthropoda
- Class: Insecta
- Order: Lepidoptera
- Superfamily: Noctuoidea
- Family: Erebidae
- Genus: Eulepidotis
- Species: E. folium

Binomial name
- Eulepidotis folium (Schaus, 1911)

Synonyms
- Palindia folium Schaus, 1911

= Eulepidotis folium =

Species of moth

Eulepidotis folium is a moth of the family Erebidae first described by William Schaus in 1911. It is found in the Neotropics, including Costa Rica.
