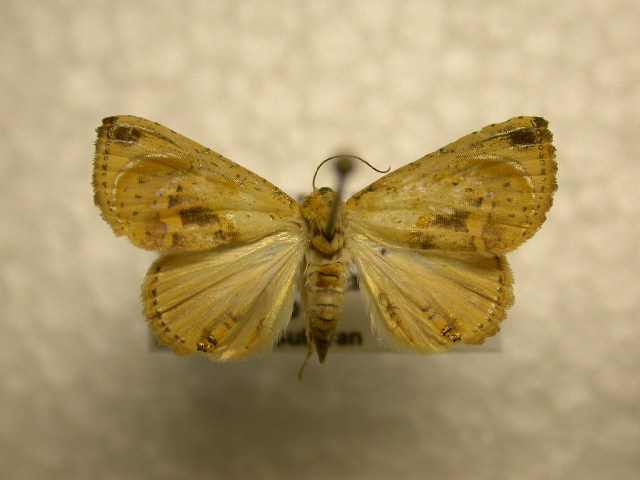

Scientific classification
- Domain: Eukaryota
- Kingdom: Animalia
- Phylum: Arthropoda
- Class: Insecta
- Order: Lepidoptera
- Superfamily: Noctuoidea
- Family: Erebidae
- Genus: Eulepidotis
- Species: E. metalligera

Binomial name
- Eulepidotis metalligera (Butler, 1879)

Synonyms
- Phrygionis metalligera Butler, 1879

= Eulepidotis metalligera =

Species of moth

Eulepidotis metalligera is a moth of the family Erebidae first described by Arthur Gardiner Butler in 1879. It is found in the Neotropics, including Costa Rica, Peru and the Brazilian state of Amazonas.
