= Eulepidotis mustela =

Scientific classification
- Domain: Eukaryota
- Kingdom: Animalia
- Phylum: Arthropoda
- Class: Insecta
- Order: Lepidoptera
- Superfamily: Noctuoidea
- Family: Erebidae
- Genus: Eulepidotis
- Species: E. mustela

Binomial name
- Eulepidotis mustela (H. Druce, 1889)

Synonyms
- Palindia mustela H. Druce, 1889

Species of moth

Eulepidotis mustela is a moth of the family Erebidae first described by Herbert Druce in 1889. It is found in the Neotropics, including Mexico.
