= Eulepidotis hemileuca =

Scientific classification
- Kingdom: Animalia
- Phylum: Arthropoda
- Class: Insecta
- Order: Lepidoptera
- Superfamily: Noctuoidea
- Family: Erebidae
- Genus: Eulepidotis
- Species: E. hemileuca

Binomial name
- Eulepidotis hemileuca (Guenée, 1852)

Synonyms
- Palindia hemileuca Guenée, 1852

Species of moth

Eulepidotis hemileuca is a moth of the family Erebidae first described by Achille Guenée in 1852. It is found in the Neotropics, including Brazil and Guyana.
