= Eulepidotis punctilinea =

Scientific classification
- Domain: Eukaryota
- Kingdom: Animalia
- Phylum: Arthropoda
- Class: Insecta
- Order: Lepidoptera
- Superfamily: Noctuoidea
- Family: Erebidae
- Genus: Eulepidotis
- Species: E. punctilinea

Binomial name
- Eulepidotis punctilinea Schaus, 1921

Species of moth

Eulepidotis punctilinea is a moth of the family Erebidae first described by William Schaus in 1921. It is found in the Neotropics, including Costa Rica, Honduras and Guatemala.
