= Lepidomys costipunctata =

Scientific classification
- Domain: Eukaryota
- Kingdom: Animalia
- Phylum: Arthropoda
- Class: Insecta
- Order: Lepidoptera
- Family: Pyralidae
- Genus: Lepidomys
- Species: L. costipunctata

Binomial name
- Lepidomys costipunctata Amsel, 1956

Species of moth

Lepidomys costipunctata is a species of snout moth in the genus Lepidomys. It was described by Hans Georg Amsel in 1956 and is known from Venezuela (including the type location of Maracay).
