= Eulepidotis austrina =

Scientific classification
- Domain: Eukaryota
- Kingdom: Animalia
- Phylum: Arthropoda
- Class: Insecta
- Order: Lepidoptera
- Superfamily: Noctuoidea
- Family: Erebidae
- Genus: Eulepidotis
- Species: E. austrina

Binomial name
- Eulepidotis austrina (Schaus, 1911)

Synonyms
- Palindia austrina Schaus, 1911

Species of moth

Eulepidotis austrina is a moth of the family Erebidae first described by William Schaus in 1911. It is found in the Neotropical realm, including Costa Rica.
