= Eulepidotis hebe =

Scientific classification
- Domain: Eukaryota
- Kingdom: Animalia
- Phylum: Arthropoda
- Class: Insecta
- Order: Lepidoptera
- Superfamily: Noctuoidea
- Family: Erebidae
- Genus: Eulepidotis
- Species: E. hebe

Binomial name
- Eulepidotis hebe (Möschler, 1890)

Synonyms
- Palindia hebe Möschler, 1890

Species of moth

Eulepidotis hebe is a moth of the family Erebidae first described by Heinrich Benno Möschler in 1890. It is found in the Neotropics, including Puerto Rico.
