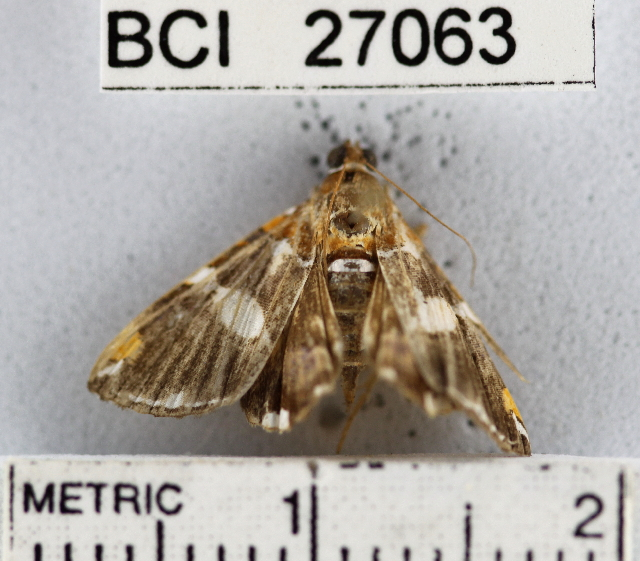

Scientific classification
- Kingdom: Animalia
- Phylum: Arthropoda
- Class: Insecta
- Order: Lepidoptera
- Superfamily: Noctuoidea
- Family: Erebidae
- Genus: Eulepidotis
- Species: E. perlata

Binomial name
- Eulepidotis perlata (Guenée, 1852)

Synonyms
- Palindia perlata Guenée, 1852; Palindia spectabilis Walker, 1858

= Eulepidotis perlata =

Species of moth

Eulepidotis perlata is a moth of the family Erebidae first described by Achille Guenée in 1852. It is found in the Neotropics, including Costa Rica, Panama, Peru, French Guiana and Guyana.
