= Eulepidotis striaepuncta =

Scientific classification
- Domain: Eukaryota
- Kingdom: Animalia
- Phylum: Arthropoda
- Class: Insecta
- Order: Lepidoptera
- Superfamily: Noctuoidea
- Family: Erebidae
- Genus: Eulepidotis
- Species: E. striaepuncta

Binomial name
- Eulepidotis striaepuncta (Herrich-Schäffer, 1868)

Synonyms
- Palindia striaepuncta Herrich-Schäffer, 1868; Palindia variablis Möschler, 1890; Palindia variabilis var. obscura Möschler, 1890

Species of moth

Eulepidotis striaepuncta is a moth of the family Erebidae first described by Gottlieb August Wilhelm Herrich-Schäffer in 1868. It is found in the Neotropics, including Cuba and Puerto Rico.
