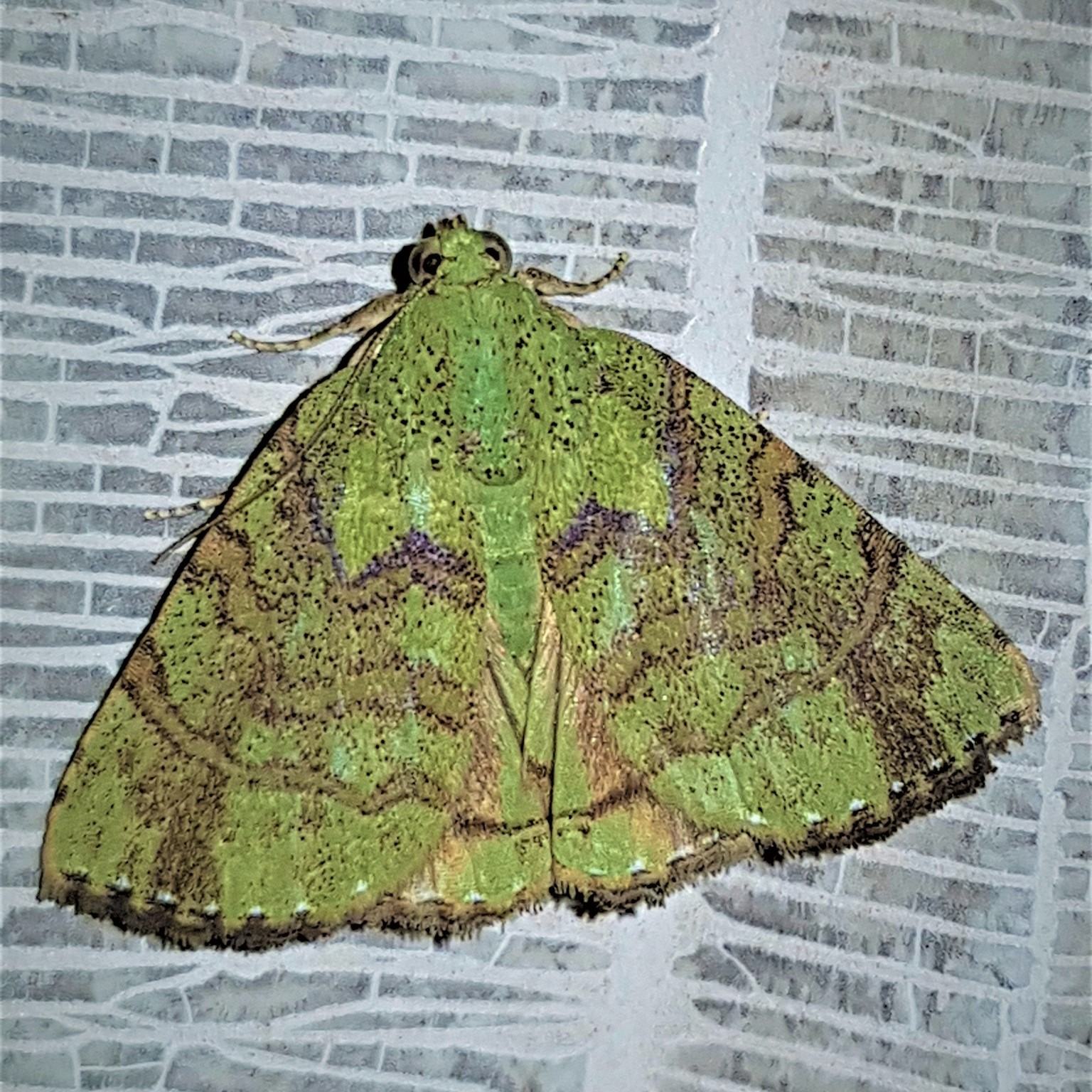

Scientific classification
- Kingdom: Animalia
- Phylum: Arthropoda
- Clade: Pancrustacea
- Class: Insecta
- Order: Lepidoptera
- Superfamily: Noctuoidea
- Family: Erebidae
- Genus: Eulepidotis
- Species: E. erina

Binomial name
- Eulepidotis erina Dyar, 1914

= Eulepidotis erina =

Species of moth

Eulepidotis erina is a species of moth in the family Erebidae. It was first described by Harrison Gray Dyar Jr. in 1914. It is found in the Neotropics, including French Guiana and Guyana.
