= Eulepidotis fortissima =

Scientific classification
- Kingdom: Animalia
- Phylum: Arthropoda
- Clade: Pancrustacea
- Class: Insecta
- Order: Lepidoptera
- Superfamily: Noctuoidea
- Family: Erebidae
- Genus: Eulepidotis
- Species: E. fortissima

Binomial name
- Eulepidotis fortissima Dyar, 1914

Synonyms
- Eulepidotis fantissima

Species of moth

Eulepidotis fortissima is a moth of the family Erebidae first described by Harrison Gray Dyar Jr. in 1914. It is found in the Neotropics, including Ecuador, Guyana and the Brazilian state of Rio de Janeiro.
