= Eulepidotis teligera =

Scientific classification
- Domain: Eukaryota
- Kingdom: Animalia
- Phylum: Arthropoda
- Class: Insecta
- Order: Lepidoptera
- Superfamily: Noctuoidea
- Family: Erebidae
- Genus: Eulepidotis
- Species: E. teligera

Binomial name
- Eulepidotis teligera (Brabant, 1910)

Synonyms
- Palindia teligera Brabant, 1910; Palindia vivida Dognin, 1912

Species of moth

Eulepidotis teligera is a moth of the family Erebidae first described by E. Brabant in 1910. It is found in the Neotropics, including Peru, Venezuela and Paraguay.
