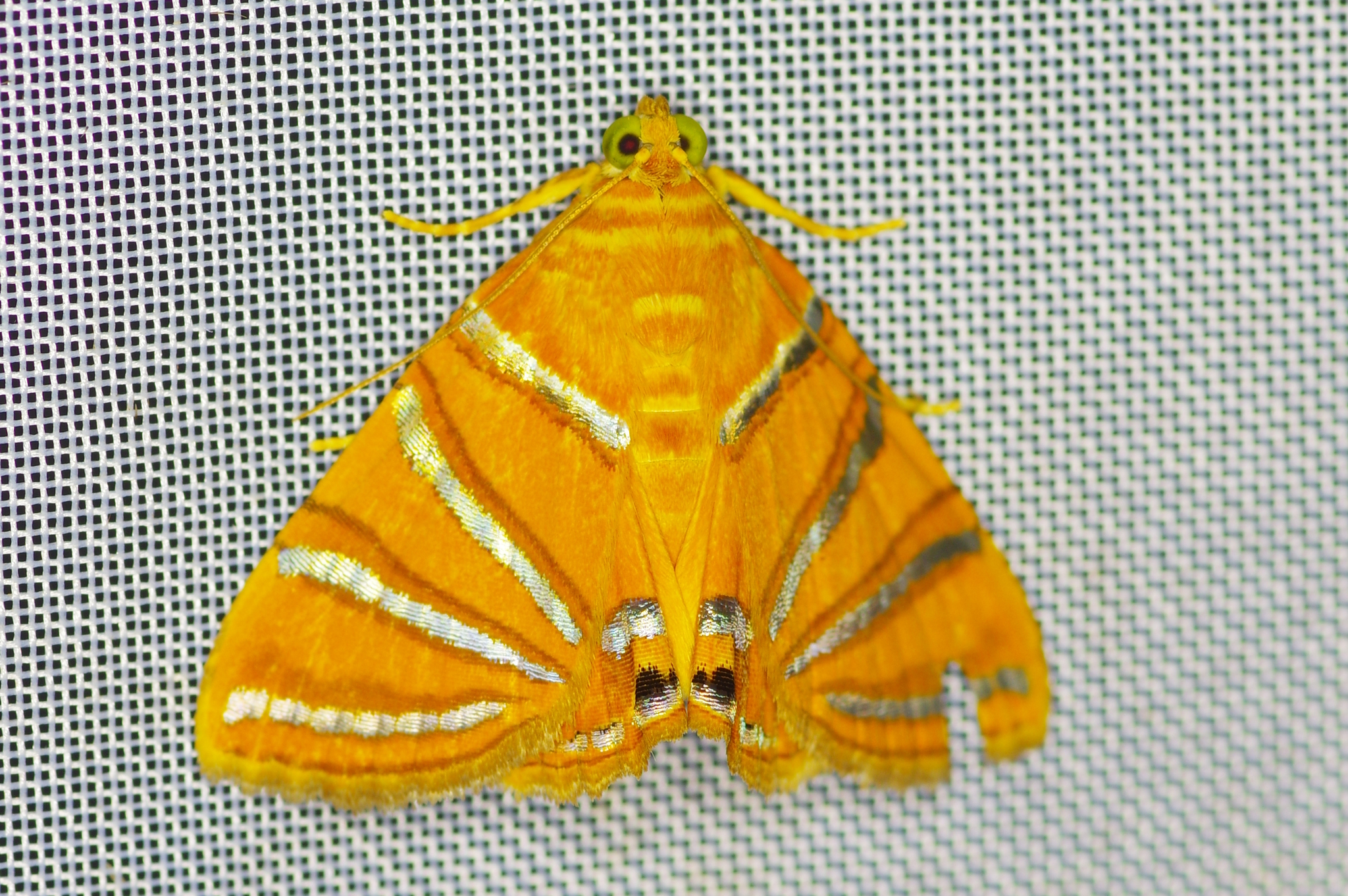

Scientific classification
- Domain: Eukaryota
- Kingdom: Animalia
- Phylum: Arthropoda
- Class: Insecta
- Order: Lepidoptera
- Superfamily: Noctuoidea
- Family: Erebidae
- Genus: Eulepidotis
- Species: E. crocoptera

Binomial name
- Eulepidotis crocoptera (Felder & Rogenhofer, 1874)

Synonyms
- Palindia crocoptera Felder & Rogenhofer, 1874

= Eulepidotis crocoptera =

Species of moth

Eulepidotis crocoptera is a species of moth in the family Erebidae that was first described by Felder and Rogenhofer in 1874. It is found in the Neotropical realm, including French Guiana and Guyana.
