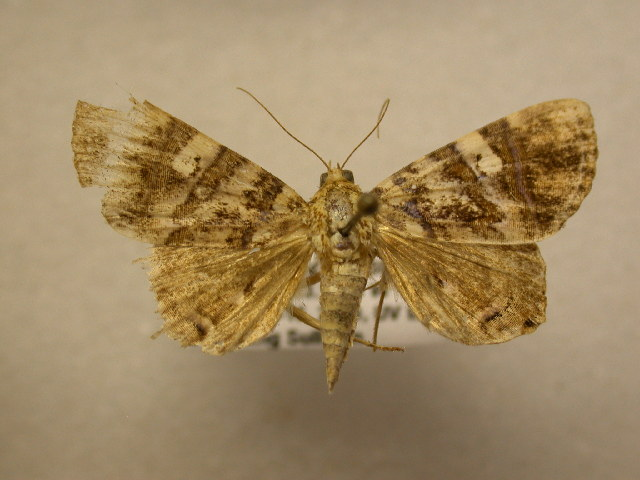

Scientific classification
- Domain: Eukaryota
- Kingdom: Animalia
- Phylum: Arthropoda
- Class: Insecta
- Order: Lepidoptera
- Superfamily: Noctuoidea
- Family: Erebidae
- Genus: Eulepidotis
- Species: E. delecta

Binomial name
- Eulepidotis delecta (Schaus, 1911)

Synonyms
- Palindia delecta Schaus, 1911

= Eulepidotis delecta =

Species of moth

Eulepidotis delecta is a moth of the family Erebidae first described by William Schaus in 1911. It is found in the Neotropics, including Costa Rica.
