= Eulepidotis argentilinea =

Scientific classification
- Domain: Eukaryota
- Kingdom: Animalia
- Phylum: Arthropoda
- Class: Insecta
- Order: Lepidoptera
- Superfamily: Noctuoidea
- Family: Erebidae
- Genus: Eulepidotis
- Species: E. argentilinea

Binomial name
- Eulepidotis argentilinea (Schaus, 1906)

Synonyms
- Palinidia argentilinea Schaus, 1906

Species of moth

Eulepidotis argentilinea is a moth of the family Erebidae first described by William Schaus in 1906. It is found in the Neotropical realm, including the Brazilian state of Rio de Janeiro.
