= Eulepidotis geminata =

Scientific classification
- Kingdom: Animalia
- Phylum: Arthropoda
- Clade: Pancrustacea
- Class: Insecta
- Order: Lepidoptera
- Superfamily: Noctuoidea
- Family: Erebidae
- Genus: Eulepidotis
- Species: E. geminata

Binomial name
- Eulepidotis geminata (Packard, 1869)

Synonyms
- Palindia geminata Packard, 1869; Palindia regina Druce, 1889

Species of moth

Eulepidotis geminata is a moth of the family Erebidae first described by Alpheus Spring Packard in 1869. It is found in the Neotropics, including Ecuador.
