= Lepidomys bilinealis =

Scientific classification
- Kingdom: Animalia
- Phylum: Arthropoda
- Class: Insecta
- Order: Lepidoptera
- Family: Pyralidae
- Genus: Lepidomys
- Species: L. bilinealis

Binomial name
- Lepidomys bilinealis Dyar, 1914

Species of moth

Lepidomys bilinealis is a species of snout moth in the genus Lepidomys. It was described by Harrison Gray Dyar Jr. in 1914, and is known from Panama.
