= Eulepidotis colleti =

Scientific classification
- Domain: Eukaryota
- Kingdom: Animalia
- Phylum: Arthropoda
- Class: Insecta
- Order: Lepidoptera
- Superfamily: Noctuoidea
- Family: Erebidae
- Genus: Eulepidotis
- Species: E. colleti

Binomial name
- Eulepidotis colleti Barbut & Lalanne-Cassou, 2011

Species of moth

Eulepidotis colleti is a moth of the family Erebidae first described by Jérôme Barbut and Bernard Lalanne-Cassou in 2011. It is found in the Neotropics, including French Guiana.
