= Eulepidotis bipartita =

Scientific classification
- Domain: Eukaryota
- Kingdom: Animalia
- Phylum: Arthropoda
- Class: Insecta
- Order: Lepidoptera
- Superfamily: Noctuoidea
- Family: Erebidae
- Genus: Eulepidotis
- Species: E. bipartita

Binomial name
- Eulepidotis bipartita (Dognin, 1914)

Synonyms
- Palindia bipartita Dognin, 1914

Species of moth

Eulepidotis bipartita is a moth of the family Erebidae first described by Paul Dognin in 1914. It is found in the Neotropical realm, including Peru.
