= Eulepidotis merricki =

Scientific classification
- Domain: Eukaryota
- Kingdom: Animalia
- Phylum: Arthropoda
- Class: Insecta
- Order: Lepidoptera
- Superfamily: Noctuoidea
- Family: Erebidae
- Genus: Eulepidotis
- Species: E. merricki

Binomial name
- Eulepidotis merricki (Holland, 1902)

Synonyms
- Palindia merricki Holland, 1902; Eulepidotis merrici

Species of moth

Eulepidotis merricki is a moth of the family Erebidae first described by William Jacob Holland in 1902. It is found in Jamaica, Cuba, and Puerto Rico. The species was originally described after being observed in the US state of Pennsylvania, but the specimen was probably imported with tropical fruit. The species is not present in the Nearctic.

The larvae feed on Melicoccus bijugatus
