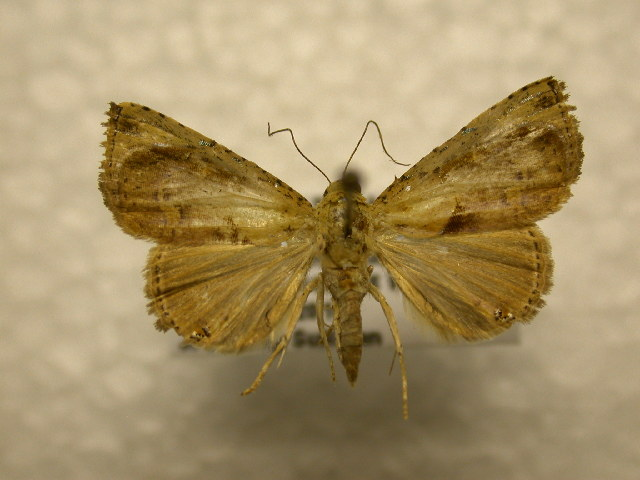

Scientific classification
- Kingdom: Animalia
- Phylum: Arthropoda
- Clade: Pancrustacea
- Class: Insecta
- Order: Lepidoptera
- Superfamily: Noctuoidea
- Family: Erebidae
- Genus: Eulepidotis
- Species: E. ornatoides

Binomial name
- Eulepidotis ornatoides Poole, 1989

Synonyms
- Calydia ornata Dognin, 1910 (preocc. Palindia ornata Bar, 1876)

= Eulepidotis ornatoides =

Species of moth

Eulepidotis ornatoides is a moth of the family Erebidae first described by Robert W. Poole in 1989. It is found in the Neotropics, including Costa Rica and Bolivia.
