= Eulepidotis crocota =

Scientific classification
- Kingdom: Animalia
- Phylum: Arthropoda
- Class: Insecta
- Order: Lepidoptera
- Superfamily: Noctuoidea
- Family: Erebidae
- Genus: Eulepidotis
- Species: E. crocota

Binomial name
- Eulepidotis crocota Hampson, 1926

Species of moth

Eulepidotis crocota is a moth of the family Erebidae first described by George Hampson in 1926. It is found in the Neotropics, including Guyana and the Brazilian state of São Paulo.
