= Eulepidotis scita =

Scientific classification
- Kingdom: Animalia
- Phylum: Arthropoda
- Class: Insecta
- Order: Lepidoptera
- Superfamily: Noctuoidea
- Family: Erebidae
- Genus: Eulepidotis
- Species: E. scita

Binomial name
- Eulepidotis scita (Walker, 1869)

Synonyms
- Palindia scita Walker, 1869

Species of moth

Eulepidotis scita is a moth of the family Erebidae first described by Francis Walker in 1869. It is found in the Neotropics.
