= Eulepidotis reducens =

Scientific classification
- Kingdom: Animalia
- Phylum: Arthropoda
- Class: Insecta
- Order: Lepidoptera
- Superfamily: Noctuoidea
- Family: Erebidae
- Genus: Eulepidotis
- Species: E. reducens

Binomial name
- Eulepidotis reducens Dyar, 1914

Synonyms
- Eulepidotis recudens

Species of moth

Eulepidotis reducens is a moth of the family Erebidae first described by Harrison Gray Dyar Jr. in 1914. It is found in the Neotropics, including Venezuela.
