= Eulepidotis deiliniaria =

Scientific classification
- Kingdom: Animalia
- Phylum: Arthropoda
- Class: Insecta
- Order: Lepidoptera
- Superfamily: Noctuoidea
- Family: Erebidae
- Genus: Eulepidotis
- Species: E. deiliniaria

Binomial name
- Eulepidotis deiliniaria Hampson, 1926

Species of moth

Eulepidotis deiliniaria is a moth of the family Erebidae. It is found in the Neotropical realm, including Mexico. It was first described by George Hampson in 1926.
