= Eulepidotis perducens =

Scientific classification
- Kingdom: Animalia
- Phylum: Arthropoda
- Class: Insecta
- Order: Lepidoptera
- Superfamily: Noctuoidea
- Family: Erebidae
- Genus: Eulepidotis
- Species: E. perducens

Binomial name
- Eulepidotis perducens (Walker, 1858)

Synonyms
- Palindia perducens Walker, 1858

Species of moth

Eulepidotis perducens is a moth of the family Erebidae first described by Francis Walker in 1858. It is found in the Neotropics, including Jamaica and Guyana.
