= Eulepidotis addens =

Scientific classification
- Kingdom: Animalia
- Phylum: Arthropoda
- Clade: Pancrustacea
- Class: Insecta
- Order: Lepidoptera
- Superfamily: Noctuoidea
- Family: Erebidae
- Genus: Eulepidotis
- Species: E. addens

Binomial name
- Eulepidotis addens (Walker, 1858)

Synonyms
- Palindia addens Walker, 1858

Species of moth

Eulepidotis addens is a moth of the family Erebidae first described by Francis Walker in 1858. It is found in Saint Kitts, Montserrat, Dominica, Saint Lucia, Saint Vincent, Jamaica, Hispaniola, Puerto Rico, Mexico, Guatemala, Venezuela and Brazil. It was reported from Texas by Ed Knudson and Charles Bordelon in 2004.

The larvae feed on Inga vera.
