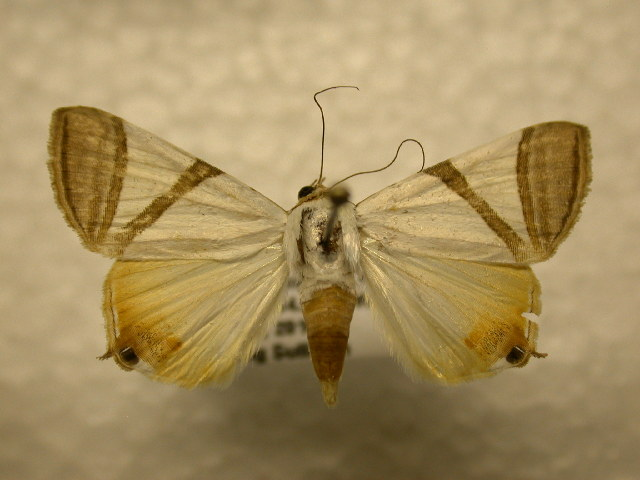

Scientific classification
- Kingdom: Animalia
- Phylum: Arthropoda
- Class: Insecta
- Order: Lepidoptera
- Superfamily: Noctuoidea
- Family: Erebidae
- Genus: Eulepidotis
- Species: E. persimilis

Binomial name
- Eulepidotis persimilis (Guenée, 1852)

Synonyms
- Palindia persimilis Guenée, 1852

= Eulepidotis persimilis =

Species of moth

Eulepidotis persimilis is a moth of the family Erebidae first described by Achille Guenée in 1852. It is found in the Neotropics, including Brazil, Costa Rica and Honduras.
