= Eulepidotis albidus =

Scientific classification
- Domain: Eukaryota
- Kingdom: Animalia
- Phylum: Arthropoda
- Class: Insecta
- Order: Lepidoptera
- Superfamily: Noctuoidea
- Family: Erebidae
- Genus: Eulepidotis
- Species: E. albidus

Binomial name
- Eulepidotis albidus (Blanchard, 1852)

Synonyms
- Peropalpus albidus Blanchard, 1852

Species of moth

Eulepidotis albidus is a moth of the family Erebidae first described by Émile Blanchard in 1852. It is found in the Neotropical realm, including Chile.
