= Eulepidotis norduca =

Scientific classification
- Domain: Eukaryota
- Kingdom: Animalia
- Phylum: Arthropoda
- Class: Insecta
- Order: Lepidoptera
- Superfamily: Noctuoidea
- Family: Erebidae
- Genus: Eulepidotis
- Species: E. norduca

Binomial name
- Eulepidotis norduca (Schaus, 1901)

Synonyms
- Calydia norduca Schaus, 1901

Species of moth

Eulepidotis norduca is a moth of the family Erebidae first described by William Schaus in 1901. It is found in the Neotropics, including Mexico.
