= Eulepidotis aglae =

Scientific classification
- Domain: Eukaryota
- Kingdom: Animalia
- Phylum: Arthropoda
- Class: Insecta
- Order: Lepidoptera
- Superfamily: Noctuoidea
- Family: Erebidae
- Genus: Eulepidotis
- Species: E. aglae

Binomial name
- Eulepidotis aglae Schaus, 1921

Species of moth

Eulepidotis aglae is a moth of the family Erebidae first described by William Schaus in 1921. It is found in the Neotropics, including Guatemala.

The wingspan is about 32 mm. The head, collar, thorax, and two basal segments of the abdomen are reddish brown. The abdomen is otherwise dull brown above and grayish brown underneath. The forewings are reddish brown with three steel blue lines running from the costa to the inner margin. The hindwings have a fuscous costal margin up to vein 6, it is otherwise reddish brown except for the base.
