= Eulepidotis argyritis =

Scientific classification
- Domain: Eukaryota
- Kingdom: Animalia
- Phylum: Arthropoda
- Class: Insecta
- Order: Lepidoptera
- Superfamily: Noctuoidea
- Family: Erebidae
- Genus: Eulepidotis
- Species: E. argyritis

Binomial name
- Eulepidotis argyritis Butler, 1879

Species of moth

Eulepidotis argyritis is a moth of the family Erebidae first described by Arthur Gardiner Butler in 1879. It is found in the Neotropical realm, including the Brazilian state of Amazonas.
