= Lepidomys =

Scientific classification
- Kingdom: Animalia
- Phylum: Arthropoda
- Clade: Pancrustacea
- Class: Insecta
- Order: Lepidoptera
- Family: Pyralidae
- Subfamily: Chrysauginae
- Genus: Lepidomys; Guenée, 1852

Synonyms
- Chalinitis Ragonot, 1891

Genus of moths

Lepidomys is a genus of snout moths. It was described by Achille Guenée in 1852.

== Species ==
- Lepidomys bilinealis Dyar, 1914
- Lepidomys cecropia (Druce, 1895)
- Lepidomys costipunctata Amsel, 1956
- Lepidomys irrenosa Guenée, 1852
- Lepidomys proclea (Druce, 1895)
