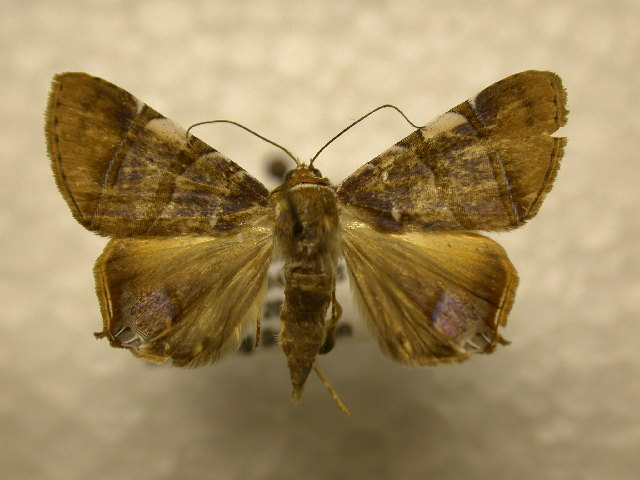

Scientific classification
- Domain: Eukaryota
- Kingdom: Animalia
- Phylum: Arthropoda
- Class: Insecta
- Order: Lepidoptera
- Superfamily: Noctuoidea
- Family: Erebidae
- Genus: Eulepidotis
- Species: E. ezra

Binomial name
- Eulepidotis ezra (H. Druce, 1898)

Synonyms
- Palindia ezra H. Druce, 1898

= Eulepidotis ezra =

Species of moth

Eulepidotis ezra is a moth of the family Erebidae first described by Herbert Druce in 1898. It is found in the Neotropics, including Mexico and Costa Rica.
