= Eulepidotis albata =

Scientific classification
- Domain: Eukaryota
- Kingdom: Animalia
- Phylum: Arthropoda
- Class: Insecta
- Order: Lepidoptera
- Superfamily: Noctuoidea
- Family: Erebidae
- Genus: Eulepidotis
- Species: E. albata

Binomial name
- Eulepidotis albata (Felder & Rogenhofer, 1874)

Synonyms
- Palindia albata Felder & Rogenhofer, 1874; Palindia magdalensis Bar, 1876

Species of moth

Eulepidotis albata is a moth of the family Erebidae first described by Felder and Rogenhofer in 1874. It is found in the Neotropical realm, including Brazil, French Guiana and Guyana.
