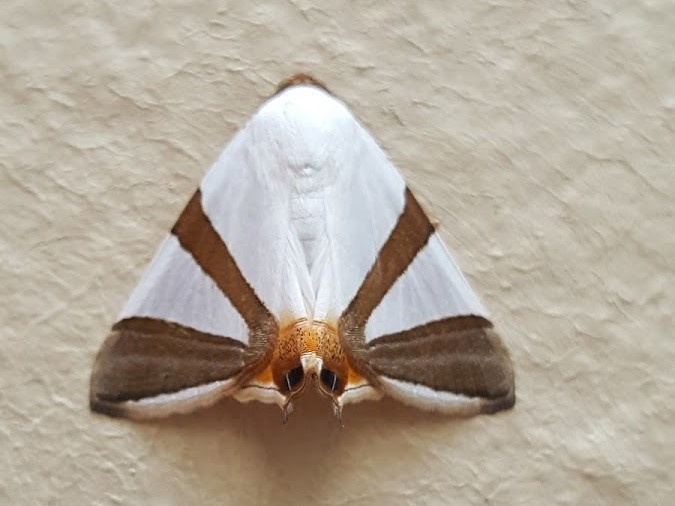

Scientific classification
- Kingdom: Animalia
- Phylum: Arthropoda
- Class: Insecta
- Order: Lepidoptera
- Superfamily: Noctuoidea
- Family: Erebidae
- Genus: Eulepidotis
- Species: E. rectimargo

Binomial name
- Eulepidotis rectimargo (Guenée, 1852)

Synonyms
- Palindia rectimargo Guenée, 1852

= Eulepidotis rectimargo =

Species of moth

Eulepidotis rectimargo is a moth of the family Erebidae first described by Achille Guenée in 1852. It is found in the tropics of the Western Hemisphere, including Mexico, Costa Rica, Guyana, Peru, Uruguay and Argentina. It was recorded from Texas by Ed Knudson and Charles Bordelon in 2004.
