= Eulepidotis suzetta =

Scientific classification
- Domain: Eukaryota
- Kingdom: Animalia
- Phylum: Arthropoda
- Class: Insecta
- Order: Lepidoptera
- Superfamily: Noctuoidea
- Family: Erebidae
- Genus: Eulepidotis
- Species: E. suzetta

Binomial name
- Eulepidotis suzetta Dyar, 1914

Species of moth

Eulepidotis suzetta is a moth of the family Erebidae first described by Harrison Gray Dyar Jr. in 1914. It is found in the Neotropics, including French Guiana and Guyana.
