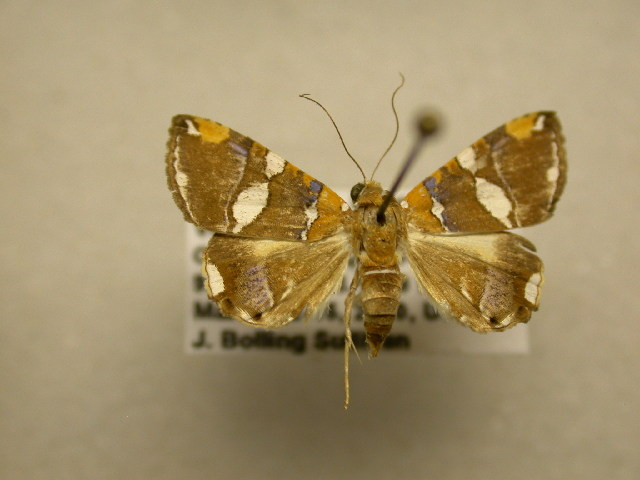

Scientific classification
- Kingdom: Animalia
- Phylum: Arthropoda
- Class: Insecta
- Order: Lepidoptera
- Superfamily: Noctuoidea
- Family: Erebidae
- Genus: Eulepidotis
- Species: E. ouocco

Binomial name
- Eulepidotis ouocco Dyar, 1914

= Eulepidotis ouocco =

Species of moth

Eulepidotis ouocco is a moth of the family Erebidae first described by Harrison Gray Dyar Jr. in 1914. It is found in the Neotropics, including Costa Rica, French Guiana and Guyana.
