= Lepidomys cecropia =

Scientific classification
- Domain: Eukaryota
- Kingdom: Animalia
- Phylum: Arthropoda
- Class: Insecta
- Order: Lepidoptera
- Family: Pyralidae
- Genus: Lepidomys
- Species: L. cecropia

Binomial name
- Lepidomys cecropia (H. Druce, 1895)

Synonyms
- Amblyura cecropia H. Druce, 1895

Species of moth

Lepidomys cecropia is a species of snout moth in the genus Lepidomys. It was described by Herbert Druce in 1895, and is known from Mexico (including the type location Atoyac, Veracruz) and Guatemala.
