= Edward L. Todd =

American entomologist

- Born: 1922; Eureka, Kansas
- Died: 1986 (aged 63–64)
- Education: University of Kansas
- Scientific career
- Fields: Entomology
- Workplaces: CDC, USDA

Edward Lawrence Todd (1922–1986) was an American research entomologist, specializing in the taxonomy and systematics of Lepidoptera (Noctuidae), and Hemiptera (Gelastocoridae).

== Biography ==
Todd was born in Eureka, Kansas, and did his undergraduate and graduate studies at the University of Kansas, earning an M.A. in entomology in 1948 and a Ph.D. in 1950.

He worked as an entomologist from 1951 to 1952, for the Communicable Disease Center of the United States Public Health Service, in Georgia. He then became a research entomologist at the National Museum of Natural History, employed by the United States Department of Agriculture's Division of Insect Identification (renamed in 1972 as the Systematic Entomology Laboratory), until his retirement in 1979.
