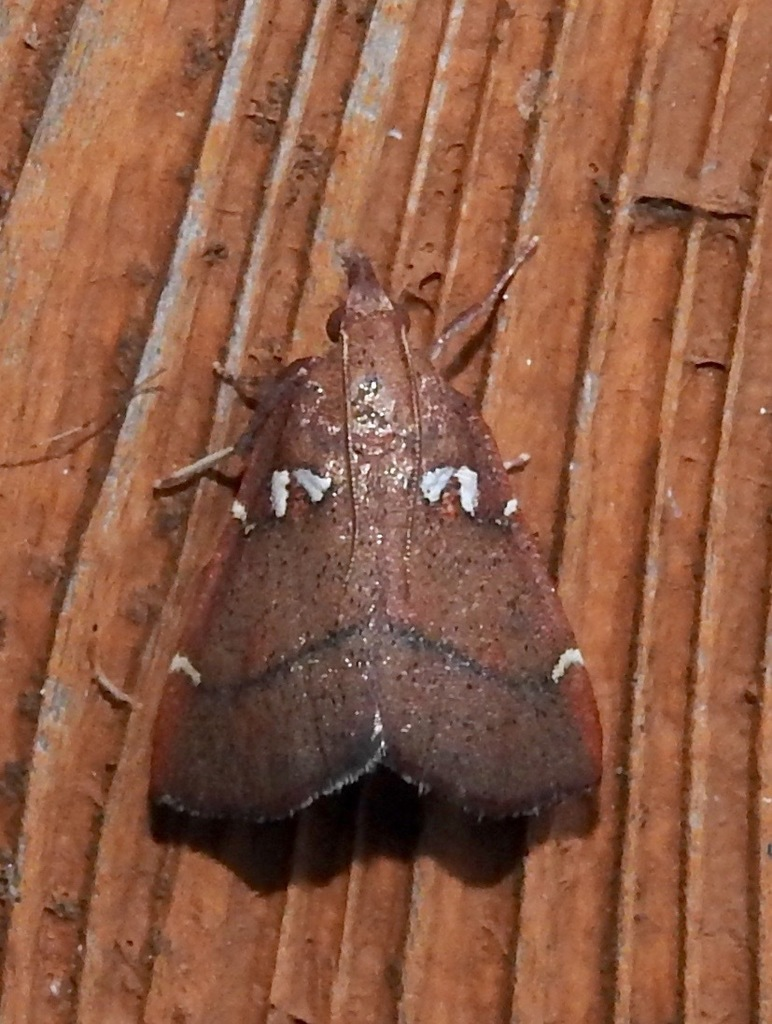

Scientific classification
- Kingdom: Animalia
- Phylum: Arthropoda
- Class: Insecta
- Order: Lepidoptera
- Family: Pyralidae
- Genus: Lepidomys
- Species: L. irrenosa

Binomial name
- Lepidomys irrenosa Guenée, 1852

Synonyms
- Chalinitis olealis Ragonot, 1891; Palindia reflexa Herrich-Schäffer, 1869

= Lepidomys irrenosa =

Species of moth

Lepidomys irrenosa is a species of snout moth in the genus Lepidomys. It was described by Achille Guenée in 1852 and is known from the United States, including Florida, Georgia and South Carolina. It is also found on Cuba.
