= Eupithecia formosa =

Scientific classification
- Kingdom: Animalia
- Phylum: Arthropoda
- Clade: Pancrustacea
- Class: Insecta
- Order: Lepidoptera
- Family: Geometridae
- Genus: Eupithecia
- Species: E. formosa

Binomial name
- Eupithecia formosa (Vojnits & Laever, 1973)

Synonyms
- Catarina formosa Vojnits & Laever, 1973

Species of moth

Eupithecia formosa is a moth in the family Geometridae. It is found in China (Yunnan).
