= Eudonia formosa =

Scientific classification
- Kingdom: Animalia
- Phylum: Arthropoda
- Class: Insecta
- Order: Lepidoptera
- Family: Crambidae
- Genus: Eudonia
- Species: E. formosa

Binomial name
- Eudonia formosa (Butler, 1881)

Synonyms
- Scoparia formosa Butler, 1881; Scoparia jucunda var. formosa Butler, 1881; Xeroscopa formosa; Scoparia formosa

Species of moth

Eudonia formosa is a moth of the family Crambidae. It is endemic to the Hawaiian islands of Oahu and Maui.
