= Pieter Cramer =

Dutch merchant and entomologist

Pieter Cramer (21 May 1721 (baptized) – 28 September 1776) was a wealthy Dutch merchant in linen and Spanish wool, remembered as an entomologist. A bachelor, he was born in Amsterdam, and lived on Oudezijds Voorburgwal at no. 131, close to the Oude Kerk. In 1760 he had bought the house, then known as "the Three Kings". Cramer was the director of the Zealand Society, a scientific society located in Flushing, and a member of Concordia et Libertate, based in Amsterdam. This literary and patriotic society, where Cramer gave lectures on minerals, commissioned and/or financed the publishing of his book De uitlandsche Kapellen, on foreign (exotic) butterflies, occurring in three parts of the world Asia, Africa and America.

Plate from De uitlandsche Kapellen

Cramer assembled an extensive natural history collection that included seashells, petrifications, fossils and insects of all orders. Many were colourful butterflies and moths (Lepidoptera), collected in countries where the Dutch had colonial or trading links, such as Surinam, Ceylon, Sierra Leone and the Dutch East Indies.

To produce a permanent record of his collection, Cramer engaged the painter Gerrit Wartenaar. He also arranged for Wartenaar to draw butterflies and moths belonging to other Dutch lepidopterists. One of them was stadtholder-prince William V of Orange. Hans Willem Baron Rengers and Joan Raye, the son of the former governor in Surinam, were among the others. Such was the quality of the illustrations that Caspar Stoll encouraged him to publish the set of drawings.

According to Cramer's will of 5 September 1774 the illustrations passed to his nephew Anthony van Rensselaer, under the condition that they be printed by the bookseller Johannes Baalde. As a result, De Uitlandsche Kapellen was published 1775–1782. It consisted of 33 parts, issued at intervals of three months to the subscribers, in four volumes. All of the drawings were accompanied by descriptions of the insects.

Cramer died "of high fevers" in 1776 after eight issues (Vol. I) had been published, leaving responsibility for finishing the project to Van Rensselaar and Stoll. Stoll is supposed to be the author of the text from page 29 of the fourth volume onwards.

De Uitlandsche Kapellen is a key work in the history of entomology. Beautifully illustrated with fine life-size hand-coloured engravings of Lepidoptera from Asia, Africa and America, it was the first book on exotic Lepidoptera to use the then new system developed by Carl Linnaeus (1707–1778) for naming and classifying animals. Over 1658 butterfly species were described and illustrated on 396 (or 400) plates, Cramer and Stoll naming and illustrating many new species for the first time.

Cramer's collections were broken up after his death and sold, auctioned and donated to institutions and individuals. The Dutch Nationaal Natuurhistorisch Museum came to own a substantial number of his specimens and bought part of Cramer's collection from Joan Raye, heer van Breukelerwaert.

== Works ==
De uitlandsche Kapellen voorkomende in de drie Waereld-Deelen Asia, Africa en America – Papillons exotiques des trois parties du monde l'Asie, l'Afrique et l'Amerique (1775–1782).
