= Caspar Stoll =

Naturalist and entomologist

Plate XL from De Uitlandsche Kapellen, vol. 1

Caspar Stoll (Hesse-Kassel, probably between 1725 and 1730 – Amsterdam, December 1791) was a naturalist and entomologist, best known for the completion of De Uitlandsche Kapellen, a work on butterflies begun by Pieter Cramer. He also published several works of his own on other insect groups. Stoll's 1787 publication on stick insects, mantises, and their relatives is also well known. It was translated into French in 1813.

== Life ==
Aside from official records, few biographical details are known. Caspar Stoll was born in Hesse-Kassel but lived most of his life in The Hague and Amsterdam. In the latter, he worked as a functionary (either a clerk or a porter) at the Admiralty of Amsterdam He married his first wife, Maria Sardijn, on 18 January 1761, they married in a church in Scheveningen. Her brother was a tax collector and a notary. Stoll appears to have worked for a notary as well: several times he put his signature as a witness.

They had four children baptised in The Hague. The godfather of the two boys was twice William V of Orange-Nassau and once baron Rengers. Before 1769 Stoll moved to Amsterdam. The couple lived on Haarlemmerdijk near Prinsengracht in a house he finally bought in 1778, and close to Jan Christiaan Sepp, who published some of his works. In Amsterdam, again four children were born. In 1772 two children died within a few months.

After the death of his first wife, in June 1786, he married Anna Elizabeth Kaal, originally from Hamburg. Her brothers lived in the area nearby. They married with a settlement on 21 October 1791, after having a baby, born a few months before. Stoll was working hard to finish his handwritten copies. On 22 December 1791, Stoll had made up his will. Before the end of the year he died. On 2 January 1792, Stoll was buried in the Noorderkerk in the morning. With Anna Elizabeth, he had another child, a son, born after his death. Precisely a year after his death, Anna Elizabeth, a member of the Lutheran church, married A.R. van Weylik, a burgomaster of Edam.

Stoll became involved with Pieter Cramer's De Uitlandsche Kapellen before 1774. He took over the entire work after the death of Cramer, on 26 September 1776. The first four volumes were finished in 1782 but Stoll kept working, at a much slower pace, caused by the lack of new material as he himself explained, on the supplement (Aanhangsel), which was finally finished in 1791. Stoll mentioned that all the butterflies were collected in the Dutch colonies, like Surinam, Ceylon, Java, Ambon and Sierra Leone. The work was completed "without losing sight of the all-powerful hand of the Creator". In the 18th century, this was a sort of automatism, to safeguard a book from being banned or burned.

While working on the supplement, he also worked on other insect groups, of which he was able to publish a volume on cicadas, one on heteroptera and finally a volume on mantises and related insects: Natuurlyke en naar 't leeven naauwkeurig gekleurde afbeeldingen en beschryvingen der spooken etc..

On the title page of this and other works, Stoll mentioned he was a member of the "Natuuronderzoekend Genoodschap te Halle".

== Works ==
- With Pieter Cramer De Uitlandsche Kapellen, ([1775-] 1779-1782 [-1791]), Amsterdam. It consists of 34 issues in four volumes with 400 drawings accompanied with descriptions of butterflies. Cramer, a member of the literary and patriotic society Concordia et Libertate, dedicated the work to the members of the society. He died before the publication of the first volume was completed. Stoll took over the entire responsibility for the project, also producing a supplement.

De Uitlandsche Kapellen is a key work in the history of entomology. Accurately illustrated with hand-coloured engravings this was the first book on exotic Lepidoptera to use the new system by Carl Linnaeus for naming and classifying animals. Over 1,658 butterfly species are described, many named and illustrated for the first time. Gerrit Wartenaar is identified as the painter. The original paintings are in the Natural History Museum, London.

- Proeve van eene rangschikkinge der donsvleugelige insecten, Lepidopterae / Caspar Stoll, 1782.
- De afbeeldingen der uitlandsche dag- en nagtkapellen, voorkomende in de vier deelen van het werk van wijlen den heere Peter Cramer: in orde gebragt en gevolgd naar mijne proeve van eene systematische rangschikkinge etc., Caspar Stoll / Amsterdam / 1787.
- Natuurlijke en naar 't leven naauwkeurig gekleurde afbeeldingen en beschryvingen der spooken, wandelende bladen, zabelspringhaanen, krekels, treksprinkhaanen en kakkerlakken in alle vier deelen der waereld, Europa, Asia, Afrika en America huishoudende by een verzamelt en beschreeven door Caspar Stoll / Amsterdam / 1787.
- Natuurlyke en naar 't leeven naauwkeurig gekleurde afbeeldingen en beschryvingen der wantzen, in alle vier waerelds deelen Europa, Asia, Africa en America huishoudende etc., Caspar Stoll / published by Jan Christiaan Sepp / 1788.
- Natuurlyke en naar 't leeven naauwkeurig gekleurde afbeeldingen en beschryvingen der cicaden, in alle vier waerelds deelen Europa, Asia, Africa en America huishoudende etc., Caspar Stoll / published by Jan Christiaan Sepp / 1788.
- Représentation exactement colorée d'après nature des Spectres ou Phasmes, des Mantes, des Sauterelles, des Grillons, des Criquets et des blattes qui se trouvent dans les quatre parties du monde / Amsterdam / 1813 (translation of Natuurlijke en naar 't leven naauwkeurig gekleurde afbeeldingen en beschryvingen der spooken, wandelende bladen, zabelspringhaanen, krekels, treksprinkhaanen en kakkerlakken in alle vier deelen der waereld, Europa, Asia, Afrika en America huishoudende by een verzamelt en beschreeven door Caspar Stoll, 1787).
