= Constant Bar =

French entomologist (1817–1884)

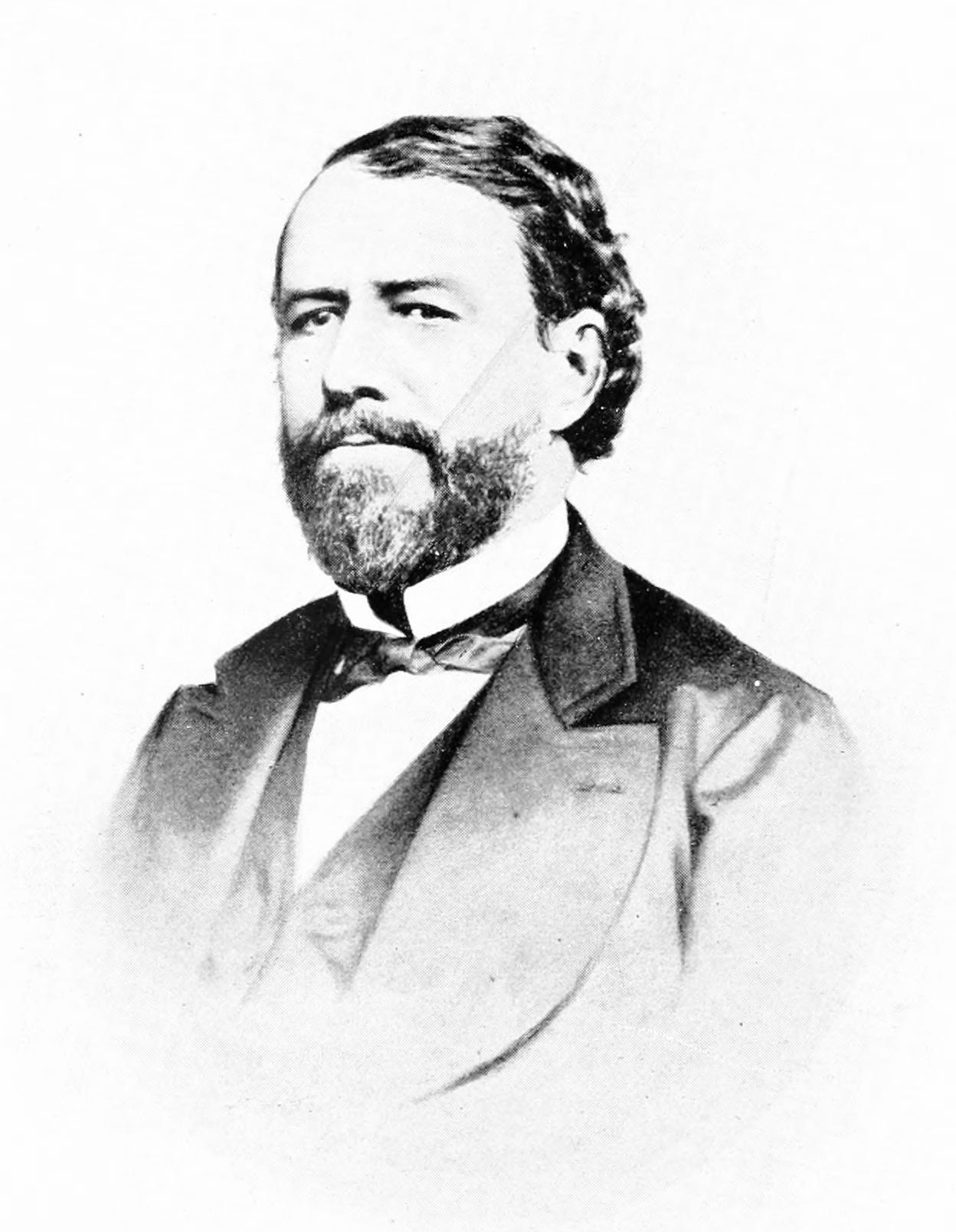
- Constant Bar
- Born: 14 October 1817; Nantes
- Died: June 1884 (aged 66); Paramaribo
- Occupation: French entomologist

Constant Bar (14 October 1817, in Nantes – June 1884, in Paramaribo) was a French entomologist.

Constant Bar lived in French Guiana at L'île Portal in the commune of Saint-Laurent-du-Maroni and with his three brothers made extensive entomological explorations of that region, collecting specimens for his own studies and for Charles Oberthür and others. He wrote "Note critique sur les différent systèmes de classification des lépidoptères rhopalocères établis depuis l'époque de Latreille et essai d'une nouvelle classification jusqu'aux genres exclusivement" for the Annales de la Societé entomologique de France in 1878. In 1854 he became a member of the Société entomologique de France.

He is honoured in the names Hypercompe bari, Heliconia bari and Parides lysander bari.
