= Phaedropsis placendalis =

Scientific classification
- Kingdom: Animalia
- Phylum: Arthropoda
- Class: Insecta
- Order: Lepidoptera
- Family: Crambidae
- Genus: Phaedropsis
- Species: P. placendalis

Binomial name
- Phaedropsis placendalis (Möschler, 1890)

Synonyms
- Botys placendalis Möschler, 1890

Species of moth

Phaedropsis placendalis is a species of moth in the family Crambidae. It was described by Heinrich Benno Möschler in 1890. It is found in Puerto Rico and Cuba.
