= Phaedropsis glutalis =

Scientific classification
- Kingdom: Animalia
- Phylum: Arthropoda
- Class: Insecta
- Order: Lepidoptera
- Family: Crambidae
- Genus: Phaedropsis
- Species: P. glutalis

Binomial name
- Phaedropsis glutalis (Möschler, 1881)

Synonyms
- Botis glutalis Möschler, 1881

Species of moth

Phaedropsis glutalis is a species of moth in the family Crambidae. It was described by Heinrich Benno Möschler in 1881. It is found in Suriname.
