= Phaedropsis meropialis =

Scientific classification
- Kingdom: Animalia
- Phylum: Arthropoda
- Class: Insecta
- Order: Lepidoptera
- Family: Crambidae
- Genus: Phaedropsis
- Species: P. meropialis

Binomial name
- Phaedropsis meropialis (Möschler, 1886)

Synonyms
- Botys meropialis Möschler, 1886; Sylepta orthogramma Hampson, 1912

Species of moth

Phaedropsis meropialis is a species of moth in the family Crambidae. It was described by Heinrich Benno Möschler in 1886. It is found in Jamaica and Cuba.
