= Stenoma surinamella =

Scientific classification
- Domain: Eukaryota
- Kingdom: Animalia
- Phylum: Arthropoda
- Class: Insecta
- Order: Lepidoptera
- Family: Depressariidae
- Genus: Stenoma
- Species: S. surinamella

Binomial name
- Stenoma surinamella (Möschler, 1883)

Synonyms
- Cryptolechia surinamella Möschler, 1883; Stenoma expilata Meyrick, 1915

Species of moth

Stenoma surinamella is a moth of the family Depressariidae. It is found in the Guianas and Brazil.

The wingspan is 26–31 mm for males and about 38 mm for females. The forewings are whitish ochreous with the extreme costal edge whitish. The stigmata are dark fuscous, the first discal indistinct, the plical obliquely beyond it. There is a faintly indicated irregularly curved fuscous shade from the middle of the costa to two-thirds of the dorsum and a curved series of cloudy fuscous lunulate dots from four-fifths of the costa to the dorsum before the tornus, sinuate inwards beneath the costa. A marginal series of small dark fuscous dots is found around the apex and termen. The hindwings are whitish yellowish, in females faintly greyish tinged on the basal half.
