= Phaedropsis collustralis =

Scientific classification
- Kingdom: Animalia
- Phylum: Arthropoda
- Class: Insecta
- Order: Lepidoptera
- Family: Crambidae
- Genus: Phaedropsis
- Species: P. collustralis

Binomial name
- Phaedropsis collustralis (Möschler, 1886)

Synonyms
- Botys collustralis Möschler, 1886

Species of moth

Phaedropsis collustralis is a species of moth in the family Crambidae. It was described by Heinrich Benno Möschler in 1886. It is found in Jamaica.
