= Cliniodes inferalis =

Scientific classification
- Domain: Eukaryota
- Kingdom: Animalia
- Phylum: Arthropoda
- Class: Insecta
- Order: Lepidoptera
- Family: Crambidae
- Genus: Cliniodes
- Species: C. inferalis

Binomial name
- Cliniodes inferalis Hayden, 2011

Species of moth

Cliniodes inferalis is a moth in the family Crambidae. It was described by James E. Hayden in 2011. It is found in Costa Rica and the eastern Andes from the Valle de Cauca in Colombia to Peru (Junín).

The length of the forewings is 15–17 mm for males and 17–18 mm for females. Adults have been recorded on wing in January, February and from May to November.

== Etymology ==
The species name refers to the maculation that is darker than Cliniodes superbalis, from which its distinct status is inferred. The name is derived from Latin infera (meaning the lower world).
