= Prenesta ornamentalis =

Scientific classification
- Kingdom: Animalia
- Phylum: Arthropoda
- Class: Insecta
- Order: Lepidoptera
- Family: Crambidae
- Genus: Prenesta
- Species: P. ornamentalis

Binomial name
- Prenesta ornamentalis (Möschler, 1881)

Synonyms
- Eurycreon ornamentalis Möschler, 1881

Species of moth

Prenesta ornamentalis is a moth in the family Crambidae. It is found in Suriname.
