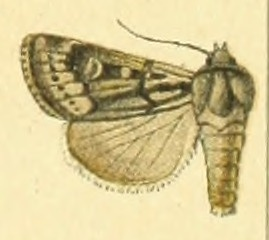

Scientific classification
- Domain: Eukaryota
- Kingdom: Animalia
- Phylum: Arthropoda
- Class: Insecta
- Order: Lepidoptera
- Superfamily: Noctuoidea
- Family: Noctuidae
- Genus: Euxoa
- Species: E. dissona

Binomial name
- Euxoa dissona (Möschler, 1860)

Synonyms
- Agrotis dissona Möschler, 1860; Agrotis opipara Morrison, 1875; Euxoa opipara (Morrison, 1875); Agrotis solitaria Smith, 1888

= Euxoa dissona =

Species of moth

Euxoa dissona, dissonant dart, is a moth of the family Noctuidae. It is found in north-eastern North America, including Quebec, Newfoundland and Labrador, the Northwest Territories, Manitoba and New Hampshire.
