= Progona pallida =

Scientific classification
- Domain: Eukaryota
- Kingdom: Animalia
- Phylum: Arthropoda
- Class: Insecta
- Order: Lepidoptera
- Superfamily: Noctuoidea
- Family: Erebidae
- Subfamily: Arctiinae
- Genus: Progona
- Species: P. pallida

Binomial name
- Progona pallida (Möschler, 1890)

Synonyms
- Delphyre pallida Möschler, 1890

Species of moth

Progona pallida is a moth in the subfamily Arctiinae. It was described by Heinrich Benno Möschler in 1890. It is found in Puerto Rico.
