= Eudoliche =

Scientific classification
- Domain: Eukaryota
- Kingdom: Animalia
- Phylum: Arthropoda
- Class: Insecta
- Order: Lepidoptera
- Superfamily: Noctuoidea
- Family: Erebidae
- Subfamily: Arctiinae
- Tribe: Lithosiini
- Genus: Eudoliche; Möschler, 1878

Genus of moths

Eudoliche is a genus of moths in the subfamily Arctiinae. The genus was erected by Heinrich Benno Möschler in 1878.

== Species ==
- Eudoliche longa Schaus, 1905
- Eudoliche major Rothschild, 1913
- Eudoliche osvalda Schaus, 1924
- Eudoliche vittata Möschler, 1878
