= Cliniodes euphrosinalis =

Scientific classification
- Domain: Eukaryota
- Kingdom: Animalia
- Phylum: Arthropoda
- Class: Insecta
- Order: Lepidoptera
- Family: Crambidae
- Genus: Cliniodes
- Species: C. euphrosinalis

Binomial name
- Cliniodes euphrosinalis Möschler, 1886

Synonyms
- Cliniodes cyllarusalis Druce, 1895; Cliniodes nomadalis Dyar, 1912; Cliniodes paucilinealis Snellen, 1895; Cliniodes euphrosinalis pallidior Munroe, 1956

Species of moth

Cliniodes euphrosinalis is a moth in the family Crambidae. It was described by Heinrich Benno Möschler in 1886. It is found on the Greater Antilles and Lesser Antilles and in Costa Rica, southern Mexico (north to San Luis Potosí), northern Venezuela and Colombia.

Adults have been recorded on wing year round except September.

The larvae feed on Daphnopsis americana.
