= Stenoma nubilella =

Scientific classification
- Domain: Eukaryota
- Kingdom: Animalia
- Phylum: Arthropoda
- Class: Insecta
- Order: Lepidoptera
- Family: Depressariidae
- Genus: Stenoma
- Species: S. nubilella

Binomial name
- Stenoma nubilella (Möschler, 1882)

Synonyms
- Diastoma nubilella Möschler, 1882

Species of moth

Stenoma nubilella is a moth in the family Depressariidae. It was described by Heinrich Benno Möschler in 1882. It is found in Guyana.
