= Pseudometachilo irrectellus =

Scientific classification
- Domain: Eukaryota
- Kingdom: Animalia
- Phylum: Arthropoda
- Class: Insecta
- Order: Lepidoptera
- Family: Crambidae
- Subfamily: Crambinae
- Tribe: incertae sedis
- Genus: Pseudometachilo
- Species: P. irrectellus

Binomial name
- Pseudometachilo irrectellus (Möschler, 1882)

Synonyms
- Chilo irrectellus Möschler, 1882; Crambus distictellus Hampson, 1896; Crambus diatraeellus Hampson, 1896

Species of moth

Pseudometachilo irrectellus is a moth in the family Crambidae. It was described by Heinrich Benno Möschler in 1882. It is found in French Guiana, Suriname and Paraná, Brazil.
