= Dichomeris manellus =

Scientific classification
- Domain: Eukaryota
- Kingdom: Animalia
- Phylum: Arthropoda
- Class: Insecta
- Order: Lepidoptera
- Family: Gelechiidae
- Genus: Dichomeris
- Species: D. manellus

Binomial name
- Dichomeris manellus (Möschler, 1890)

Synonyms
- Ypsolophus manellus Möschler, 1890

Species of moth

Dichomeris manellus is a moth in the family Gelechiidae. It was described by Heinrich Benno Möschler in 1890. It is found in Puerto Rico.
