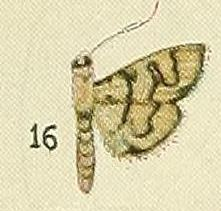
- Goniorhynchus pasithea

Scientific classification
- Domain: Eukaryota
- Kingdom: Animalia
- Phylum: Arthropoda
- Class: Insecta
- Order: Lepidoptera
- Family: Crambidae
- Subfamily: Spilomelinae
- Genus: Goniorhynchus; Hampson, 1896

= Goniorhynchus =

Genus of moths

Goniorhynchus is a genus of moths of the family Crambidae.

== Species ==
- Goniorhynchus butyrosa (Butler, 1879)
- Goniorhynchus calamitalis Snellen, 1898
- Goniorhynchus chalybealis Snellen, 1892
- Goniorhynchus clausalis (Christoph, 1881)
- Goniorhynchus exemplaris Hampson, 1898
- Goniorhynchus flaviguttalis Warren, 1896
- Goniorhynchus gratalis (Lederer, 1863)
- Goniorhynchus gulielmalis Holland, 1900
- Goniorhynchus hampsoni (Klima, 1939 - replacement name)
- Goniorhynchus marasmialis Hampson, 1898
- Goniorhynchus marginalis Warren, 1896
- Goniorhynchus obscurus Hampson, 1898
- Goniorhynchus octosema Hampson, 1912
- Goniorhynchus pasithea (Fawcett, 1916)
- Goniorhynchus pectinalis Hampson, 1898
- Goniorhynchus plumbeizonalis Hampson, 1896
- Goniorhynchus salaconalis (Druce, 1895)

== Former species ==
- Goniorhynchus argyropalis (Hampson, 1908)
- Goniorhynchus lasyguialis Hampson, 1912
