= Cliniodes paradisalis =

Scientific classification
- Domain: Eukaryota
- Kingdom: Animalia
- Phylum: Arthropoda
- Class: Insecta
- Order: Lepidoptera
- Family: Crambidae
- Genus: Cliniodes
- Species: C. paradisalis

Binomial name
- Cliniodes paradisalis (Möschler, 1886)

Synonyms
- Basonga paradisalis Möschler, 1886

Species of moth

Cliniodes paradisalis is a moth in the family Crambidae. It was described by Heinrich Benno Möschler in 1886. It is found in Jamaica, Cuba and on the Cayman Islands.
