= Trichaea flammeolalis =

Scientific classification
- Domain: Eukaryota
- Kingdom: Animalia
- Phylum: Arthropoda
- Class: Insecta
- Order: Lepidoptera
- Family: Crambidae
- Genus: Trichaea
- Species: T. flammeolalis

Binomial name
- Trichaea flammeolalis (Möschler, 1890)

Synonyms
- Botys flammeolalis Möschler, 1890

Species of moth

Trichaea flammeolalis is a moth in the family Crambidae. It is found in Puerto Rico.
