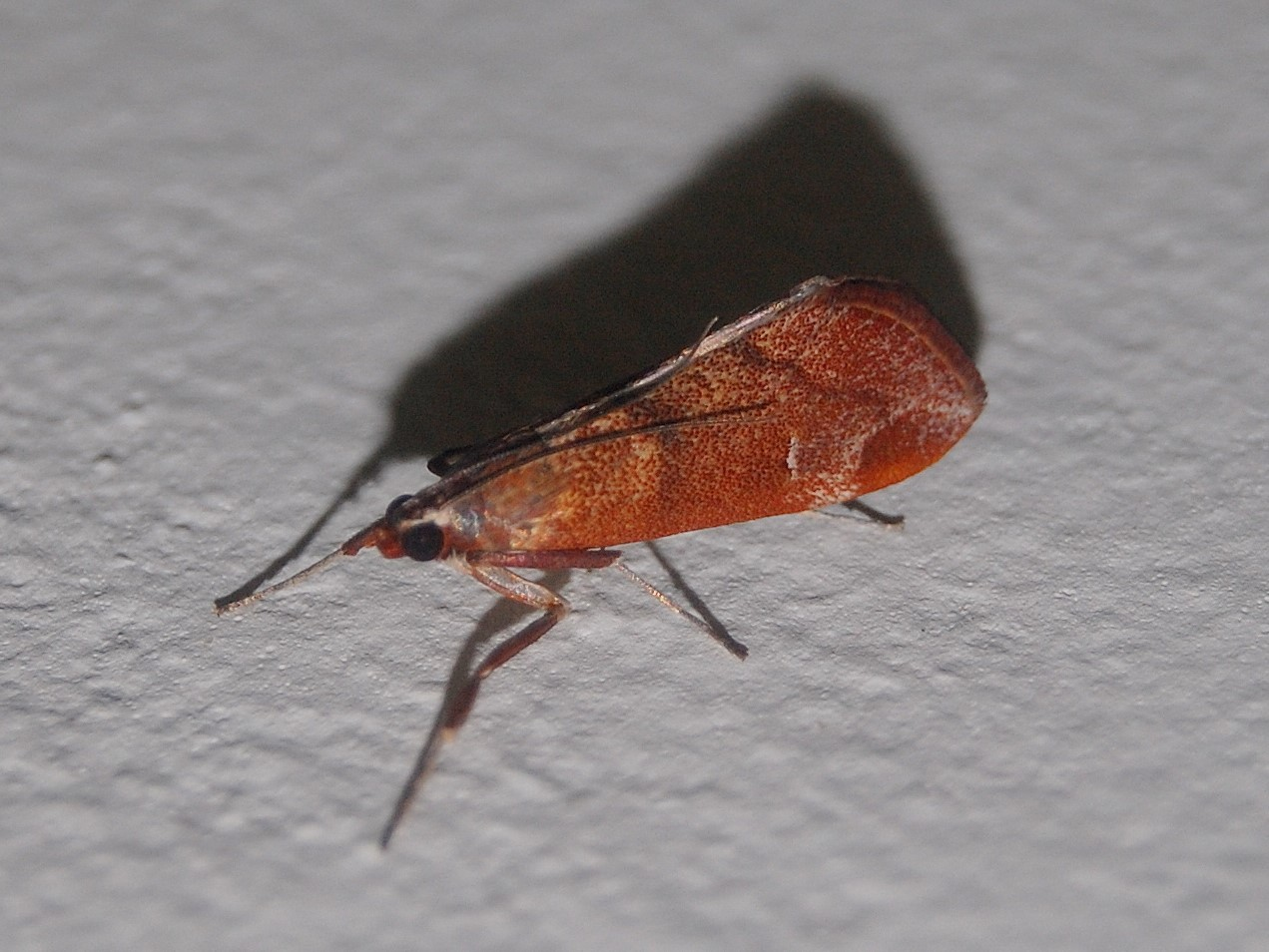

Scientific classification
- Kingdom: Animalia
- Phylum: Arthropoda
- Clade: Pancrustacea
- Class: Insecta
- Order: Lepidoptera
- Family: Crambidae
- Genus: Cliniodes
- Species: C. semilunalis

Binomial name
- Cliniodes semilunalis Möschler, 1890

= Cliniodes semilunalis =

Species of moth

Cliniodes semilunalis is a species of moth in the family Crambidae. It was first described by Heinrich Benno Möschler in 1890. It is found in southern Brazil, north to northern Goiás.

The length of the forewings is 12–16 mm for males and 17–20 mm for females. Adults have been recorded on wing in May, September and November.
