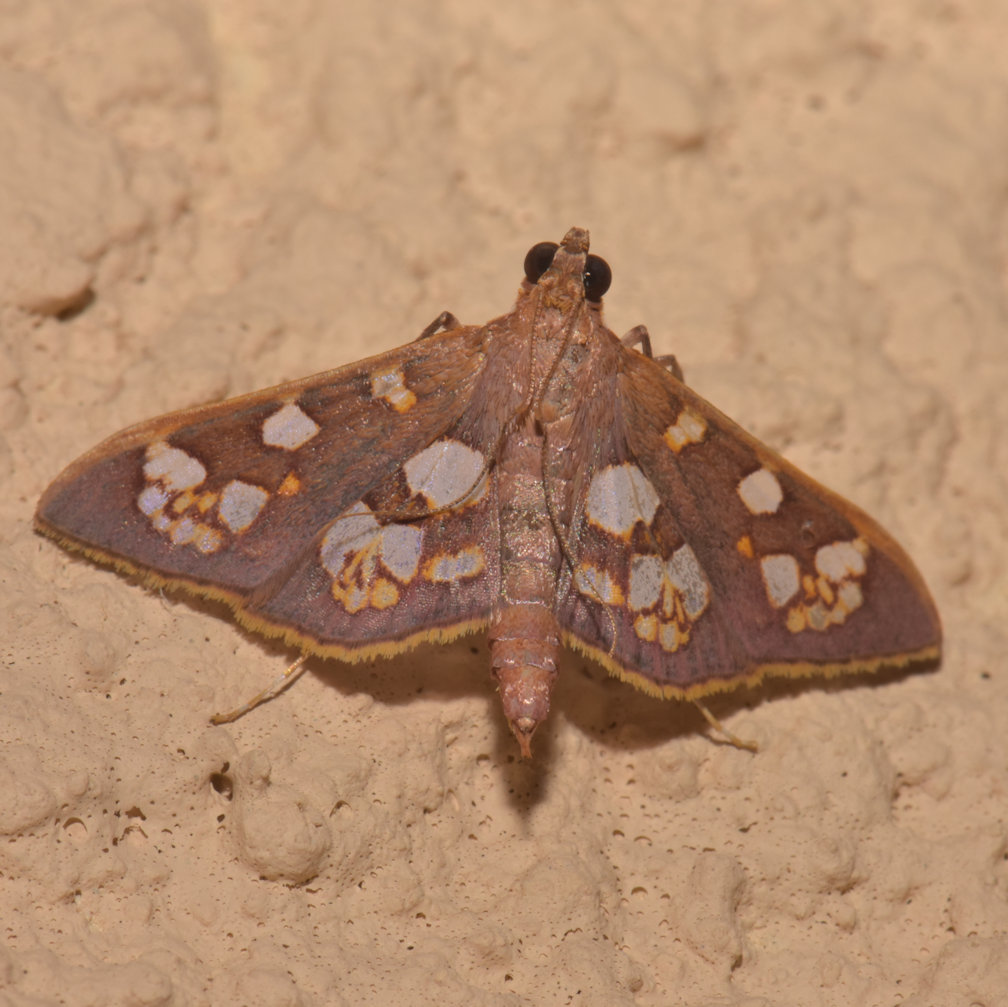

Scientific classification
- Kingdom: Animalia
- Phylum: Arthropoda
- Class: Insecta
- Order: Lepidoptera
- Family: Crambidae
- Genus: Prenesta
- Species: P. ignefactalis

Binomial name
- Prenesta ignefactalis (Möschler, 1886)

Synonyms
- Trithyris ignefactalis Möschler, 1886

= Prenesta ignefactalis =

Species of moth

Prenesta ignefactalis is a species of moth in the family Crambidae. It is found in Jamaica.
