= Eudoliche vittata =

Scientific classification
- Domain: Eukaryota
- Kingdom: Animalia
- Phylum: Arthropoda
- Class: Insecta
- Order: Lepidoptera
- Superfamily: Noctuoidea
- Family: Erebidae
- Subfamily: Arctiinae
- Genus: Eudoliche
- Species: E. vittata

Binomial name
- Eudoliche vittata Möschler, 1878

Synonyms
- Eudoliche achatina Butler, 1878; Eudoliche rufitincta Rothschild, 1913

Species of moth

Eudoliche vittata is a moth of the subfamily Arctiinae first described by Heinrich Benno Möschler in 1878. It is found in Suriname and the Amazon region.
