= Pryteria costata =

Scientific classification
- Domain: Eukaryota
- Kingdom: Animalia
- Phylum: Arthropoda
- Class: Insecta
- Order: Lepidoptera
- Superfamily: Noctuoidea
- Family: Erebidae
- Subfamily: Arctiinae
- Genus: Pryteria
- Species: P. costata

Binomial name
- Pryteria costata Möschler, 1882

Synonyms
- Pryteria costata f. nigroapicalis Gaede, 1923

Species of moth

Pryteria costata is a moth in the family Erebidae. It was described by Heinrich Benno Möschler in 1882. It is found in Suriname and French Guiana.
