= Herea prittwitzi =

Scientific classification
- Kingdom: Animalia
- Phylum: Arthropoda
- Clade: Pancrustacea
- Class: Insecta
- Order: Lepidoptera
- Superfamily: Noctuoidea
- Family: Erebidae
- Subfamily: Arctiinae
- Genus: Herea
- Species: H. prittwitzi

Binomial name
- Herea prittwitzi (Möschler, 1872)

Synonyms
- Desmidocnemis prittwitzi Möschler, 1872; Herea xanthogaster Druce, 1898

Species of moth

Herea prittwitzi is a moth of the subfamily Arctiinae. It was described by Heinrich Benno Möschler in 1872. It is found in French Guiana and Bolivia.
