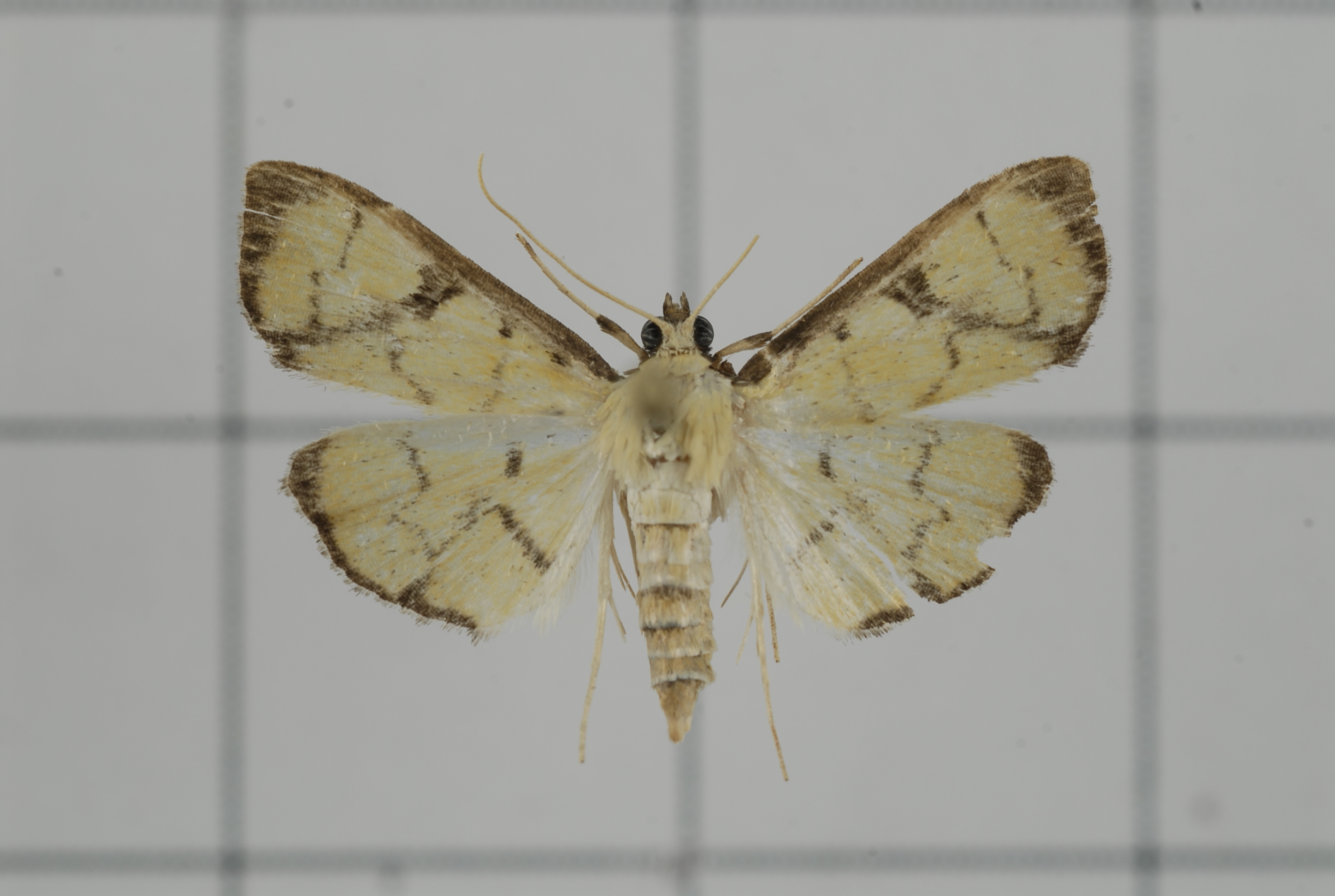

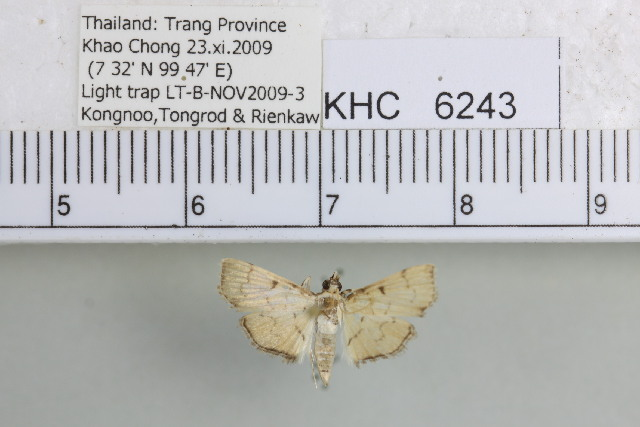

Scientific classification
- Domain: Eukaryota
- Kingdom: Animalia
- Phylum: Arthropoda
- Class: Insecta
- Order: Lepidoptera
- Family: Crambidae
- Genus: Goniorhynchus
- Species: G. butyrosa

Binomial name
- Goniorhynchus butyrosa (Butler, 1879)

Synonyms
- Samea butyrosa Butler, 1879

= Goniorhynchus butyrosa =

Species of moth

Goniorhynchus butyrosa is a moth in the family Crambidae. It was described by Arthur Gardiner Butler in 1879. It is found in China, Thailand and Japan.
