= Phaedropsis hecalialis =

Scientific classification
- Kingdom: Animalia
- Phylum: Arthropoda
- Class: Insecta
- Order: Lepidoptera
- Family: Crambidae
- Genus: Phaedropsis
- Species: P. hecalialis

Binomial name
- Phaedropsis hecalialis (Walker, 1859)

Synonyms
- Botys hecalialis Walker, 1859

Species of moth

Phaedropsis hecalialis is a species of moth in the family Crambidae. It was described by Francis Walker in 1859. It is found in the Dominican Republic.
