= Cliniodes opalalis =

Scientific classification
- Kingdom: Animalia
- Phylum: Arthropoda
- Class: Insecta
- Order: Lepidoptera
- Family: Crambidae
- Genus: Cliniodes
- Species: C. opalalis

Binomial name
- Cliniodes opalalis Guenée, 1854

Synonyms
- Idessa pyrgionalis Walker, 1859

Species of moth

Cliniodes opalalis is a moth in the family Crambidae. It was described by Achille Guenée in 1854. It is found in Central America, north to southern Mexico. It is also found in Cuba, Jamaica and in the Andes from Colombia to Bolivia. It has also been recorded from northern Venezuela, Trinidad and Tobago and north-eastern Brazil.

The length of the forewings is 11–19 mm for males and 13–20 mm for females. Adults have been recorded on wing year round.
