= Eudoliche major =

Scientific classification
- Domain: Eukaryota
- Kingdom: Animalia
- Phylum: Arthropoda
- Class: Insecta
- Order: Lepidoptera
- Superfamily: Noctuoidea
- Family: Erebidae
- Subfamily: Arctiinae
- Genus: Eudoliche
- Species: E. major

Binomial name
- Eudoliche major Rothschild, 1913

Species of moth

Eudoliche major is a moth of the subfamily Arctiinae. It is found in Peru.
