= Cliniodes saburralis =

Scientific classification
- Kingdom: Animalia
- Phylum: Arthropoda
- Class: Insecta
- Order: Lepidoptera
- Family: Crambidae
- Genus: Cliniodes
- Species: C. saburralis

Binomial name
- Cliniodes saburralis Guenée, 1854

Species of moth

Cliniodes saburralis is a moth in the family Crambidae. It was described by Achille Guenée in 1854. It is found in the Andes from Colombia to central Bolivia.
