= Pseudometachilo subfaunellus =

Scientific classification
- Domain: Eukaryota
- Kingdom: Animalia
- Phylum: Arthropoda
- Class: Insecta
- Order: Lepidoptera
- Family: Crambidae
- Genus: Pseudometachilo
- Species: P. subfaunellus

Binomial name
- Pseudometachilo subfaunellus Błeszyński, 1967

Species of moth

Pseudometachilo subfaunellus is a moth in the family Crambidae. It was described by Stanisław Błeszyński in 1967. It is found in Uruguay.
