= Eudoliche osvalda =

Scientific classification
- Kingdom: Animalia
- Phylum: Arthropoda
- Class: Insecta
- Order: Lepidoptera
- Superfamily: Noctuoidea
- Family: Erebidae
- Subfamily: Arctiinae
- Genus: Eudoliche
- Species: E. osvalda

Binomial name
- Eudoliche osvalda Schaus, 1924

Species of moth

Eudoliche osvalda is a moth of the subfamily Arctiinae. It is found on Cuba.
