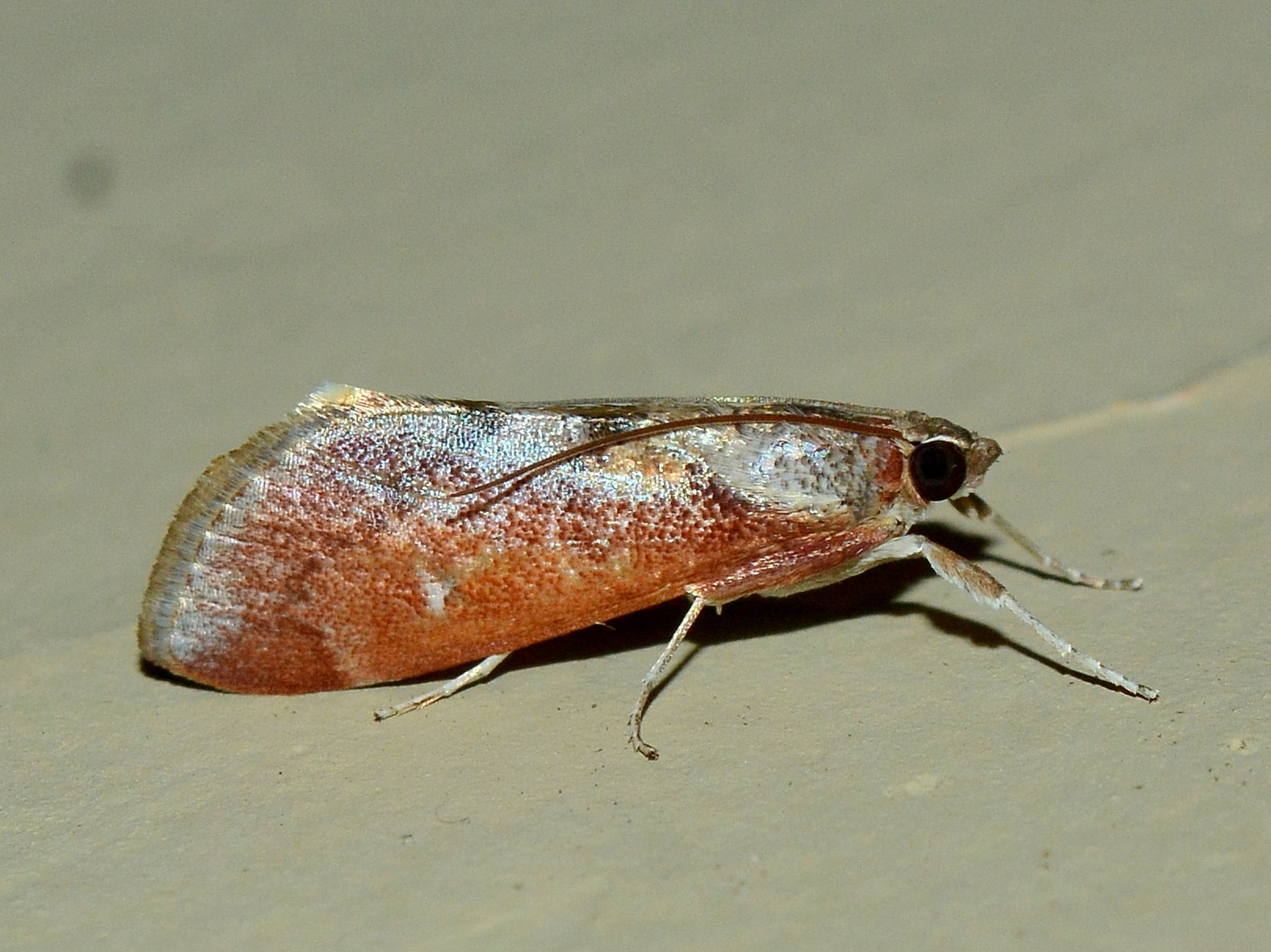

Scientific classification
- Kingdom: Animalia
- Phylum: Arthropoda
- Clade: Pancrustacea
- Class: Insecta
- Order: Lepidoptera
- Family: Crambidae
- Genus: Cliniodes
- Species: C. subflavescens

Binomial name
- Cliniodes subflavescens Hayden, 2011

= Cliniodes subflavescens =

Species of moth

Cliniodes subflavescens is a species of moth that belongs to the family Crambidae. It is found in southern Brazil, north to the Federal District. The species was first described by James E. Hayden in 2011.

== Description ==
Adults have been recorded on wing in January, February, April, May and from September to December.

== Etymology ==
The species name is derived from Latin subflavescere, meaning to become slightly yellow.
