= Goniorhynchus chalybaealis =

Scientific classification
- Kingdom: Animalia
- Phylum: Arthropoda
- Class: Insecta
- Order: Lepidoptera
- Family: Crambidae
- Genus: Goniorhynchus
- Species: G. chalybaealis

Binomial name
- Goniorhynchus chalybaealis (Snellen, 1892)

Synonyms
- Botys chalybaealis Snellen, 1892

Species of moth

Goniorhynchus chalybaealis is a moth in the family Crambidae. It was described by Snellen in 1892. It is found on Java.
