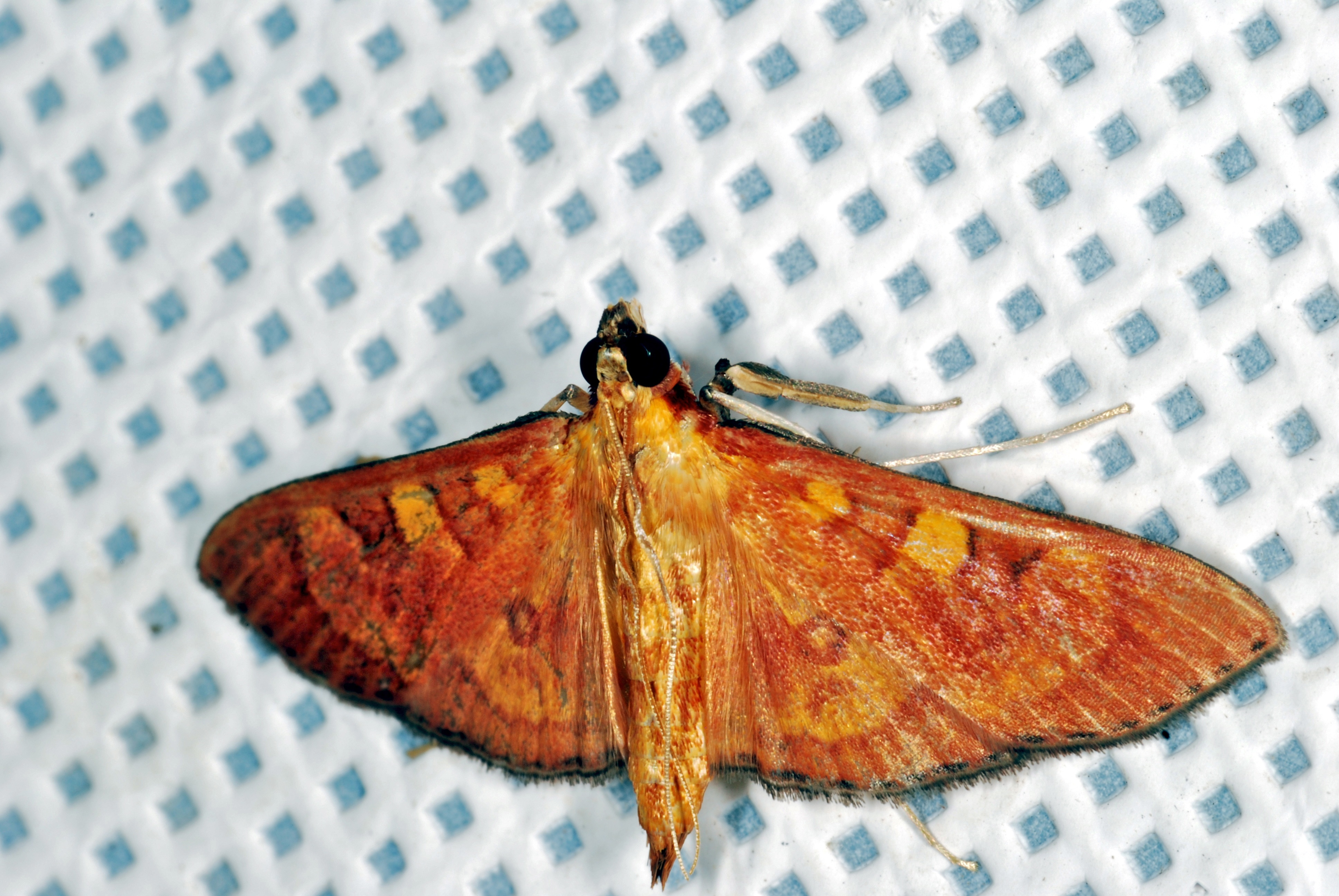
- San Ignacio, Belize

Scientific classification
- Kingdom: Animalia
- Phylum: Arthropoda
- Class: Insecta
- Order: Lepidoptera
- Family: Crambidae
- Genus: Prenesta
- Species: P. scyllalis

Binomial name
- Prenesta scyllalis (Walker, 1859)

Synonyms
- Botys scyllalis Walker, 1859; Trithyris scyllalis; Botys turnusalis Walker, 1859; Botys delicatalis Lederer, 1863; Prenesta fabialis Snellen, 1875

= Prenesta scyllalis =

Species of moth

Prenesta scyllalis is a moth in the family Crambidae. It was described by Francis Walker in 1859. It is found in Brazil, Colombia, Peru, Costa Rica, Honduras, Belize and Mexico.

The wingspan is about 25 mm. Adults are luteous (yellowish), the wings with red interior and exterior lines and with blackish marginal points. The forewings are reddish along the costa and there is a large reddish reniform mark.
