= Phaedropsis chromalis =

Scientific classification
- Kingdom: Animalia
- Phylum: Arthropoda
- Class: Insecta
- Order: Lepidoptera
- Family: Crambidae
- Genus: Phaedropsis
- Species: P. chromalis

Binomial name
- Phaedropsis chromalis (Guenée, 1854)

Synonyms
- Asopia chromalis Guenée, 1854; Syllepta chronalis Amsel, 1956

Species of moth

Phaedropsis chromalis is a species of moth in the family Crambidae. It was described by Achille Guenée in 1854. It is found in French Guiana and Brazil.
