= Phaedropsis bipunctalis =

Scientific classification
- Kingdom: Animalia
- Phylum: Arthropoda
- Class: Insecta
- Order: Lepidoptera
- Family: Crambidae
- Genus: Phaedropsis
- Species: P. bipunctalis

Binomial name
- Phaedropsis bipunctalis (Hampson, 1895)

Synonyms
- Haritala bipunctalis Hampson, 1895

Species of moth

Phaedropsis bipunctalis is a moth in the family Crambidae. It was described by George Hampson in 1895. It is found in Grenada in the southeastern Caribbean Sea.
