= Cliniodes muralis =

Scientific classification
- Domain: Eukaryota
- Kingdom: Animalia
- Phylum: Arthropoda
- Class: Insecta
- Order: Lepidoptera
- Family: Crambidae
- Genus: Cliniodes
- Species: C. muralis

Binomial name
- Cliniodes muralis Hayden, 2011

Species of moth

Cliniodes muralis is a moth in the family Crambidae. It was described by James E. Hayden in 2011. It is found in the Dominican Republic and Cuba.

The length of the forewings is 10–12 mm for males and 13–14 mm for females. Adults have been recorded on wing in March, May and November in the Dominican Republic and in July in Cuba.

== Etymology ==
The species name refers to the small size and nearly monochromatic grey or brownish red maculation and is derived from Latin mus (meaning mouse).
