= Eudoliche longa =

Scientific classification
- Domain: Eukaryota
- Kingdom: Animalia
- Phylum: Arthropoda
- Class: Insecta
- Order: Lepidoptera
- Superfamily: Noctuoidea
- Family: Erebidae
- Subfamily: Arctiinae
- Genus: Eudoliche
- Species: E. longa

Binomial name
- Eudoliche longa Schaus, 1905

Species of moth

Eudoliche longa is a moth of the subfamily Arctiinae. It is found in French Guiana.
