= Phaedropsis principialis =

Scientific classification
- Kingdom: Animalia
- Phylum: Arthropoda
- Class: Insecta
- Order: Lepidoptera
- Family: Crambidae
- Genus: Phaedropsis
- Species: P. principialis

Binomial name
- Phaedropsis principialis (Lederer, 1863)

Synonyms
- Botys principialis Lederer, 1863; Botys principalis Lederer, 1863

Species of moth

Phaedropsis principialis is a species of moth in the family Crambidae. It was described by Julius Lederer in 1863. It is found in Jamaica.
