= Goniorhynchus salaconalis =

Scientific classification
- Domain: Eukaryota
- Kingdom: Animalia
- Phylum: Arthropoda
- Class: Insecta
- Order: Lepidoptera
- Family: Crambidae
- Genus: Goniorhynchus
- Species: G. salaconalis

Binomial name
- Goniorhynchus salaconalis (H. Druce, 1895)

Synonyms
- Mimorista salaconalis H. Druce, 1895

Species of moth

Goniorhynchus salaconalis is a moth in the family Crambidae. It was described by Herbert Druce in 1895. It is found in Panama and Costa Rica.
