= Cliniodes opertalis =

Scientific classification
- Domain: Eukaryota
- Kingdom: Animalia
- Phylum: Arthropoda
- Class: Insecta
- Order: Lepidoptera
- Family: Crambidae
- Genus: Cliniodes
- Species: C. opertalis

Binomial name
- Cliniodes opertalis Hayden, 2011

Species of moth

Cliniodes opertalis is a moth in the family Crambidae. It was described by James E. Hayden in 2011. It is found at low elevations in Peru, southern Venezuela and Brazil (Rondônia).

The length of the forewings is 12–15 mm.
