= Cliniodes seriopunctalis =

Scientific classification
- Kingdom: Animalia
- Phylum: Arthropoda
- Class: Insecta
- Order: Lepidoptera
- Family: Crambidae
- Genus: Cliniodes
- Species: C. seriopunctalis

Binomial name
- Cliniodes seriopunctalis Hampson, 1913

Species of moth

Cliniodes seriopunctalis is a moth in the family Crambidae. It was described by George Hampson in 1913. It is found in Costa Rica.

The length of the forewings is 13–15 mm for males and 14–15 mm for females. Adults have been recorded on wing in September.
