= Cliniodes costimacula =

Scientific classification
- Kingdom: Animalia
- Phylum: Arthropoda
- Class: Insecta
- Order: Lepidoptera
- Family: Crambidae
- Genus: Cliniodes
- Species: C. costimacula

Binomial name
- Cliniodes costimacula (Hampson, 1913)

Synonyms
- Pyrausta costimacula Hampson, 1913

Species of moth

Cliniodes costimacula is a moth in the family Crambidae. It was described by George Hampson in 1913. It is found in the Andes of Bolivia and Peru and also in Venezuela.

Adults have been recorded on wing in January, from March to May and from September to December.
