= Trichaea pudens =

Scientific classification
- Domain: Eukaryota
- Kingdom: Animalia
- Phylum: Arthropoda
- Class: Insecta
- Order: Lepidoptera
- Family: Crambidae
- Genus: Trichaea
- Species: T. pudens

Binomial name
- Trichaea pudens (H. Druce, 1902)

Synonyms
- Acridura pudens H. Druce, 1902; Synchromia xanthosoma Dognin, 1905

Species of moth

Trichaea pudens is a moth in the family Crambidae. It was described by Herbert Druce in 1902. It is found in Ecuador.

The forewings are pale purplish brown, the base and half the costal margin deep chrome yellow. The hindwings are pale yellow, the inner margin chrome yellow and the apex and outer margin pale purplish brown.
