= Trichaea pulchralis =

Scientific classification
- Domain: Eukaryota
- Kingdom: Animalia
- Phylum: Arthropoda
- Class: Insecta
- Order: Lepidoptera
- Family: Crambidae
- Genus: Trichaea
- Species: T. pulchralis

Binomial name
- Trichaea pulchralis (Schaus, 1912)

Synonyms
- Acridura pulchralis Schaus, 1912

Species of moth

Trichaea pulchralis is a moth in the family Crambidae. It was described by Schaus in 1912. It is found in Costa Rica.
