= Goniorhynchus flaviguttalis =

Scientific classification
- Domain: Eukaryota
- Kingdom: Animalia
- Phylum: Arthropoda
- Class: Insecta
- Order: Lepidoptera
- Family: Crambidae
- Genus: Goniorhynchus
- Species: G. flaviguttalis

Binomial name
- Goniorhynchus flaviguttalis Warren, 1896

Species of moth

Goniorhynchus flaviguttalis is a moth in the family Crambidae. It was described by Warren in 1896. It is found in India.
