= Phaedropsis illustralis =

Scientific classification
- Kingdom: Animalia
- Phylum: Arthropoda
- Class: Insecta
- Order: Lepidoptera
- Family: Crambidae
- Genus: Phaedropsis
- Species: P. illustralis

Binomial name
- Phaedropsis illustralis (Dognin, 1913)

Synonyms
- Sylepta illustralis Dognin, 1913

Species of moth

Phaedropsis illustralis is a species of moth in the family Crambidae. It was described by Paul Dognin in 1913. It is found in Peru.
