= Cliniodes rubialalis =

Scientific classification
- Domain: Eukaryota
- Kingdom: Animalia
- Phylum: Arthropoda
- Class: Insecta
- Order: Lepidoptera
- Family: Crambidae
- Genus: Cliniodes
- Species: C. rubialalis

Binomial name
- Cliniodes rubialalis Dognin, 1897

Synonyms
- Pyrausta egcarsialis Hampson, 1899; Pyrausta rubidalis Hampson, 1899

Species of moth

Cliniodes rubialalis is a moth in the family Crambidae. It was described by Paul Dognin in 1897. It is found in the eastern Andes from Bolivia to Ecuador, as well as in Costa Rica.

The length of the forewings is 11–15 mm for males and 12–14 mm for females. Adults have been recorded on wing in January, from March to May and in August, September, November and December.
