= Goniorhynchus octosema =

Scientific classification
- Kingdom: Animalia
- Phylum: Arthropoda
- Clade: Pancrustacea
- Class: Insecta
- Order: Lepidoptera
- Family: Crambidae
- Genus: Goniorhynchus
- Species: G. octosema

Binomial name
- Goniorhynchus octosema Hampson, 1912

Species of moth

Goniorhynchus octosema is a moth in the family Crambidae. It was described by George Hampson in 1912. It is found in Singapore and Malaysia.
