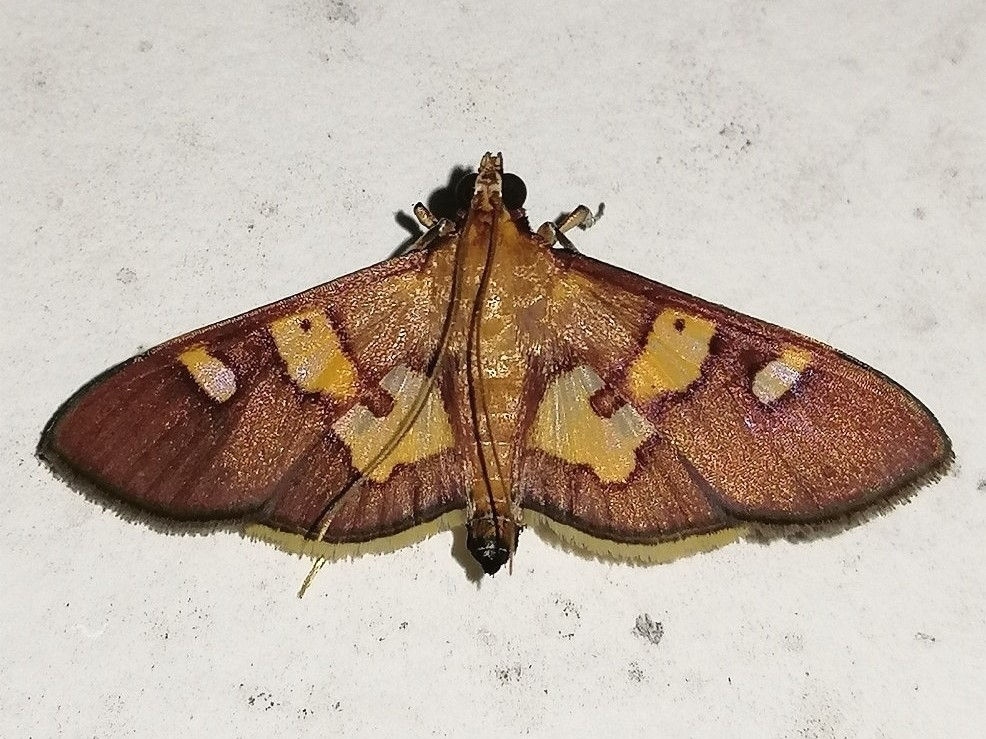

Scientific classification
- Kingdom: Animalia
- Phylum: Arthropoda
- Class: Insecta
- Order: Lepidoptera
- Family: Crambidae
- Genus: Prenesta
- Species: P. evippealis

Binomial name
- Prenesta evippealis (Walker, 1859)

Synonyms
- Botys evippealis Walker, 1859; Trithyris auropurpuralis Dognin, 1910

= Prenesta evippealis =

Species of moth

Prenesta evippealis is a species of moth in the family Crambidae. It was first described by Francis Walker in 1859 and is found in Brazil (Pará), Peru and French Guiana.
