= Cliniodes glaucescens =

Scientific classification
- Kingdom: Animalia
- Phylum: Arthropoda
- Class: Insecta
- Order: Lepidoptera
- Family: Crambidae
- Genus: Cliniodes
- Species: C. glaucescens

Binomial name
- Cliniodes glaucescens (Hampson, 1899)

Synonyms
- Pyrausta glaucescens Hampson, 1899

Species of moth

Cliniodes glaucescens is a moth in the family Crambidae. It was described by George Hampson in 1899. It is found in the eastern Andes, from Bolivia to Ecuador, as well as in Guatemala and Costa Rica.
