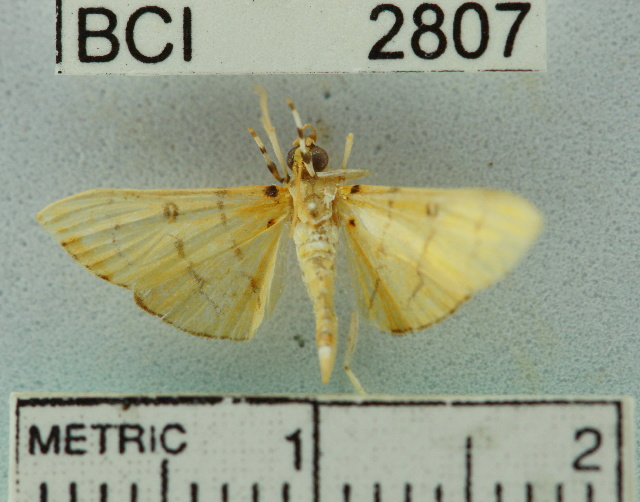

Scientific classification
- Kingdom: Animalia
- Phylum: Arthropoda
- Class: Insecta
- Order: Lepidoptera
- Family: Crambidae
- Genus: Phaedropsis
- Species: P. alitemeralis

Binomial name
- Phaedropsis alitemeralis (Dyar, 1914)

Synonyms
- Lygropia alitemeralis Dyar, 1914

= Phaedropsis alitemeralis =

Species of moth

Phaedropsis alitemeralis is a species of moth in the family Crambidae. It was described by Harrison Gray Dyar Jr. in 1914. It is found in Panama and Costa Rica.
