= Progona =

Scientific classification
- Domain: Eukaryota
- Kingdom: Animalia
- Phylum: Arthropoda
- Class: Insecta
- Order: Lepidoptera
- Superfamily: Noctuoidea
- Family: Erebidae
- Subfamily: Arctiinae
- Tribe: Lithosiini
- Genus: Progona; Berg, 1882

Synonyms
- Parablavia Schaus, 1899; Parablavia Hampson, 1900

Genus of moths

Progona is a genus of moths in the subfamily Arctiinae.

== Species ==
- Progona pallida Möschler, 1890
- Progona sadima Schaus, 1896
- Progona venata Schaus, 1921
- Progona xanthura Schaus, 1899
- Progona luridipennis Burmeister, 1878
