= Progona sadima =

Scientific classification
- Domain: Eukaryota
- Kingdom: Animalia
- Phylum: Arthropoda
- Class: Insecta
- Order: Lepidoptera
- Superfamily: Noctuoidea
- Family: Erebidae
- Subfamily: Arctiinae
- Genus: Progona
- Species: P. sadima

Binomial name
- Progona sadima (Schaus, 1896)

Synonyms
- Lithosia sadima Schaus, 1896

Species of moth

Progona sadima is a moth in the subfamily Arctiinae. It was described by Schaus in 1896. It is found in Brazil.
