= Herea =

Scientific classification
- Kingdom: Animalia
- Phylum: Arthropoda
- Class: Insecta
- Order: Lepidoptera
- Superfamily: Noctuoidea
- Family: Erebidae
- Subfamily: Arctiinae
- Genus: Herea; Walker, 1854

Synonyms
- Desmidocnemis Möschler, 1872

Genus of moths

Herea is a genus of moths in the subfamily Arctiinae. The genus was erected by Francis Walker in 1854.

== Species ==
- Herea abdominalis Gaede, 1926
- Herea metaxanthus Walker, 1854
- Herea prittwitzi Möschler, 1872
- Herea ruficeps Walker, 1854
