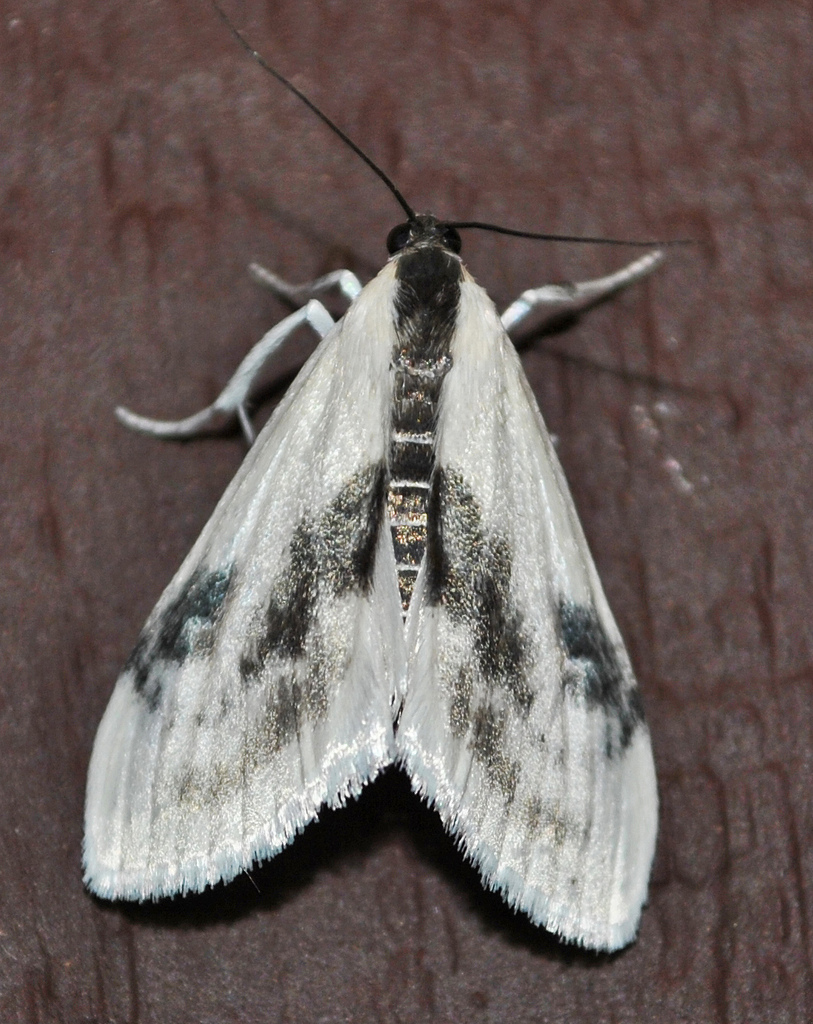

Scientific classification
- Domain: Eukaryota
- Kingdom: Animalia
- Phylum: Arthropoda
- Class: Insecta
- Order: Lepidoptera
- Family: Crambidae
- Genus: Cliniodes
- Species: C. ostreonalis

Binomial name
- Cliniodes ostreonalis (Grote, 1882)

Synonyms
- Metrea ostreonalis Grote, 1882; Botys urticaloides Fyles, 1894

= Cliniodes ostreonalis =

Species of moth

Cliniodes ostreonalis, the oystershell metrea moth, is a moth in the family Crambidae. It was described by Augustus Radcliffe Grote in 1882. It is found in North America, where it has been recorded from Connecticut, Indiana, Kentucky, Maine, Maryland, Michigan, New Brunswick, New York, Ohio, Ontario, Pennsylvania, Quebec, Vermont, West Virginia and Wisconsin.

The length of the forewings is 13–16 mm for males and 15–17 mm for females. The forewings are very light yellow with a nebulous, blackish mesial band. The hindwings are white with a purplish iridescence. Adults have been recorded on wing from May to August.
