= Prenesta philinoralis =

Scientific classification
- Kingdom: Animalia
- Phylum: Arthropoda
- Class: Insecta
- Order: Lepidoptera
- Family: Crambidae
- Genus: Prenesta
- Species: P. philinoralis

Binomial name
- Prenesta philinoralis (Walker, 1859)

Synonyms
- Botys philinoralis Walker, 1859; Botys gealis Walker, 1859; Goniorhynchus philenoralis Hampson, 1899

Species of moth

Prenesta philinoralis is a moth in the family Crambidae. It was described by Francis Walker in 1859. It is found in Jamaica.
