= Pryteria apicella =

Scientific classification
- Domain: Eukaryota
- Kingdom: Animalia
- Phylum: Arthropoda
- Class: Insecta
- Order: Lepidoptera
- Superfamily: Noctuoidea
- Family: Erebidae
- Subfamily: Arctiinae
- Genus: Pryteria
- Species: P. apicella

Binomial name
- Pryteria apicella (Strand, 1919)

Synonyms
- Automolis apicella Strand, 1919; Automolis semicostalis apicalis Rothschild, 1909 (preocc. Walker, 1854); Automolis albiapicalis Hampson, 1920

Species of moth

Pryteria apicella is a moth in the family Erebidae. It was described by Embrik Strand in 1919. It is found in Bolivia.
