= Cliniodes underwoodi =

Scientific classification
- Domain: Eukaryota
- Kingdom: Animalia
- Phylum: Arthropoda
- Class: Insecta
- Order: Lepidoptera
- Family: Crambidae
- Genus: Cliniodes
- Species: C. underwoodi

Binomial name
- Cliniodes underwoodi H. Druce, 1899

Synonyms
- Cliniodes mossalis Dyar, 1914

Species of moth

Cliniodes underwoodi is a moth in the family Crambidae. It was described by Herbert Druce in 1899. It is found in Costa Rica, Nicaragua and Mexico (north to Michoacan). It is also found on Jamaica.

Adults have been recorded on wing year round except December.
