= Cliniodes nacrealis =

Scientific classification
- Domain: Eukaryota
- Kingdom: Animalia
- Phylum: Arthropoda
- Class: Insecta
- Order: Lepidoptera
- Family: Crambidae
- Genus: Cliniodes
- Species: C. nacrealis

Binomial name
- Cliniodes nacrealis Munroe, 1964

Species of moth

Cliniodes nacrealis is a moth in the family Crambidae. It was described by Eugene G. Munroe in 1964. It is found in Cuba, on Hispaniola and in Puerto Rico.
