= Phaedropsis venadialis =

Scientific classification
- Kingdom: Animalia
- Phylum: Arthropoda
- Class: Insecta
- Order: Lepidoptera
- Family: Crambidae
- Genus: Phaedropsis
- Species: P. venadialis

Binomial name
- Phaedropsis venadialis (Schaus, 1920)

Synonyms
- Lygropia venadialis Schaus, 1920

Species of moth

Phaedropsis venadialis is a species of moth in the family Crambidae. It was described by Schaus in 1920. It is found in Mexico (Sinaloa).

== Description ==
The wingspan is about 15 mm. The wings are yellow with black lines. The base of the costa and cell of the forewings are fuscous. There is a fine short basal streak below the cell and an antemedial line outbent in the cell, vertical below it to the inner margin, followed in the cell by a white spot edged with black.
