= Herea ruficeps =

Scientific classification
- Kingdom: Animalia
- Phylum: Arthropoda
- Clade: Pancrustacea
- Class: Insecta
- Order: Lepidoptera
- Superfamily: Noctuoidea
- Family: Erebidae
- Subfamily: Arctiinae
- Genus: Herea
- Species: H. ruficeps

Binomial name
- Herea ruficeps (Walker, 1854)

Synonyms
- Glaucopis ruficeps Walker, 1854; Cercophora collaris Herrich-Schäffer, [1855]

Species of moth

Herea ruficeps is a moth of the subfamily Arctiinae. It was described by Francis Walker in 1854. It is found in Pará, Brazil.

== Bibliography ==
- Pitkin, Brian & Jenkins, Paul. "Search results Family: Arctiidae". Butterflies and Moths of the World. Natural History Museum, London.
