= Cliniodes paranalis =

Scientific classification
- Domain: Eukaryota
- Kingdom: Animalia
- Phylum: Arthropoda
- Class: Insecta
- Order: Lepidoptera
- Family: Crambidae
- Genus: Cliniodes
- Species: C. paranalis

Binomial name
- Cliniodes paranalis Schaus, 1920

Species of moth

Cliniodes paranalis is a moth in the family Crambidae. It was described by William Schaus in 1920. It is found in southern Brazil, north to Minas Gerais.

Adults have been recorded on wing in January and from July to November.
