= Trichaea =

Scientific classification
- Domain: Eukaryota
- Kingdom: Animalia
- Phylum: Arthropoda
- Class: Insecta
- Order: Lepidoptera
- Family: Crambidae
- Subfamily: Spilomelinae
- Genus: Trichaea; Herrich-Schäffer, 1866

Synonyms
- Acridura Butler, 1875; Phryctena Oberthür, 1881

Genus of moths

Trichaea is a genus of moths of the family Crambidae described by Gottlieb August Wilhelm Herrich-Schäffer in 1866.

== Species ==
- Trichaea binigrata (Dognin, 1912)
- Trichaea caerulealis (Schaus, 1912)
- Trichaea eusebia (Druce, 1902)
- Trichaea flammeolalis (Möschler, 1890)
- Trichaea fortunata (Dognin, 1905)
- Trichaea hades Druce, 1889
- Trichaea nigrans (Druce, 1902)
- Trichaea pilicornis Herrich-Schäffer, 1866
- Trichaea pudens (Druce, 1902)
- Trichaea pulchralis (Schaus, 1912)

== Former species ==
- Trichaea glaucopidalis (Oberthür, 1881)
