= Trichaea hades =

Scientific classification
- Domain: Eukaryota
- Kingdom: Animalia
- Phylum: Arthropoda
- Class: Insecta
- Order: Lepidoptera
- Family: Crambidae
- Genus: Trichaea
- Species: T. hades

Binomial name
- Trichaea hades (H. Druce, 1889)

Synonyms
- Aegeria hades H. Druce, 1889; Nacoleia hades

Species of moth

Trichaea hades is a moth in the family Crambidae first described by Herbert Druce in 1889. It is found in the Mexican state of Tabasco and Costa Rica.
