= Pryteria alboatra =

Scientific classification
- Domain: Eukaryota
- Kingdom: Animalia
- Phylum: Arthropoda
- Class: Insecta
- Order: Lepidoptera
- Superfamily: Noctuoidea
- Family: Erebidae
- Subfamily: Arctiinae
- Genus: Pryteria
- Species: P. alboatra

Binomial name
- Pryteria alboatra (Rothschild, 1909)

Synonyms
- Automolis alboatra Rothschild, 1909; Automolis borussica Seitz, 1921; Automolis alboatra intensa Rothschild, 1935

Species of moth

Pryteria alboatra is a moth in the family Erebidae. It was described by Walter Rothschild in 1909. It is found in Costa Rica, French Guiana, Venezuela, Peru, Brazil and Bolivia.

== Subspecies ==
- Pryteria alboatra alboatra (Brazil)
- Pryteria alboatra borussica (Seitz, 1921) (Bolivia)
- Pryteria alboatra intensa (Rothschild, 1935) (Costa Rica)
