= Prenesta quadrifenestralis =

Scientific classification
- Kingdom: Animalia
- Phylum: Arthropoda
- Class: Insecta
- Order: Lepidoptera
- Family: Crambidae
- Genus: Prenesta
- Species: P. quadrifenestralis

Binomial name
- Prenesta quadrifenestralis (Herrich-Schäffer, 1871)

Synonyms
- Coenostola quadrifenestralis Herrich-Schäffer, 1871

Species of moth

Prenesta quadrifenestralis is a moth in the family Crambidae. It is found in Cuba.
