= Progona luridipennis =

Scientific classification
- Kingdom: Animalia
- Phylum: Arthropoda
- Clade: Pancrustacea
- Class: Insecta
- Order: Lepidoptera
- Superfamily: Noctuoidea
- Family: Erebidae
- Subfamily: Arctiinae
- Genus: Progona
- Species: P. luridipennis

Binomial name
- Progona luridipennis (Burmeister, 1878)

Synonyms
- Cydosia luridipennis Burmeister, 1878

Species of moth

Progona luridipennis is a moth in the subfamily Arctiinae. It was described by Hermann Burmeister in 1878. It is found in Argentina.
