= Prenesta rubralis =

Scientific classification
- Kingdom: Animalia
- Phylum: Arthropoda
- Class: Insecta
- Order: Lepidoptera
- Family: Crambidae
- Genus: Prenesta
- Species: P. rubralis

Binomial name
- Prenesta rubralis (Hampson, 1898)

Synonyms
- Trithyris rubralis Hampson, 1898

Species of moth

Prenesta rubralis is a moth in the family Crambidae described by George Hampson in 1898. It is found in Peru and Ecuador.

The wingspan is about 34 mm. Adults are dark red, with the forewings showing traces of an antemedial line, preceded by a yellowish mark in the cell. There is a distinct black-edged orange quadrate spot at the end of the cell, as well as a discoidal black lunule. The postmedial line features an orange spot on the outer side. The hindwings have a discoidal annulate spot and a curved fuscous postmedial line. Both wings have a terminal series of black points.
