= Phaedropsis beckeri =

Scientific classification
- Kingdom: Animalia
- Phylum: Arthropoda
- Class: Insecta
- Order: Lepidoptera
- Family: Crambidae
- Genus: Phaedropsis
- Species: P. beckeri

Binomial name
- Phaedropsis beckeri Munroe, 1995

Synonyms
- Trichognathos bipunctalis Amsel, 1956 (preocc. Hampson, 1895)

Species of moth

Phaedropsis beckeri is a species of moth in the family Crambidae. It was described by Eugene G. Munroe in 1995. It is found in Venezuela.
