= Phaedropsis calanticalis =

Scientific classification
- Kingdom: Animalia
- Phylum: Arthropoda
- Class: Insecta
- Order: Lepidoptera
- Family: Crambidae
- Genus: Phaedropsis
- Species: P. calanticalis

Binomial name
- Phaedropsis calanticalis (H. Druce, 1895)

Synonyms
- Agrotera calanticalis H. Druce, 1895

Species of moth

Phaedropsis calanticalis is a species of moth in the family Crambidae. It was described by Herbert Druce in 1895. It is found in Costa Rica.

The forewings and hindwings are pale yellow. The forewings are crossed by three narrow curved brown bands from the costal to the inner margin. The first near the base, the second at the end of the cell and the third submarginal. The hindwings are crossed about the middle by a narrow brown line, which extends from the costal margin to the anal angle. There is a short brown line partly crossing the wing above the apex. The marginal line is brown.
