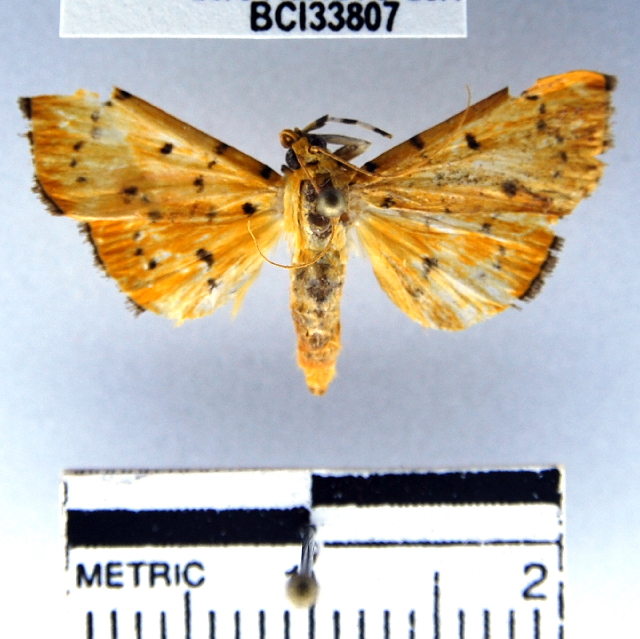

Scientific classification
- Kingdom: Animalia
- Phylum: Arthropoda
- Class: Insecta
- Order: Lepidoptera
- Family: Crambidae
- Genus: Phaedropsis
- Species: P. stictigramma

Binomial name
- Phaedropsis stictigramma (Hampson, 1912)

Synonyms
- Sylepta stictigramma Hampson, 1912; Lygropia stictigramma

= Phaedropsis stictigramma =

Species of moth

Phaedropsis stictigramma is a species of moth in the family Crambidae. It was described by George Hampson in 1912. It is found on the West Indies (the Bahamas, Cuba, Hispaniola), Florida and Central America, including Panama.

Adults are on wing from April to August and in October in Florida.

The larvae feed on the stems of Coccoloba uvifera.
