= Goniorhynchus gulielmalis =

Scientific classification
- Domain: Eukaryota
- Kingdom: Animalia
- Phylum: Arthropoda
- Class: Insecta
- Order: Lepidoptera
- Family: Crambidae
- Genus: Goniorhynchus
- Species: G. gulielmalis

Binomial name
- Goniorhynchus gulielmalis Holland, 1900

Species of moth

Goniorhynchus gulielmalis is a moth in the family Crambidae. It was described by William Jacob Holland in 1900. It is found on Buru in Indonesia.
