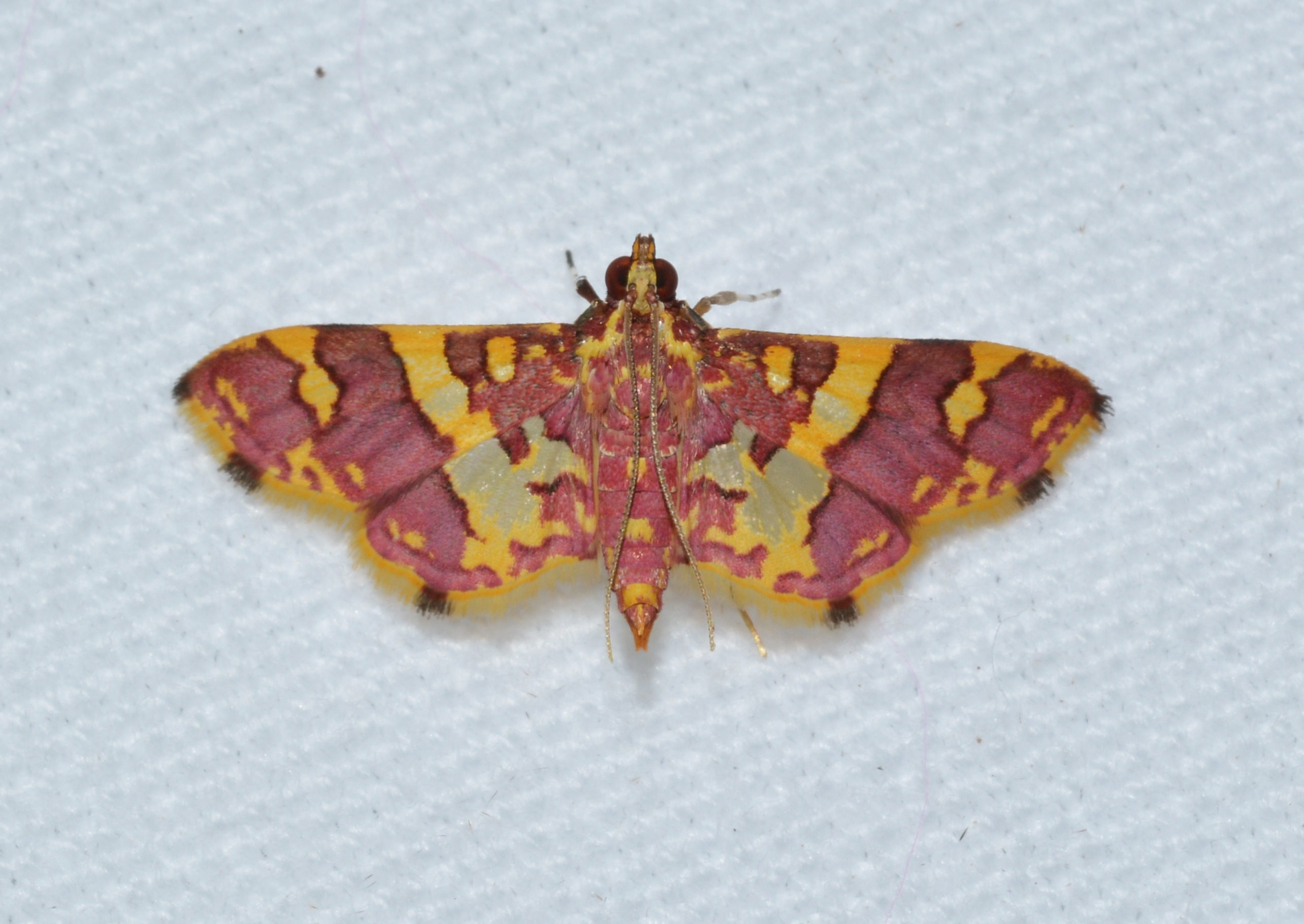

Scientific classification
- Kingdom: Animalia
- Phylum: Arthropoda
- Class: Insecta
- Order: Lepidoptera
- Family: Crambidae
- Genus: Prenesta
- Species: P. rubrocinctalis

Binomial name
- Prenesta rubrocinctalis (Guenée, 1854)

Synonyms
- Asopia rubrocinctalis Guenée, 1854; Botys geminatalis Herrich-Schäffer, 1871; Glyphodes rubrocinctalis (Guenée, 1854); Samea dilutalis Walker, 1866

= Prenesta rubrocinctalis =

Species of moth

Prenesta rubrocinctalis is a species of moth in the family Crambidae. It was first described by Achille Guenée in 1854. It is found in French Guiana, Cuba, Honduras and Costa Rica.
