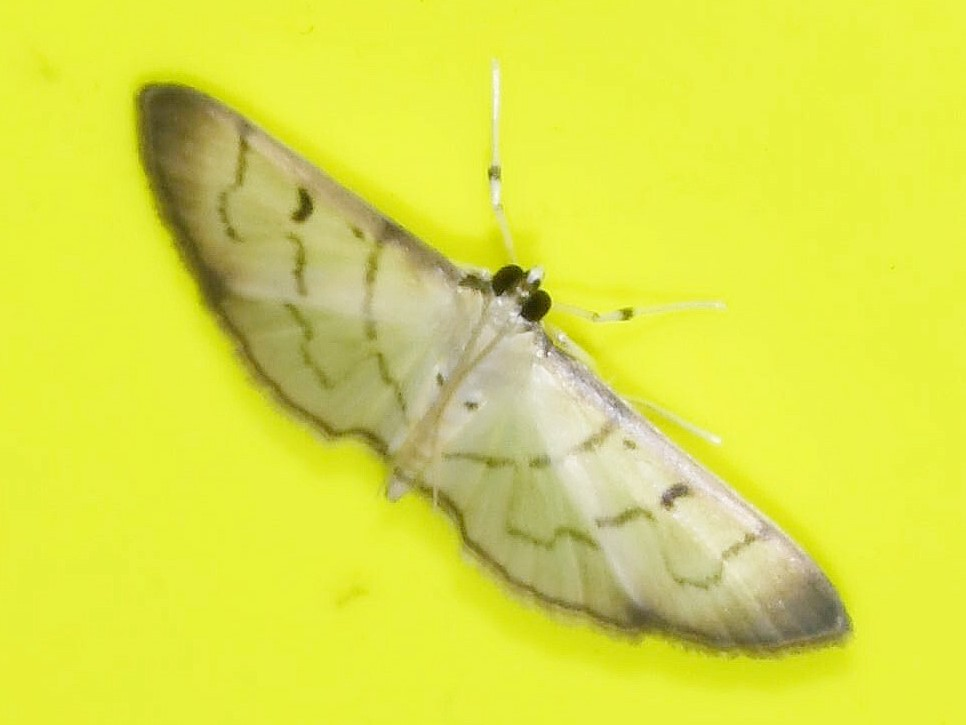

Scientific classification
- Kingdom: Animalia
- Phylum: Arthropoda
- Class: Insecta
- Order: Lepidoptera
- Family: Crambidae
- Genus: Phaedropsis
- Species: P. fuscicostalis

Binomial name
- Phaedropsis fuscicostalis (Hampson, 1895)

Synonyms
- Lygropia fuscicostalis Hampson, 1895

= Phaedropsis fuscicostalis =

Species of moth

Phaedropsis fuscicostalis is a species of moth in the family Crambidae. It was first described by George Hampson in 1895. It has been found in Grenada, Mexico, Panama and Costa Rica.
