= Goniorhynchus clausalis =

Scientific classification
- Domain: Eukaryota
- Kingdom: Animalia
- Phylum: Arthropoda
- Class: Insecta
- Order: Lepidoptera
- Family: Crambidae
- Genus: Goniorhynchus
- Species: G. clausalis

Binomial name
- Goniorhynchus clausalis (Christoph, 1881)

Synonyms
- Botys clausalis Christoph, 1881; Pyrausta andrewsalis Wileman, 1911; Pyrausta phoenizonalis Hampson, 1913; Pyrausta clausalis subclausalis Caradja & Meyrick, 1934

Species of moth

Goniorhynchus clausalis is a moth in the family Crambidae. It was described by Hugo Theodor Christoph in 1881. It is found in Japan and China.
