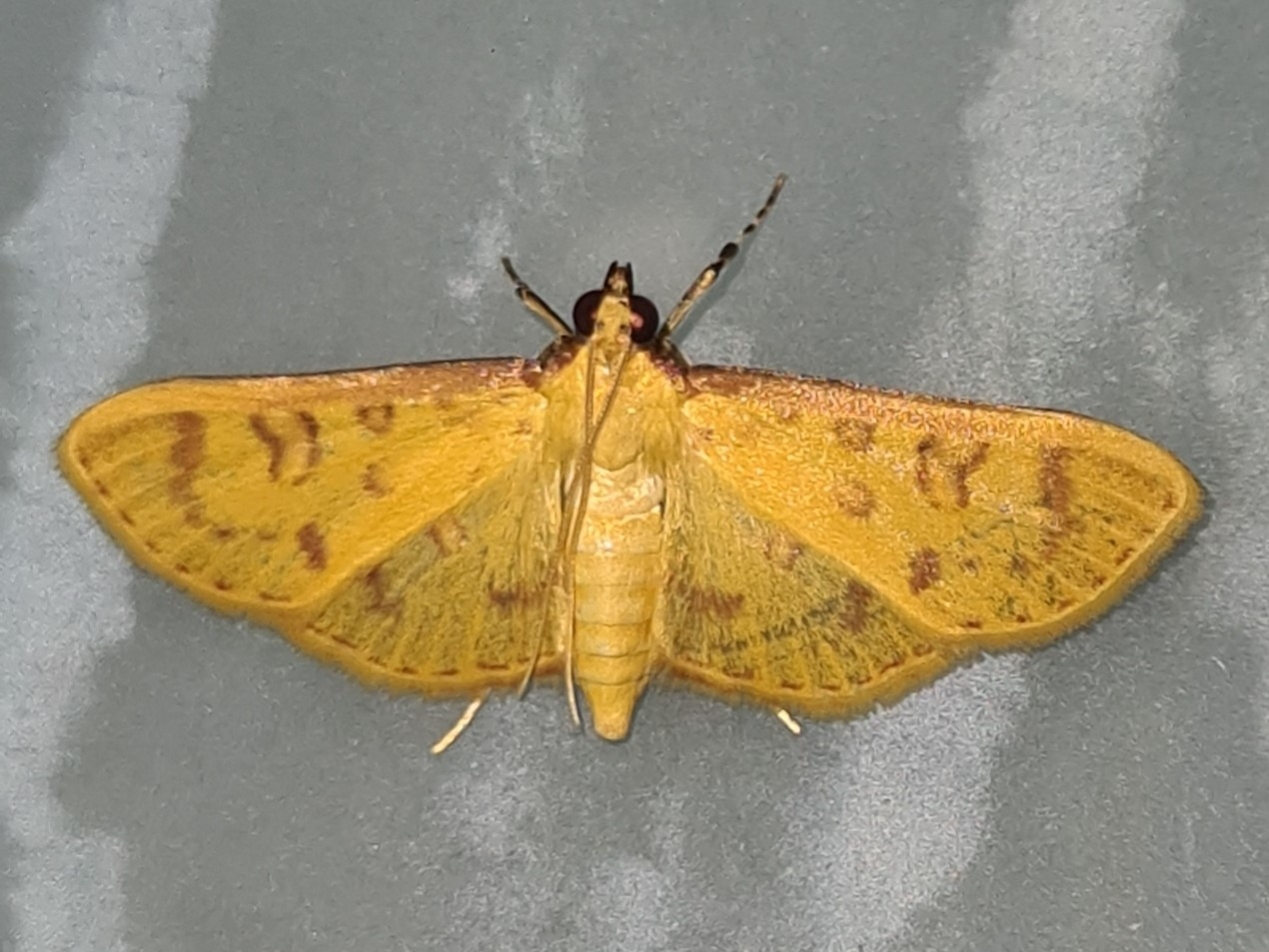

Scientific classification
- Kingdom: Animalia
- Phylum: Arthropoda
- Class: Insecta
- Order: Lepidoptera
- Family: Crambidae
- Genus: Prenesta
- Species: P. protenoralis

Binomial name
- Prenesta protenoralis (Walker, 1859)

Synonyms
- Botys protenoralis Walker, 1859

= Prenesta protenoralis =

Species of moth

Prenesta protenoralis is a species of moth in the family Crambidae. It was first described by Francis Walker in 1859. It is found in Tefé, Brazil.
