= Goniorhynchus plumbeizonalis =

Scientific classification
- Kingdom: Animalia
- Phylum: Arthropoda
- Class: Insecta
- Order: Lepidoptera
- Family: Crambidae
- Genus: Goniorhynchus
- Species: G. plumbeizonalis

Binomial name
- Goniorhynchus plumbeizonalis Hampson, 1896

Species of moth

Goniorhynchus plumbeizonalis is a moth in the family Crambidae. It was described by George Hampson in 1896. It is found in the Indian state of Meghalaya, Myanmar and Thailand.
