= Prenesta fulvirufalis =

Scientific classification
- Kingdom: Animalia
- Phylum: Arthropoda
- Class: Insecta
- Order: Lepidoptera
- Family: Crambidae
- Genus: Prenesta
- Species: P. fulvirufalis

Binomial name
- Prenesta fulvirufalis (Hampson, 1917)

Synonyms
- Trithyris fulvirufalis Hampson, 1917

Species of moth

Prenesta fulvirufalis is a moth in the family Crambidae. It is found in Peru.
