= Cliniodes festivalis =

Scientific classification
- Domain: Eukaryota
- Kingdom: Animalia
- Phylum: Arthropoda
- Class: Insecta
- Order: Lepidoptera
- Family: Crambidae
- Genus: Cliniodes
- Species: C. festivalis

Binomial name
- Cliniodes festivalis Hayden, 2011

Species of moth

Cliniodes festivalis is a moth in the family Crambidae. It was described by James E. Hayden in 2011. It is found in northern Colombia, where it has been recorded from Sierra Nevada de Santa Marta.

The length of the forewings is 19–20 millimetres (0.75–0.79 in) for males and about 19 mm for females. Adults have been recorded on wing in January, February and from July to September.

== Etymology ==
The species name refers to the colorful maculation and is derived from Latin festivus (meaning joyous).
