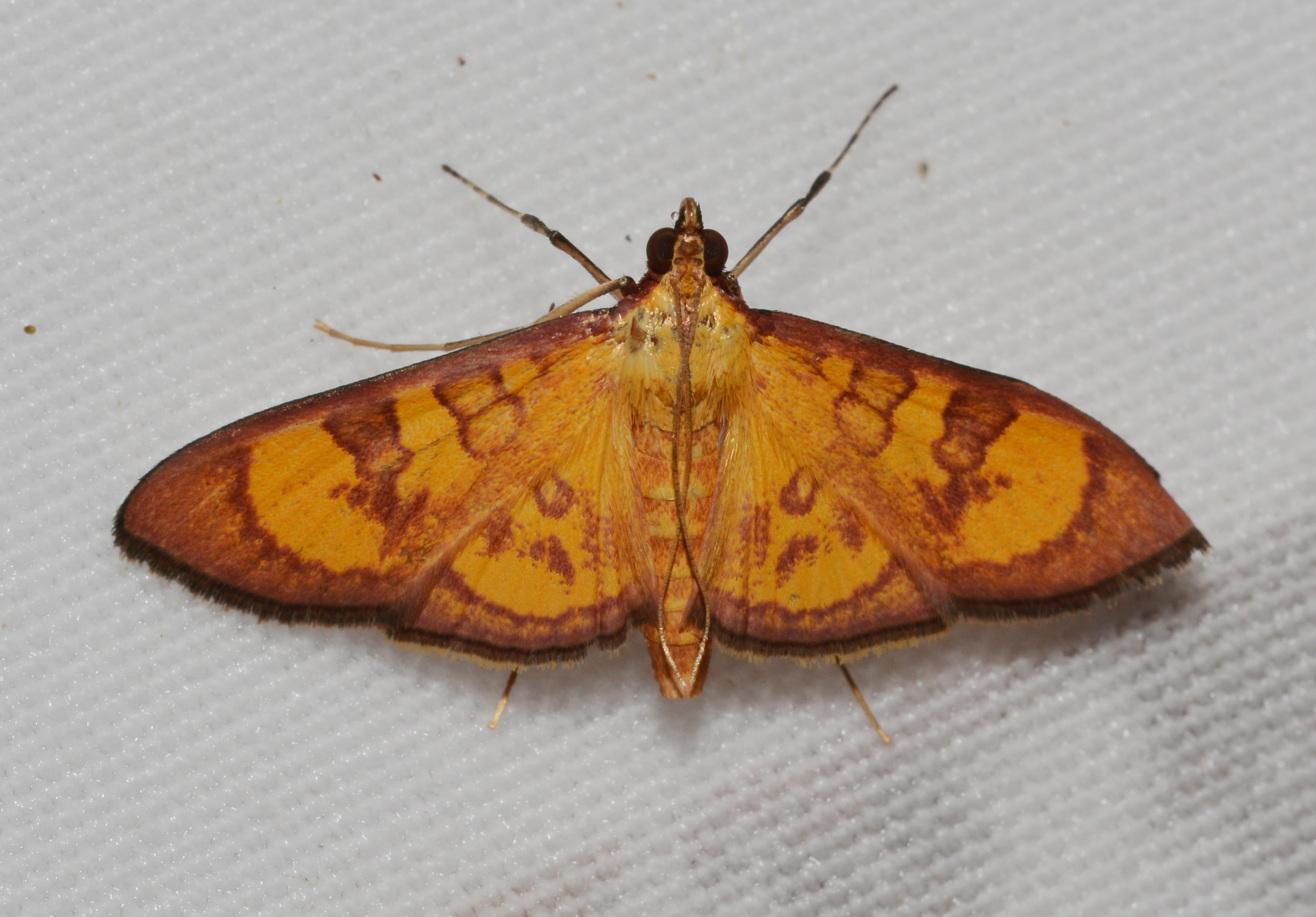
- Prenesta scyllalis

Scientific classification
- Kingdom: Animalia
- Phylum: Arthropoda
- Class: Insecta
- Order: Lepidoptera
- Family: Crambidae
- Subfamily: Spilomelinae
- Genus: Prenesta; Snellen, 1875

Synonyms
- Praenesta Hampson, 1899

= Prenesta =

Genus of moths

Prenesta is a genus of moths in the family Crambidae. The type species is Prenesta fabialis.

== Species ==
- Prenesta anaemicalis (Hampson, 1912)
- Prenesta evippealis (Walker, 1859)
- Prenesta fenestrinalis (Guenée, 1854)
- Prenesta fulvirufalis (Hampson, 1917)
- Prenesta ignefactalis (Möschler, 1886)
- Prenesta iphiclalis (Walker, 1859)
- Prenesta latifascialis (Snellen, 1875)
- Prenesta luciferalis (Möschler, 1881)
- Prenesta nysalis (Walker, 1859)
- Prenesta ornamentalis (Möschler, 1881)
- Prenesta philinoralis (Walker, 1859)
- Prenesta prosopealis (Walker, 1859)
- Prenesta protenoralis (Walker, 1859)
- Prenesta quadrifenestralis (Herrich-Schäffer, 1871)
- Prenesta rubralis (Hampson, 1898)
- Prenesta rubrocinctalis (Guenée, 1854)
- Prenesta scyllalis (Walker, 1859)
- Prenesta sunialis Snellen, 1875
