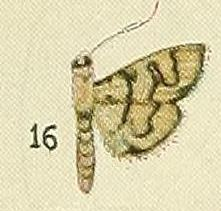

Scientific classification
- Domain: Eukaryota
- Kingdom: Animalia
- Phylum: Arthropoda
- Class: Insecta
- Order: Lepidoptera
- Family: Crambidae
- Genus: Goniorhynchus
- Species: G. pasithea

Binomial name
- Goniorhynchus pasithea (Fawcett, 1916)

Synonyms
- Lygropea pasithea Fawcett, 1916

= Goniorhynchus pasithea =

Species of moth

Goniorhynchus pasithea is a moth in the family Crambidae. It was described by James Farish Malcolm Fawcett in 1916. It is found in eastern Africa.
