= Cliniodes vinacea =

Scientific classification
- Domain: Eukaryota
- Kingdom: Animalia
- Phylum: Arthropoda
- Class: Insecta
- Order: Lepidoptera
- Family: Crambidae
- Genus: Cliniodes
- Species: C. vinacea

Binomial name
- Cliniodes vinacea Munroe, 1964

Species of moth

Cliniodes vinacea is a moth in the family Crambidae. It was described by Eugene G. Munroe in 1964. It is found in the Andes from Colombia to central Bolivia. It is also found in northern Venezuela.

The length of the forewings is 15–18 mm for males and 15–17 mm for females. Adults have been recorded on wing year round.
