= Cliniodes beckeralis =

Scientific classification
- Domain: Eukaryota
- Kingdom: Animalia
- Phylum: Arthropoda
- Class: Insecta
- Order: Lepidoptera
- Family: Crambidae
- Genus: Cliniodes
- Species: C. beckeralis

Binomial name
- Cliniodes beckeralis Hayden, 2011

Species of moth

Cliniodes beckeralis is a moth in the family Crambidae. It was described by James E. Hayden in 2011. It is found in Colima in coastal western Mexico.

The length of the forewings is about 12 mm for males and 12–14 mm for females. Adults have been recorded on wing in June.

== Etymology ==
The species is named for Dr. Vitor Osmar Becker.
