= Progona venata =

Scientific classification
- Domain: Eukaryota
- Kingdom: Animalia
- Phylum: Arthropoda
- Class: Insecta
- Order: Lepidoptera
- Superfamily: Noctuoidea
- Family: Erebidae
- Subfamily: Arctiinae
- Genus: Progona
- Species: P. venata

Binomial name
- Progona venata Schaus, 1921

Species of moth

Progona venata is a moth in the subfamily Arctiinae. It was described by William Schaus in 1921. It is found in Paraguay.
