= Trichaea fortunata =

Scientific classification
- Domain: Eukaryota
- Kingdom: Animalia
- Phylum: Arthropoda
- Class: Insecta
- Order: Lepidoptera
- Family: Crambidae
- Genus: Trichaea
- Species: T. fortunata

Binomial name
- Trichaea fortunata (Dognin, 1905)

Synonyms
- Acridura fortunata Dognin, 1905

Species of moth

Trichaea fortunata is a moth in the family Crambidae. It was described by Paul Dognin in 1905. It is found in Bolivia.
