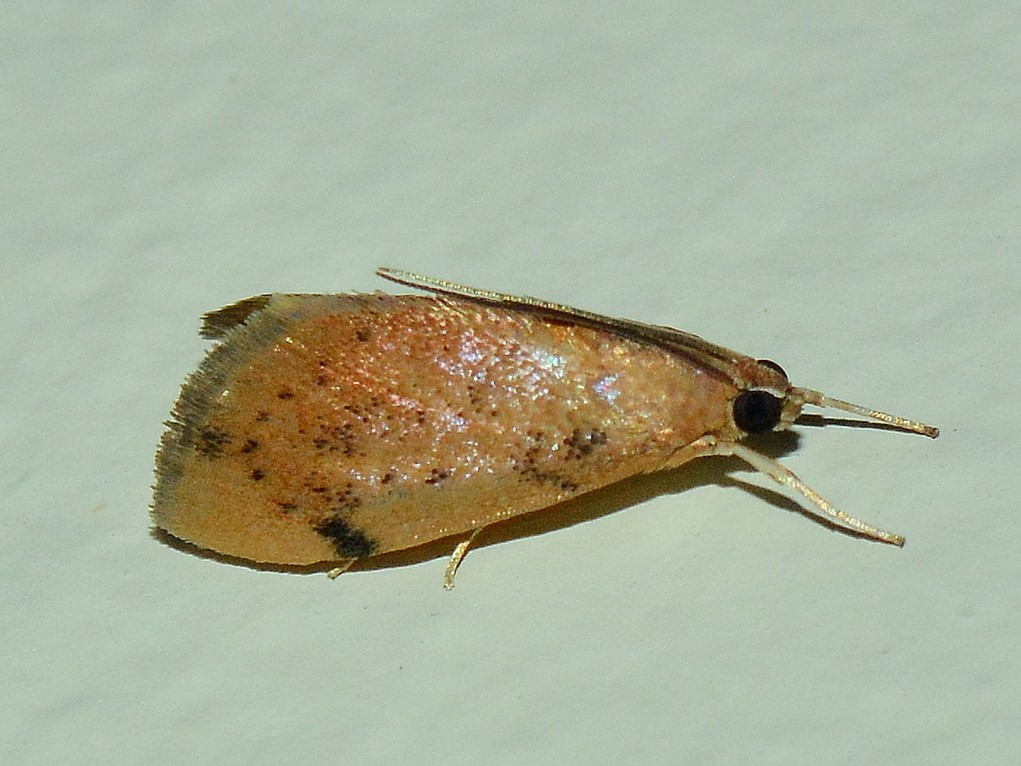

Scientific classification
- Kingdom: Animalia
- Phylum: Arthropoda
- Clade: Pancrustacea
- Class: Insecta
- Order: Lepidoptera
- Family: Crambidae
- Genus: Cliniodes
- Species: C. insignialis

Binomial name
- Cliniodes insignialis Hayden, 2011

= Cliniodes insignialis =

Species of moth

Cliniodes insignialis is a species of moth that belongs to the family Crambidae. It is found in southern Brazil, north to Rio de Janeiro. This species was first described by James E. Hayden in 2011.

Adults have been recorded on wing nearly year round, except August.
