= Phaedropsis strigilalis =

Scientific classification
- Kingdom: Animalia
- Phylum: Arthropoda
- Class: Insecta
- Order: Lepidoptera
- Family: Crambidae
- Genus: Phaedropsis
- Species: P. strigilalis

Binomial name
- Phaedropsis strigilalis (Hampson, 1899)

Synonyms
- Lygropia strigilalis Hampson, 1899

Species of moth

Phaedropsis strigilalis is a species of moth in the family Crambidae. It was described by George Hampson in 1899. It is found in Espírito Santo, Brazil.
