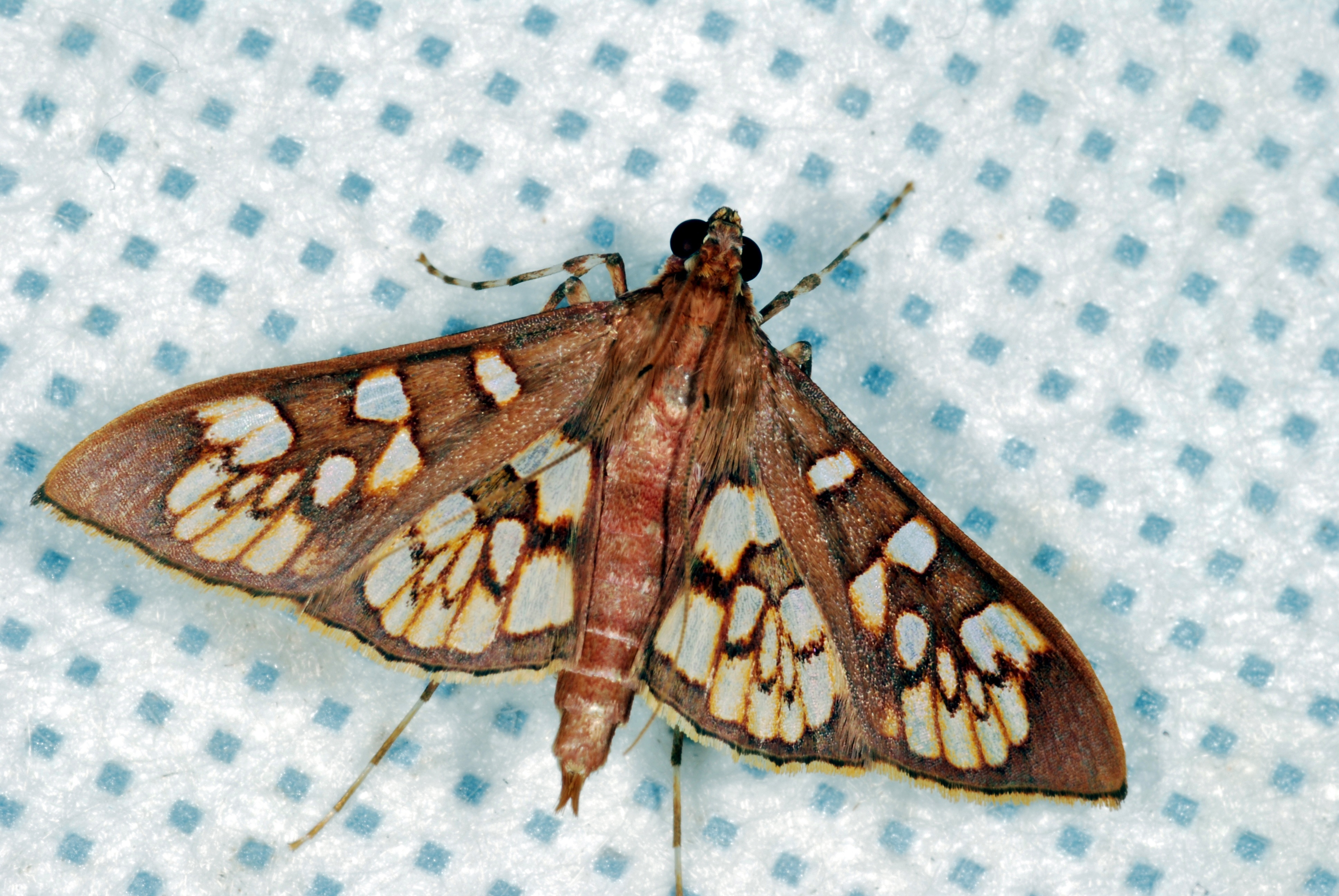

Scientific classification
- Kingdom: Animalia
- Phylum: Arthropoda
- Class: Insecta
- Order: Lepidoptera
- Family: Crambidae
- Genus: Prenesta
- Species: P. fenestrinalis

Binomial name
- Prenesta fenestrinalis (Guenée, 1854)

Synonyms
- Botys fenestrinalis Guenée, 1854

= Prenesta fenestrinalis =

Species of moth

Prenesta fenestrinalis is a moth in the family Crambidae. It was described by Achille Guenée in 1854. It is found in Brazil, Costa Rica and Mexico.
