= Phaedropsis flavipennis =

Scientific classification
- Kingdom: Animalia
- Phylum: Arthropoda
- Class: Insecta
- Order: Lepidoptera
- Family: Crambidae
- Genus: Phaedropsis
- Species: P. flavipennis

Binomial name
- Phaedropsis flavipennis (Kaye, 1901)

Synonyms
- Sylepta flavipennis Kaye, 1901

Species of moth

Phaedropsis flavipennis is a species of moth in the family Crambidae. It was described by William James Kaye in 1901. It is found in Trinidad.
