= Goniorhynchus gratalis =

Scientific classification
- Kingdom: Animalia
- Phylum: Arthropoda
- Class: Insecta
- Order: Lepidoptera
- Family: Crambidae
- Genus: Goniorhynchus
- Species: G. gratalis

Binomial name
- Goniorhynchus gratalis (Lederer, 1863)

Synonyms
- Botys gratalis Lederer, 1863; Botys minualis Walker, [1866]

Species of moth

Goniorhynchus gratalis is a moth in the family Crambidae. It was described by Julius Lederer in 1863. It is found in Indonesia (Ambon Island, Java), north-eastern India, Burma
