= Cliniodes latipennis =

Scientific classification
- Domain: Eukaryota
- Kingdom: Animalia
- Phylum: Arthropoda
- Class: Insecta
- Order: Lepidoptera
- Family: Crambidae
- Genus: Cliniodes
- Species: C. latipennis

Binomial name
- Cliniodes latipennis Munroe, 1964

Species of moth

Cliniodes latipennis is a moth in the family Crambidae. It was described by Eugene G. Munroe in 1964. It is found in southern Brazil, north to Minas Gerais.
