= Goniorhynchus obscurus =

Scientific classification
- Kingdom: Animalia
- Phylum: Arthropoda
- Class: Insecta
- Order: Lepidoptera
- Family: Crambidae
- Genus: Goniorhynchus
- Species: G. obscurus

Binomial name
- Goniorhynchus obscurus Hampson, 1898

Species of moth

Goniorhynchus obscurus is a moth in the family Crambidae. It was described by George Hampson in 1898. It is found on Ambon Island in Indonesia.
