= Prenesta latifascialis =

Scientific classification
- Kingdom: Animalia
- Phylum: Arthropoda
- Class: Insecta
- Order: Lepidoptera
- Family: Crambidae
- Genus: Prenesta
- Species: P. latifascialis

Binomial name
- Prenesta latifascialis (Snellen, 1875)

Synonyms
- Syllepis latifascialis Snellen, 1875

Species of moth

Prenesta latifascialis is a moth in the family Crambidae. It is found in Colombia.
