= Trichaea nigrans =

Scientific classification
- Domain: Eukaryota
- Kingdom: Animalia
- Phylum: Arthropoda
- Class: Insecta
- Order: Lepidoptera
- Family: Crambidae
- Genus: Trichaea
- Species: T. nigrans

Binomial name
- Trichaea nigrans (H. Druce, 1902)

Synonyms
- Acridura nigrans H. Druce, 1902

Species of moth

Trichaea nigrans is a moth in the family Crambidae. It was described by Herbert Druce in 1902. It is found in Peru and Bolivia.

The forewings and hindwings are hyaline bluish white, the veins black and the costal margin, apex outer and inner margins of both wings purplish black.
