= Cliniodes additalis =

Scientific classification
- Domain: Eukaryota
- Kingdom: Animalia
- Phylum: Arthropoda
- Class: Insecta
- Order: Lepidoptera
- Family: Crambidae
- Genus: Cliniodes
- Species: C. additalis

Binomial name
- Cliniodes additalis Hayden, 2011

Species of moth

Cliniodes additalis is a moth in the family Crambidae. It was described by James E. Hayden in 2011. It is found in Mexico, where it has been recorded from San Luis Potosí.

The length of the forewings is about 14 mm.
