= Pryteria hamifera =

Scientific classification
- Domain: Eukaryota
- Kingdom: Animalia
- Phylum: Arthropoda
- Class: Insecta
- Order: Lepidoptera
- Superfamily: Noctuoidea
- Family: Erebidae
- Subfamily: Arctiinae
- Genus: Pryteria
- Species: P. hamifera

Binomial name
- Pryteria hamifera (Dognin, 1907)

Synonyms
- Automolis hamifera Dognin, 1907

Species of moth

Pryteria hamifera is a moth in the family Erebidae. It was described by Paul Dognin in 1907. It is found in French Guiana, Guyana and Bolivia.
