= Phaedropsis impeditalis =

Scientific classification
- Kingdom: Animalia
- Phylum: Arthropoda
- Class: Insecta
- Order: Lepidoptera
- Family: Crambidae
- Genus: Phaedropsis
- Species: P. impeditalis

Binomial name
- Phaedropsis impeditalis (Herrich-Schäffer, 1871)

Synonyms
- Botys impeditalis Herrich-Schäffer, 1871

Species of moth

Phaedropsis impeditalis is a species of moth in the family Crambidae. It was described by Gottlieb August Wilhelm Herrich-Schäffer in 1871. It is found in Cuba.
