= Pryteria =

Scientific classification
- Domain: Eukaryota
- Kingdom: Animalia
- Phylum: Arthropoda
- Class: Insecta
- Order: Lepidoptera
- Superfamily: Noctuoidea
- Family: Erebidae
- Subfamily: Arctiinae
- Subtribe: Phaegopterina
- Genus: Pryteria; Möschler, 1883

Genus of moths

Pryteria is a genus of moths in the family Erebidae.

== Species ==
- Pryteria apicata Schaus, 1905
- Pryteria apicella Strand, 1919
- Pryteria alboatra Rothschild, 1909
- Pryteria colombiana Rothschild, 1933
- Pryteria costata Möschler, 1882
- Pryteria hamifera Dognin, 1907
- Pryteria semicostalis Rothschild, 1909
- Pryteria unifascia Druce, 1899
