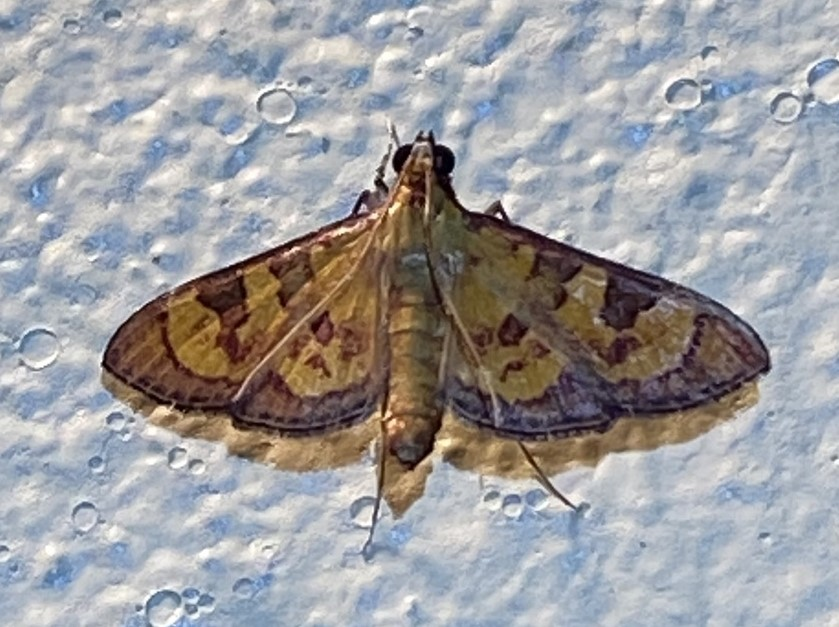

Scientific classification
- Kingdom: Animalia
- Phylum: Arthropoda
- Class: Insecta
- Order: Lepidoptera
- Family: Crambidae
- Genus: Prenesta
- Species: P. sunialis

Binomial name
- Prenesta sunialis Snellen, 1875

= Prenesta sunialis =

Species of moth

Prenesta sunialis is a species of moth in the family Crambidae. It is found in Colombia.
