= Pryteria unifascia =

Scientific classification
- Domain: Eukaryota
- Kingdom: Animalia
- Phylum: Arthropoda
- Class: Insecta
- Order: Lepidoptera
- Superfamily: Noctuoidea
- Family: Erebidae
- Subfamily: Arctiinae
- Genus: Pryteria
- Species: P. unifascia

Binomial name
- Pryteria unifascia (H. Druce, 1899)

Synonyms
- Sallaea unifascia H. Druce, 1899; Pryteria unifascia f. ilicis Jörgensen, 1932; Automolis unifascia tenuis Rothschild, 1935

Species of moth

Pryteria unifascia is a moth in the family Erebidae. It was described by Herbert Druce in 1899. It is found in Guyana and Belize.

== Subspecies ==
- Pryteria unifascia unifascia (Guyana)
- Pryteria unifascia tenuis (Rothschild, 1935) (Belize)
