= Goniorhynchus marasmialis =

Scientific classification
- Kingdom: Animalia
- Phylum: Arthropoda
- Class: Insecta
- Order: Lepidoptera
- Family: Crambidae
- Genus: Goniorhynchus
- Species: G. marasmialis

Binomial name
- Goniorhynchus marasmialis Hampson, 1898

Species of moth

Goniorhynchus marasmialis is a moth in the family Crambidae. It was described by George Hampson in 1898. It is found on the islands of Bali and Timor in Maritime Southeast Asia.
