= Prenesta prosopealis =

Scientific classification
- Kingdom: Animalia
- Phylum: Arthropoda
- Class: Insecta
- Order: Lepidoptera
- Family: Crambidae
- Genus: Prenesta
- Species: P. prosopealis

Binomial name
- Prenesta prosopealis (Walker, 1859)

Synonyms
- Salbia prosopealis Walker, 1859

Species of moth

Prenesta prosopealis is a moth in the family Crambidae. It was described by Francis Walker in 1859. It is found in Jamaica.
