= Trichaea eusebia =

Scientific classification
- Domain: Eukaryota
- Kingdom: Animalia
- Phylum: Arthropoda
- Class: Insecta
- Order: Lepidoptera
- Family: Crambidae
- Genus: Trichaea
- Species: T. eusebia

Binomial name
- Trichaea eusebia (H. Druce, 1902)

Synonyms
- Acridura eusebia H. Druce, 1902

Species of moth

Trichaea eusebia is a moth in the family Crambidae. It was described by Herbert Druce in 1902. It is found in Ecuador.

The forewings are semihyaline greyish white, the costal margin from the base to the end of the cell bright yellow. The veins, apex and outer margin are black. The hindwings are semihyaline greyish white, the veins and margins black.
