= Goniorhynchus calamitalis =

Scientific classification
- Kingdom: Animalia
- Phylum: Arthropoda
- Class: Insecta
- Order: Lepidoptera
- Family: Crambidae
- Genus: Goniorhynchus
- Species: G. calamitalis

Binomial name
- Goniorhynchus calamitalis (Snellen, 1898)

Synonyms
- Botys calamitalis Snellen, 1898

Species of moth

Goniorhynchus calamitalis is a moth in the family Crambidae. It was described by Snellen in 1898. It is found in Indonesia (Lombok, Java).
