= Phaedropsis domingalis =

Scientific classification
- Kingdom: Animalia
- Phylum: Arthropoda
- Class: Insecta
- Order: Lepidoptera
- Family: Crambidae
- Genus: Phaedropsis
- Species: P. domingalis

Binomial name
- Phaedropsis domingalis (Schaus, 1920)

Synonyms
- Lygropia domingalis Schaus, 1920

Species of moth

Phaedropsis domingalis is a species of moth in the family Crambidae. It was described by William Schaus in 1920. It is found in the Dominican Republic.

== Description ==
The wingspan is about 24 mm. The wings are orange yellow, the forewings with a black line across the costa and the cell near the base, as well as a subbasal black point on the inner margin. There is an antemedial black line on the costa and a medial point below the cell, as well as a thick black line on the discocellular. There are also fine and faint postmedial streaks on the costa. There is a small fuscous spot medially below vein 2 on the hindwings.
