= Goniorhynchus hampsoni =

Scientific classification
- Domain: Eukaryota
- Kingdom: Animalia
- Phylum: Arthropoda
- Class: Insecta
- Order: Lepidoptera
- Family: Crambidae
- Genus: Goniorhynchus
- Species: G. hampsoni

Binomial name
- Goniorhynchus hampsoni Klima, 1939

Synonyms
- Goniorhynchus marginalis Hampson, 1912 (nec. Warren, 1895)

Species of moth

Goniorhynchus hampsoni is a moth in the family Crambidae. It is found in Peru and Costa Rica.
