= Herea abdominalis =

Scientific classification
- Kingdom: Animalia
- Phylum: Arthropoda
- Clade: Pancrustacea
- Class: Insecta
- Order: Lepidoptera
- Superfamily: Noctuoidea
- Family: Erebidae
- Subfamily: Arctiinae
- Genus: Herea
- Species: H. abdominalis

Binomial name
- Herea abdominalis (Gaede, 1926)

Synonyms
- Desmidocnemis abdominalis Gaede, 1926

Species of moth

Herea abdominalis is a moth of the subfamily Arctiinae. It was described by Max Gaede in 1926. It is found in Bolivia.
