= Cliniodes mellalis =

Scientific classification
- Domain: Eukaryota
- Kingdom: Animalia
- Phylum: Arthropoda
- Class: Insecta
- Order: Lepidoptera
- Family: Crambidae
- Genus: Cliniodes
- Species: C. mellalis

Binomial name
- Cliniodes mellalis Hayden, 2011

Species of moth

Cliniodes mellalis is a moth in the family Crambidae. It was described by James E. Hayden in 2011. It is found in Costa Rica.

Adults have been recorded on wing in February, April and from August to November.
