= Cliniodes ineptalis =

Scientific classification
- Domain: Eukaryota
- Kingdom: Animalia
- Phylum: Arthropoda
- Class: Insecta
- Order: Lepidoptera
- Family: Crambidae
- Genus: Cliniodes
- Species: C. ineptalis

Binomial name
- Cliniodes ineptalis (Lederer, 1863)

Synonyms
- Exarcha ineptalis Lederer, 1863

Species of moth

Cliniodes ineptalis is a moth in the family Crambidae. It was described by Julius Lederer in 1863. It is found in Venezuela and Colombia.

The length of the forewings is about 24 mm. Adults have been recorded on wing in August and September.
