= Progona xanthura =

Scientific classification
- Domain: Eukaryota
- Kingdom: Animalia
- Phylum: Arthropoda
- Class: Insecta
- Order: Lepidoptera
- Superfamily: Noctuoidea
- Family: Erebidae
- Subfamily: Arctiinae
- Genus: Progona
- Species: P. xanthura

Binomial name
- Progona xanthura (Schaus, 1899)

Synonyms
- Parablavia xanthura Schaus, 1899

Species of moth

Progona xanthura is a moth in the subfamily Arctiinae. It was described by Schaus in 1899. It is found in Brazil.
