= Goniorhynchus marginalis =

Scientific classification
- Domain: Eukaryota
- Kingdom: Animalia
- Phylum: Arthropoda
- Class: Insecta
- Order: Lepidoptera
- Family: Crambidae
- Genus: Goniorhynchus
- Species: G. marginalis

Binomial name
- Goniorhynchus marginalis Warren, 1896

Species of moth

Goniorhynchus marginalis is a moth in the family Crambidae. It was described by Warren in 1896. It is found in India (Khasi Hills).
