= Phaedropsis maritzalis =

Scientific classification
- Kingdom: Animalia
- Phylum: Arthropoda
- Class: Insecta
- Order: Lepidoptera
- Family: Crambidae
- Genus: Phaedropsis
- Species: P. maritzalis

Binomial name
- Phaedropsis maritzalis (Schaus, 1920)

Synonyms
- Lygropia maritzalis Schaus, 1920

Species of moth

Phaedropsis maritzalis is a species of moth in the family Crambidae. It was described by William Schaus in 1920. It has been found in Guatemala, Honduras and Venezuela.

== Description ==
The wingspan is about 29 mm. The wings are bright orange with black markings. There is a subbasal spot on the costa of the forewings, as well as a more remote spot on the inner margin and an antemedial spot on the costa entering the cell as a line. There is an outset vertical line below the cell, and a similar line from vein 1 to the inner margin, as well as a thick line on the discocellular and an outbent postmedial line across the costal margin. On the hindwings, there is a postmedial series of spots.
