= Trichaea pilicornis =

Scientific classification
- Domain: Eukaryota
- Kingdom: Animalia
- Phylum: Arthropoda
- Class: Insecta
- Order: Lepidoptera
- Family: Crambidae
- Genus: Trichaea
- Species: T. pilicornis

Binomial name
- Trichaea pilicornis Herrich-Schäffer, 1866

Synonyms
- Acridura gryllina Butler, 1875; Trichaea gryllina; Acridura metallica Butler, 1875; Acridura prochyta Druce, 1895; Phryctena glaucopidalis Oberthür, 1881; Trichaea seticornis Herrich-Schäffer, 1866

Species of moth

Trichaea pilicornis is a moth in the family Crambidae. It was described by Gottlieb August Wilhelm Herrich-Schäffer in 1866. It is found in Mexico (Veracruz, Jalapa), Guatemala, Panama, Honduras, Costa Rica, Cuba, Ecuador, French Guiana, Brazil and Argentina.
