= Phaedropsis simplalis =

Scientific classification
- Kingdom: Animalia
- Phylum: Arthropoda
- Class: Insecta
- Order: Lepidoptera
- Family: Crambidae
- Genus: Phaedropsis
- Species: P. simplalis

Binomial name
- Phaedropsis simplalis (Guenée, 1854)

Synonyms
- Asopia simplalis Guenée, 1854

Species of moth

Phaedropsis simplalis is a species of moth in the family Crambidae. It was described by Achille Guenée in 1854. It is found in Brazil.
