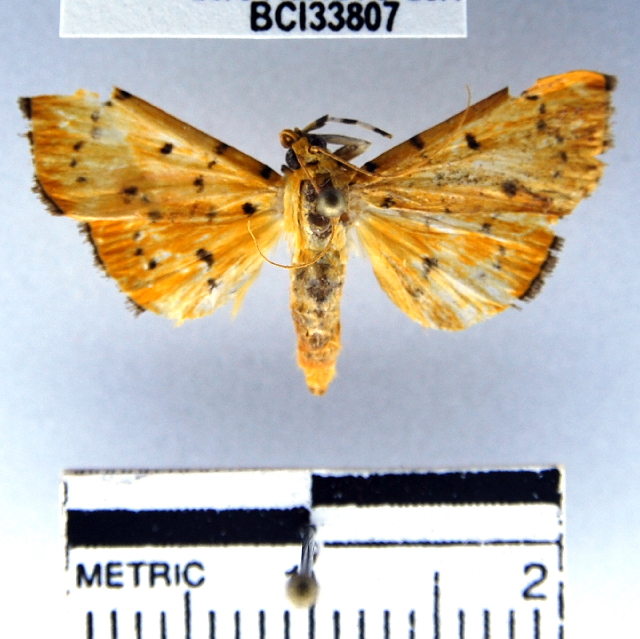
- Phaedropsis stictigramma

Scientific classification
- Kingdom: Animalia
- Phylum: Arthropoda
- Class: Insecta
- Order: Lepidoptera
- Family: Crambidae
- Subfamily: Spilomelinae
- Tribe: Agroterini
- Genus: Phaedropsis; Warren, 1890

Synonyms
- Trichognathos Amsel, 1956; Trichognathus Edwards & Vevers, 1975

= Phaedropsis =

Genus of moths

Phaedropsis is a genus of moths in the family Crambidae.

== Species ==
- Phaedropsis alitemeralis (Dyar, 1914)
- Phaedropsis beckeri Munroe, 1995
- Phaedropsis bipunctalis (Hampson, 1895)
- Phaedropsis calanticalis (Druce, 1895)
- Phaedropsis chromalis (Guenée, 1854)
- Phaedropsis collustralis (Möschler, 1886)
- Phaedropsis domingalis (Schaus, 1920)
- Phaedropsis flavipennis (Kaye, 1901)
- Phaedropsis fuscicostalis (Hampson, 1895)
- Phaedropsis glutalis (Möschler, 1881)
- Phaedropsis hecalialis (Walker, 1859)
- Phaedropsis illepidalis (Herrich-Schäffer, 1871)
- Phaedropsis illustralis (Dognin, 1913)
- Phaedropsis impeditalis (Herrich-Schäffer, 1871)
- Phaedropsis leialis (Dognin, 1906)
- Phaedropsis maritzalis (Schaus, 1920)
- Phaedropsis meropialis (Möschler, 1886)
- Phaedropsis placendalis (Möschler, 1890)
- Phaedropsis principaloides (Möschler, 1890)
- Phaedropsis principialis (Lederer, 1863)
- Phaedropsis simplalis (Guenée, 1854)
- Phaedropsis stictigramma (Hampson, 1912)
- Phaedropsis strigilalis (Hampson, 1899)
- Phaedropsis venadialis (Schaus, 1920)
