= Pseudometachilo faunellus =

Scientific classification
- Domain: Eukaryota
- Kingdom: Animalia
- Phylum: Arthropoda
- Class: Insecta
- Order: Lepidoptera
- Family: Crambidae
- Subfamily: Crambinae
- Tribe: incertae sedis
- Genus: Pseudometachilo
- Species: P. faunellus

Binomial name
- Pseudometachilo faunellus (Schaus in Dyar, 1911)

Synonyms
- Crambus faunellus Schaus in Dyar, 1911

Species of moth

Pseudometachilo faunellus is a moth in the family Crambidae. It was described by Schaus in 1911. It is found in Brazil (São Paulo).
