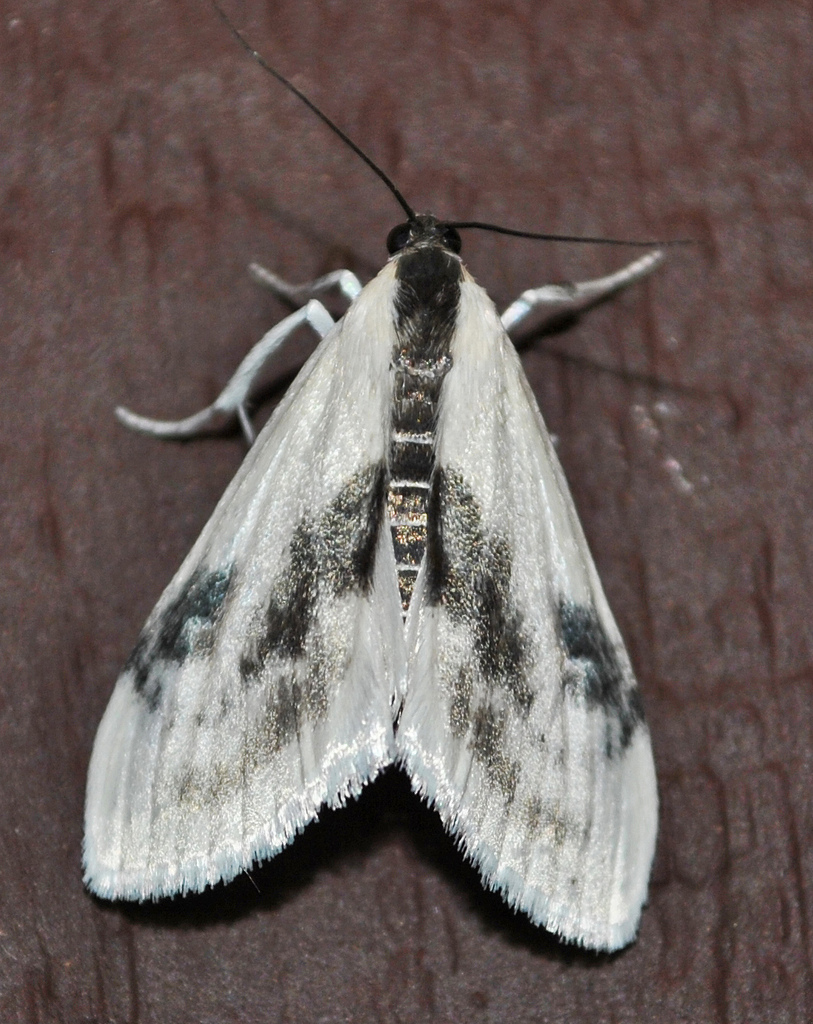
- Cliniodes ostreonalis

Scientific classification
- Domain: Eukaryota
- Kingdom: Animalia
- Phylum: Arthropoda
- Class: Insecta
- Order: Lepidoptera
- Family: Crambidae
- Tribe: Eurrhypini
- Genus: Cliniodes; Guenée, 1854

Synonyms
- Basonga Möschler, 1886; Exarcha Lederer, 1863; Idessa Walker, 1859; Metrea Grote, 1882; Procliniodes Hayden, 2011

= Cliniodes =

Genus of moths

Cliniodes is a genus of moths of the family Crambidae described by Achille Guenée in 1854.

== Species ==
- subgenus Procliniodes Hayden, 2011
  - Cliniodes costimacula (Hampson, 1913)
  - Cliniodes insignialis Hayden, 2011
  - Cliniodes mellalis Hayden, 2011
- subgenus Metrea Grote, 1882
  - Cliniodes beckeralis Hayden, 2011
  - Cliniodes glaucescens (Hampson, 1899)
  - Cliniodes latipennis Munroe, 1964
  - Cliniodes ostreonalis (Grote, 1882)
  - Cliniodes rubialalis Dognin, 1897
  - Cliniodes seriopunctalis Hampson, 1913
- subgenus Cliniodes
  - paradisalis species group
    - Cliniodes paradisalis (Möschler, 1886)
  - euphrosinalis species group
    - Cliniodes euphrosinalis Möschler, 1886
    - Cliniodes nacrealis Munroe, 1964
    - Cliniodes paranalis Schaus, 1920
    - Cliniodes subflavescens Hayden, 2011
    - Cliniodes underwoodi Druce, 1899
  - opalalis species group
    - Cliniodes additalis Hayden, 2011
    - Cliniodes festivalis Hayden, 2011
    - Cliniodes ineptalis (Lederer, 1863)
    - Cliniodes inferalis Hayden, 2011
    - Cliniodes iopolia Hayden, 2011
    - Cliniodes malleri Munroe, 1964
    - Cliniodes opalalis Guenée, 1854
    - Cliniodes opertalis Hayden, 2011
    - Cliniodes saburralis Guenée, 1854
    - Cliniodes semilunalis Möschler, 1890
    - Cliniodes superbalis Dognin, 1911
    - Cliniodes vinacea Munroe, 1964
- unplaced
  - Cliniodes muralis Hayden, 2011

== Former species ==
- Cliniodes cyllarusalis Druce, 1895
- Cliniodes mossalis Dyar, 1914
- Cliniodes nomadalis Dyar, 1912
- Cliniodes paucilinealis Snellen, 1895
