= Trichaea caerulealis =

Scientific classification
- Domain: Eukaryota
- Kingdom: Animalia
- Phylum: Arthropoda
- Class: Insecta
- Order: Lepidoptera
- Family: Crambidae
- Genus: Trichaea
- Species: T. caerulealis

Binomial name
- Trichaea caerulealis (Schaus, 1912)

Synonyms
- Acridura caerulealis Schaus, 1912

Species of moth

Trichaea caerulealis is a moth in the family Crambidae. It is found in Costa Rica.
