= Pseudometachilo =

Scientific classification
- Domain: Eukaryota
- Kingdom: Animalia
- Phylum: Arthropoda
- Class: Insecta
- Order: Lepidoptera
- Family: Crambidae
- Subfamily: Crambinae
- Tribe: incertae sedis
- Genus: Pseudometachilo; Bleszynski, 1962

Genus of moths

Pseudometachilo is a genus of moths of the family Crambidae.

== Species ==
- Pseudometachilo delius Bleszynski, 1966
- Pseudometachilo faunellus (Schaus in Dyar, 1911)
- Pseudometachilo irrectellus (Möschler, 1882)
- Pseudometachilo subfaunellus Bleszynski, 1967
