= Pryteria semicostalis =

Scientific classification
- Domain: Eukaryota
- Kingdom: Animalia
- Phylum: Arthropoda
- Class: Insecta
- Order: Lepidoptera
- Superfamily: Noctuoidea
- Family: Erebidae
- Subfamily: Arctiinae
- Genus: Pryteria
- Species: P. semicostalis

Binomial name
- Pryteria semicostalis (Rothschild, 1909)

Synonyms
- Automolis semicostalis Rothschild, 1909

Species of moth

Pryteria semicostalis is a moth in the family Erebidae. It was described by Walter Rothschild in 1909. It is found in French Guiana, Suriname, Brazil, Ecuador and Bolivia.
