= Cliniodes malleri =

Scientific classification
- Domain: Eukaryota
- Kingdom: Animalia
- Phylum: Arthropoda
- Class: Insecta
- Order: Lepidoptera
- Family: Crambidae
- Genus: Cliniodes
- Species: C. malleri

Binomial name
- Cliniodes malleri Munroe, 1964

Species of moth

Cliniodes malleri is a moth in the family Crambidae. It was described by Eugene G. Munroe in 1964. It is found in southern Brazil.

Adults have been recorded on wing year round, except February and July.
