= Prenesta anaemicalis =

Scientific classification
- Kingdom: Animalia
- Phylum: Arthropoda
- Class: Insecta
- Order: Lepidoptera
- Family: Crambidae
- Genus: Prenesta
- Species: P. anaemicalis

Binomial name
- Prenesta anaemicalis (Hampson, 1912)

Synonyms
- Syngamia anaemicalis Hampson, 1912

Species of moth

Prenesta anaemicalis is a moth in the family Crambidae. It was described by George Hampson in 1912. It is found in Paraguay.
