= Pryteria apicata =

Scientific classification
- Domain: Eukaryota
- Kingdom: Animalia
- Phylum: Arthropoda
- Class: Insecta
- Order: Lepidoptera
- Superfamily: Noctuoidea
- Family: Erebidae
- Subfamily: Arctiinae
- Genus: Pryteria
- Species: P. apicata

Binomial name
- Pryteria apicata (Schaus, 1905)

Synonyms
- Automolis apicata Schaus, 1905

Species of moth

Pryteria apicata is a moth in the family Erebidae. It was described by William Schaus in 1905. It is found in French Guiana.
