= Cliniodes iopolia =

Scientific classification
- Domain: Eukaryota
- Kingdom: Animalia
- Phylum: Arthropoda
- Class: Insecta
- Order: Lepidoptera
- Family: Crambidae
- Genus: Cliniodes
- Species: C. iopolia

Binomial name
- Cliniodes iopolia Hayden, 2011

Species of moth

Cliniodes iopolia is a moth in the family Crambidae. It was described by James E. Hayden in 2011. It is found in Peru, Ecuador and Colombia. Adults have been recorded on wing in January, September and November.
