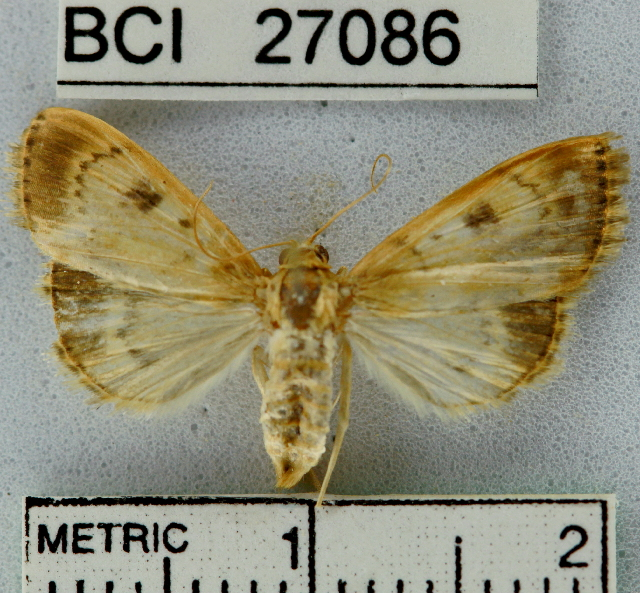

Scientific classification
- Kingdom: Animalia
- Phylum: Arthropoda
- Class: Insecta
- Order: Lepidoptera
- Family: Crambidae
- Genus: Phaedropsis
- Species: P. leialis

Binomial name
- Phaedropsis leialis (Dognin, 1906)

Synonyms
- Lygropia leialis Dognin, 1906; Goniorhynchus lasyguialis Hampson, 1912

= Phaedropsis leialis =

Species of moth

Phaedropsis leialis is a species of moth in the family Crambidae. It was described by Paul Dognin in 1906. It is found in Paraguay, El Salvador, Panama, Costa Rica and Belize.
