= Cliniodes superbalis =

Scientific classification
- Domain: Eukaryota
- Kingdom: Animalia
- Phylum: Arthropoda
- Class: Insecta
- Order: Lepidoptera
- Family: Crambidae
- Genus: Cliniodes
- Species: C. superbalis

Binomial name
- Cliniodes superbalis Dognin, 1911

Species of moth

Cliniodes superbalis is a moth in the family Crambidae. It was described by Paul Dognin in 1911. It is found in the eastern Andes, from Bolivia to Colombia. It is possibly also present in Venezuela.

The length of the forewings is 13–19 mm for males and 15–19 mm for females. Adults have been recorded on wing year round.
