= Heinrich Benno Möschler =

German entomologist

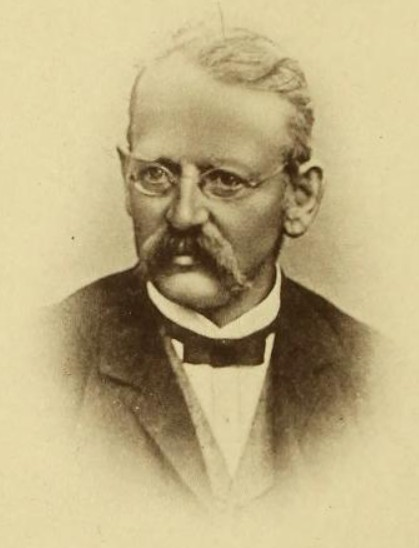
Heinrich Benno Möschler

Heinrich Benno Möschler (28 October 1831, in Herrnhut – 21 November 1888, in Kronförstchen, near Bautzen) was a German entomologist who specialised in Lepidoptera.

Möschler was a butterfly dealer and a member of the Entomological Society of Stettin. His collections from Suriname and Puerto Rico are in the Natural History Museum, Berlin. His microlepidoptera are in the Museum of Natural History, Görlitz.

== Publications ==
Partial list

- (1876). Exotisches (Fortsetzung). Stettiner Entomologische Zeitung 37(7–9), 293–315.
- (1877). Beiträge zur Schmetterlings-Fauna von Surinam. Verh. zool.-bot. Ges. Wien 26: 293–352 Möschler, 1877: Beiträge zur Schmetterlings-Fauna von Surinam Verh. zool.-bot. Ges. Wien 26: 293–352
- (1878). Beiträge zur Schmetterlings-Fauna von Surinam. II. Verhandlungen der kaiserlich-königlichen zoologisch-botanischen Gesellschaft in Wien 27, 629–700.
- (1880/1881a). Beiträge zur Schmetterlings-Fauna von Surinam III.
- (1882). Beiträge zur Schmetterlings-Fauna von Surinam. IV
- (1884). Beiträge zur Schmetterlings-fauna des Kaffernlandes. Verhandlungen der kk Zoologisch-Botanischen Gesellschaft in Wien, 33:267–310, pl.l
- (1887). Beiträge zur Schmetterlings-Fauna der Goldküste.
- (1890). Die Lepidopteren-Fauna der Insel Portorico. Abhandlungen der Senkenbergischen Naturforschenden Gesellschaft, 16 : 70–360, pl.1
