= Stenoma frondifer =

Scientific classification
- Kingdom: Animalia
- Phylum: Arthropoda
- Class: Insecta
- Order: Lepidoptera
- Family: Depressariidae
- Genus: Stenoma
- Species: S. frondifer

Binomial name
- Stenoma frondifer Busck, 1914

Species of moth

Stenoma frondifer is a moth in the family Depressariidae. It was described by August Busck in 1914. It is found in Panama.

The wingspan is about 18 mm. The forewings are dark brownish fuscous with a greenish tint and strongly mottled with transverse, black striations. At the end of the cell lies a large oblong leafgreen spot which is connected by a narrow neck with another similar, but perpendicular, oval spot at the tornus. Below the first of these spots is a small, pure, white dot as in Antaeotricha virens. The hindwings are light fuscous and unicolored.
