= Antaeotricha virens =

Scientific classification
- Kingdom: Animalia
- Phylum: Arthropoda
- Class: Insecta
- Order: Lepidoptera
- Family: Depressariidae
- Genus: Antaeotricha
- Species: A. virens

Binomial name
- Antaeotricha virens (Meyrick, 1912)

Synonyms
- Prasolithites virens Meyrick, 1912; Stenoma viridis Busck, 1914

Species of moth

Antaeotricha virens is a moth in the family Depressariidae. It was described by Edward Meyrick in 1912. It is found in Colombia and Panama.

The wingspan is about 32 mm. The forewings are greenish-fuscous with the costal edge fulvous-brown, edged beneath with violet suffusion from the base to beyond the middle and with a small violet-white oblique mark beneath the costa at two-fifths and a large dull green patch occupying nearly the apical half of the wing, its anterior edge running from about the middle of the costa to two-thirds of the dorsum, but with its upper three-fifths forming a broad triangular projection which extends inwards to above the fold at one-fourth, the ground colour beneath this projection somewhat prominent outwardly and including a small indistinct group of whitish scales. The hindwings are whitish-ochreous, the basal three-fifths tinged with light fuscous.
