= Stenoma nebrita =

Scientific classification
- Domain: Eukaryota
- Kingdom: Animalia
- Phylum: Arthropoda
- Class: Insecta
- Order: Lepidoptera
- Family: Depressariidae
- Genus: Stenoma
- Species: S. nebrita

Binomial name
- Stenoma nebrita Walsingham, 1913

Synonyms
- Stenoma lithoxesta Meyrick, 1915

Species of moth

Stenoma nebrita is a moth of the family Depressariidae. It is found in Panama, Costa Rica and Guyana.

The wingspan is about 22 mm for males and 26 mm for females. The forewings are rather dark ashy grey, the base narrowly purple, with suffused orange spots above and below the middle, the purple extended on the dorsum to one-fifth. A rounded whitish-yellowish spot becoming yellow ochreous posteriorly and wholly surrounded with dark fuscous rests on the costa towards the base, and a larger oval pale purplish spot suffused with ferruginous posteriorly and also wholly surrounded with dark fuscous except beneath immediately beyond it, extending to the middle of the costa. There is an undefined elongate patch of light purplish suffusion extending in the disc from beneath these to beyond the cell, including a dark ferruginous-fuscous spot on the fold before the middle, and a transverse mark on the end of the cell. A small pale yellowish spot surrounded with dark fuscous above is found on the middle of the dorsum and there is an elongate dark fuscous spot on the dorsum about three-fourths, and a suffused orange mark above it. There are also two irregular dentate dark fuscous lines from the costa posteriorly to about the tornus, the costa whitish between these. A slender dark fuscous streak is found around the apex and termen, including an orange marginal mark at the apex. The hindwings are dark grey.
