= Stenoma recondita =

Scientific classification
- Domain: Eukaryota
- Kingdom: Animalia
- Phylum: Arthropoda
- Class: Insecta
- Order: Lepidoptera
- Family: Depressariidae
- Genus: Stenoma
- Species: S. recondita

Binomial name
- Stenoma recondita Meyrick, 1915

Species of moth

Stenoma recondita is a species of moth of the family Depressariidae. It is found in Guyana.

The wingspan is 14–17 mm. The forewings are light purplish grey, paler and whitish tinged towards the costa, the costal edge white. There is a black elongate mark on the costa beyond two-fifths, edged beneath by a pale ochreous-yellowish dot and a bisinuate erect dark fuscous line from the dorsum at two-fifths reaching three-fourths across the wing, the sinuations edged posteriorly with pale ochreous yellowish. There is an irregularly triangular dark fuscous blotch on the costa beyond the middle, becoming blackish on the costa, the apex edged with pale ochreous yellowish. A transverse dark fuscous mark is found on the end of the cell and an indistinct irregular dark fuscous line runs from the apex of the costal blotch to behind this mark, then irregularly sinuate to four-fifths of the dorsum, partially edged with whitish-yellowish. There is a triangular blackish spot on the costa at four-fifths, where a rather curved indistinct slender interrupted dark fuscous line or series of marks runs to the tornus, edged anteriorly with yellow whitish. There is an elongate-triangular blackish spot reaching from this line, to the costa before the apex, surrounded by some pale ochreous suffusion and there is a fine dark fuscous terminal line, edged anteriorly with whitish. The hindwings are light grey.
