= Stenoma ferrocanella =

Scientific classification
- Kingdom: Animalia
- Phylum: Arthropoda
- Class: Insecta
- Order: Lepidoptera
- Family: Depressariidae
- Genus: Stenoma
- Species: S. ferrocanella

Binomial name
- Stenoma ferrocanella (Walker, 1864)

Synonyms
- Cryptolechia ferrocanella Walker, 1864; Cryptolechia marcida Butler, 1877; Stenoma ferricanella

Species of moth

Stenoma ferrocanella is a moth in the family Depressariidae. It was described by Francis Walker in 1864. It is found in Panama and Brazil (Amazonas).

The wingspan is about 25 mm. The forewings are pale rosy grey at the base, on the middle of the costa, and along the termen and apex, with a wash of reddish fawn between the grey patches, becoming tawny vinous along the edges of the fawn spaces. This colour appears conspicuously at the costal extremity of the first fawn patch, also along its inwardly oblique sinuate inner edge, which, leaving the costa at one-third, runs to the dorsum near the base. A tawny vinous spot lies in the fold, a little beyond its middle, and, above and beyond this, a large reniform fawn patch, partially isolated by lines of rosy grey, lies at the end of the cell, its narrow vinous margin produced downward to the dorsum before the tornus, thus bounding a second large fawn patch rising from the tornus to the outer third of the costa, its outer edge throwing out short dentate projections between the veins. A marginal row of small vinous spots bounds the outer side of the elongate rosy grey terminal patch. The hindwings are yellowish, with the costa whitish.
