= Stenoma platyterma =

Scientific classification
- Domain: Eukaryota
- Kingdom: Animalia
- Phylum: Arthropoda
- Class: Insecta
- Order: Lepidoptera
- Family: Depressariidae
- Genus: Stenoma
- Species: S. platyterma

Binomial name
- Stenoma platyterma Meyrick, 1915

Species of moth

Stenoma platyterma is a moth of the family Depressariidae. It is found in Guyana.

The wingspan is about 18 mm. The forewings are light brownish, slightly sprinkled with darker, towards the costa anteriorly becoming pale brownish ochreous and with a triangular dark fuscous spot on the base of the costa, as well as a suffused elongate dark fuscous spot along the basal third of the dorsum, the dorsal scale-projection mixed with white. There is an indistinct irregular waved dark fuscous line from a small spot on one-fifth of the costa to two-thirds of the dorsum and a dark fuscous streak along the costa from two-fifths to three-fourths, each extremity marked with blackish and suffused with dark brown, from the anterior extremity an oblique dentate dark brown line runs half across the wing. A broad pale ochreous-yellowish band occupies the terminal fourth of the wing, its anterior edge rather concave in the middle and convex on the lower half, marked with blackish towards the dorsum. Within this band is a faint submarginal fascia of yellower or grey-yellowish suffusion and there is an elongate blackish marginal mark above the apex, two dots above this, and an indistinctly interrupted terminal line from beneath to near the tornus. The hindwings are grey with the apex suffused with whitish and marked with dark fuscous on the margin.
