= Stenoma comma =

Scientific classification
- Domain: Eukaryota
- Kingdom: Animalia
- Phylum: Arthropoda
- Class: Insecta
- Order: Lepidoptera
- Family: Depressariidae
- Genus: Stenoma
- Species: S. comma

Binomial name
- Stenoma comma Busck, 1911

Synonyms
- Stenoma melanocrypta Meyrick, 1915

Species of moth

Stenoma comma is a moth of the family Depressariidae. It is found in Cuba, Mexico, El Salvador, Costa Rica, Panama, Venezuela, French Guiana and Guyana.

The wingspan is about 14 mm. The forewings are pale whitish ochreous, pinkish tinged, with irregularly scattered ferruginous-brown scales and with the costa narrowly grey from the base to the middle and with a short dark reddish-brown mark from the base in the middle. There is an undefined cloudy ferruginous-fuscous line from one-third of the costa to beyond the middle of the dorsum and a cloudy fuscous spot on the fold beyond this representing the plical stigma. There is a transverse ferruginous-fuscous mark on the end of the cell. A triangular dark fuscous spot is found on the costa beyond the middle, where an undefined interrupted irregularly curved ferruginous-fuscous line runs to four-fifths of the dorsum. There is a suffused triangular dark fuscous spot on the costa at three-fourths, where a curved ferruginous-fuscous line runs to the tornus and there is a greyish marginal line dotted with dark fuscous around the apex and termen. The hindwings are whitish with an elongate-oval subdorsal patch of dense black hairscales.
