= Stenoma hopfferi =

Scientific classification
- Kingdom: Animalia
- Phylum: Arthropoda
- Clade: Pancrustacea
- Class: Insecta
- Order: Lepidoptera
- Family: Depressariidae
- Genus: Stenoma
- Species: S. hopfferi

Binomial name
- Stenoma hopfferi (Zeller, 1854)

Synonyms
- Auxocrossa hopfferi Zeller, 1854; Stenoma phyllocosma Meyrick, 1916

Species of moth

Stenoma hopfferi is a moth of the family Depressariidae. It is found in Brazil (Pará) and the Guianas.

The wingspan is 20–21 mm. The forewings are ochreous whitish, faintly pinkish tinged with the costal area pale glossy grey and the costal edge white. The discal area is irregularly suffused with light greenish and a very small brown spot on the base of the costa, as well as three subtriangular brown costal spots edged with whitish, their costal edge blackish, the first at one-fourth is small, the others moderate, the second median, the third at four-fifths, its costal edge bisected and followed by a third similar segment. There is a brown subbasal dot in the middle and some brownish suffusion towards the dorsum at one-fourth, as well as a grey dot on the end of the cell. There is a curved dark fuscous line from the third costal spot to the dorsum before the tornus, limiting the green area, expanded into a blackish tornal blotch. The terminal edge is suffused with brownish and spotted with dark fuscous, expanded above into a triangular brown blotch extending from near the apex to below the middle, the terminal area otherwise grey whitish. The hindwings are grey.
