= Stenoma chloroloba =

Scientific classification
- Domain: Eukaryota
- Kingdom: Animalia
- Phylum: Arthropoda
- Class: Insecta
- Order: Lepidoptera
- Family: Depressariidae
- Genus: Stenoma
- Species: S. chloroloba

Binomial name
- Stenoma chloroloba Meyrick, 1915

Species of moth

Stenoma chloroloba is a moth of the family Depressariidae. It is found in Peru, French Guiana, Guyana and Brazil.

The wingspan is about 18 mm. The forewings are pale ochreous suffused with white and sprinkled with fuscous and with the base irrorated with fuscous. There are three brown lines dilated and dark fuscous on the costa, edged anteriorly with white, the first at one-third, straight and direct, the second beyond the middle, rather oblique, angulated outwards in the middle, the third from three-fourths of the costa to the tornus, slightly curved, sinuate inwards above the middle. There is a rather dark fuscous dot beneath the middle of the disc, and one within the angulation of the second line. A cloudy dark grey line, marked with undefined darker dots is found along the termen. The hindwings are pale grey, suffused with ochreous whitish anteriorly. The costa broadly expanded from the base to two-thirds, the margin rough scaled, vein 8 depressed and approximated to the cell, the broad costal area whitish yellowish, towards the margin white, with a dark yellowish-grey glandular mark above 8 towards the base.
