= Stenoma lucidiorella =

Scientific classification
- Kingdom: Animalia
- Phylum: Arthropoda
- Class: Insecta
- Order: Lepidoptera
- Family: Depressariidae
- Genus: Stenoma
- Species: S. lucidiorella

Binomial name
- Stenoma lucidiorella (Walker, 1864)

Synonyms
- Cryptolechia lucidiorella Walker, 1864; Cryptolechia cretifera Felder & Rogenhofer, 1875; Cryptolechia javarica Butler, 1877; Stenoma paramochla Meyrick, 1918

Species of moth

Stenoma lucidiorella is a moth in the family Depressariidae. It was described by Francis Walker in 1864. It is found in Colombia, Brazil (Pará, Amazonas) and French Guiana.

The wingspan is about 19 mm. The forewings are snow white with the markings brownish grey and the costal edge dark grey towards the base. A fascia at one-fifth is narrowly interrupted to form three spots, the uppermost not quite reaching the costa and there is a very irregular transverse streak at one-third, as well as a small spot representing the second discal stigma. An irregular fasciate streak is found from the costa at three-fifths reaching half across the wing to just beyond this, touching it and there is also a streak from the costa at four-fifths reaching one-third across the wing. A marginal series of fuscous marks is found around the apex and termen. The hindwings are whitish, posteriorly suffused pale grey.
