= Stenoma convexicostata =

Scientific classification
- Kingdom: Animalia
- Phylum: Arthropoda
- Clade: Pancrustacea
- Class: Insecta
- Order: Lepidoptera
- Family: Depressariidae
- Genus: Stenoma
- Species: S. convexicostata

Binomial name
- Stenoma convexicostata (Zeller, 1877)

Synonyms
- Cryptolechia convexicostata Zeller, 1877; Stenoma liniella Busck, 1910; Stenoma cantatrix Meyrick, 1925

Species of moth

Stenoma convexicostata is a moth of the family Depressariidae. It is found in Brazil (Rio de Janeiro), Bolivia and Costa Rica.

The wingspan is about 31 mm. The forewings are whitish fuscous closely speckled fuscous, the anterior half of the costa rather suffused fuscous and three nearly parallel oblique transverse dark fuscous lines, the first before the middle, not reaching the margins, the second beyond the middle, becoming more oblique dorsally and ending in the tornus, between the first and second a parallel fascia of fuscous suffusion not reaching the dorsum, the third slightly excurved and meeting the second on the tornus. There is a dark fuscous dorsal line from one-fifth to three-fourths. There is a suffused dark fuscous line around the posterior part of the costa and termen. The hindwings are rather dark grey.
