= Stenoma salome =

Scientific classification
- Domain: Eukaryota
- Kingdom: Animalia
- Phylum: Arthropoda
- Class: Insecta
- Order: Lepidoptera
- Family: Depressariidae
- Genus: Stenoma
- Species: S. salome

Binomial name
- Stenoma salome Busck, 1911

Synonyms
- Stenoma clavifera Meyrick, 1912

Species of moth

Stenoma salome is a moth of the family Depressariidae. It is found in Brazil in the states of Paraná and São Paulo.

The wingspan is about 23 mm. The forewings are pale whitish fuscous with the markings ferruginous brown and the costal edge ferruginous brownish. There is a transverse line from one-fifth of the costa to one-fifth of the dorsum, strongly angulated outwards above the middle, with a posterior projection in the middle, produced as a faint line through the disc. The plical stigma is blackish and there is a slightly curved line from the middle of the costa to three-fourths of the dorsum, dilated at the extremities, and in the middle expanded posteriorly into a triangular spot containing a spot of ground colour. The ground colour between this and the following line is tinged with ferruginous brownish and there is a triangular spot on the costa at three-fourths, where a fine indistinct curved line runs to the dorsum before the tornus. There is also a series of dots around the apex and termen. The hindwings are ochreous whitish.
