= Stenoma promotella =

Scientific classification
- Kingdom: Animalia
- Phylum: Arthropoda
- Clade: Pancrustacea
- Class: Insecta
- Order: Lepidoptera
- Family: Depressariidae
- Genus: Stenoma
- Species: S. promotella

Binomial name
- Stenoma promotella (Zeller, 1877)

Synonyms
- Cryptolechia promotella Zeller, 1877; Stenoma associata Meyrick, 1925

Species of moth

Stenoma promotella is a moth of the family Depressariidae. It is found in Panama, Brazil (Pará) and Peru.

The wingspan is 16–17 mm. The forewings are ochreous-grey whitish with the second discal stigma dark fuscous. There is sometimes some fuscous irroration towards the base of the costa and dorsum and there is an oblique blackish-grey mark on the costa at one-third, where a faint interrupted brownish shade runs to some suffusion on the dorsum about the middle. There is a triangular blackish-grey spot on the middle of the costa, where a similar faint shade runs to some dorsal suffusion at three-fourths. A larger triangular blackish-grey spot is found on the costa about three-fourths, where a curved brownish line runs to the tornus. There are some black marginal dots around the apex and termen, the largest at and above the apex, on the termen connected by a fuscous line. The hindwings are light greyish.
