= Stenoma consociella =

Scientific classification
- Kingdom: Animalia
- Phylum: Arthropoda
- Class: Insecta
- Order: Lepidoptera
- Family: Depressariidae
- Genus: Stenoma
- Species: S. consociella

Binomial name
- Stenoma consociella (Walker, 1864)

Synonyms
- Cryptolechia consociella Walker, 1864; Stenoma petrina Walsingham, 1912

Species of moth

Stenoma consociella is a moth in the family Depressariidae. It was described by Francis Walker in 1864. It is found in Suriname, Guatemala, Panama and Brazil (Amazonas).

The wingspan is about 20–21 mm. The forewings are stone whitish, with a very pale fawn-brownish suffused shade. A fuscous shade on the cell at one-fourth, with a smaller one on the fold, below and a little beyond it, is succeeded by another at the end of the cell, beyond which is a curved series of very indistinct fawn-brownish shade streaks at the base of the diverging veins. Beyond these is a series of dots of the same colour, commencing with three from the costa, forming an angle below it a little darker than the remainder, which, curving outward opposite to the middle of the termen, revert to the dorsum before the tornus. A further series of brownish-fuscous dots, two costal and seven terminal, extends around the margin. The hindwings are whitish grey.
