= Stenoma bicensa =

Scientific classification
- Domain: Eukaryota
- Kingdom: Animalia
- Phylum: Arthropoda
- Class: Insecta
- Order: Lepidoptera
- Family: Depressariidae
- Genus: Stenoma
- Species: S. bicensa

Binomial name
- Stenoma bicensa Meyrick, 1915

Species of moth

Stenoma bicensa is a moth of the family Depressariidae. It is found in Brazil (São Paulo) and Panama.

The wingspan is about 24 mm. The forewings are white brownish with the costal edge whitish and with a small indistinct fuscous spot on the costa at one-fourth, giving rise to a short fine oblique irregular striga. The discal stigmata are small, dark fuscous and indistinct and there is an undefined patch of ferruginous-brownish irroration on the middle of the dorsum. There are moderate rounded dark fuscous spots on the costa at the middle and four-fifths, a strongly curved series of undefined longitudinal marks of brownish and dark fuscous irroration running from the first of these to three-fourths of the dorsum, and a curved series of dark fuscous dots from the second to the dorsum before the tornus. There is also a marginal series of dark fuscous dots around the apex and termen. The hindwings ochreous whitish, faintly tinged with greyish towards the dorsum and with yellowish towards the apex.
