= Stenoma vaga =

Scientific classification
- Domain: Eukaryota
- Kingdom: Animalia
- Phylum: Arthropoda
- Class: Insecta
- Order: Lepidoptera
- Family: Depressariidae
- Genus: Stenoma
- Species: S. vaga

Binomial name
- Stenoma vaga (Butler, 1877)

Synonyms
- Cryptolechia vaga Butler, 1877; Stenoma licmaea Meyrick, 1915

Species of moth

Stenoma vaga is a moth of the family Depressariidae. It is found in the Amazon region.

The wingspan is 22–23 mm. The forewings are whitish ochreous, tinged with brownish and with a blackish dot near the base in the middle, and one beneath the costa at one-fifth. The stigmata are dark fuscous, with the plical obliquely beyond the first discal. There are cloudy dark fuscous dots on the upper margin of the cell before and beyond the first discal stigma. Two series of cloudy brownish dots are sprinkled with dark fuscous, the first from the middle of the costa to the middle of the dorsum, very strongly sinuate curved outwards around the cell, the second from before four-fifths of the costa to five-sixths of the dorsum, strongly curved outwards in the disc. There is also a marginal series of blackish dots around the posterior part of the costa and termen. The hindwings are whitish.
