= Stenoma stabilis =

Scientific classification
- Kingdom: Animalia
- Phylum: Arthropoda
- Clade: Pancrustacea
- Class: Insecta
- Order: Lepidoptera
- Family: Depressariidae
- Genus: Stenoma
- Species: S. stabilis

Binomial name
- Stenoma stabilis (Butler, 1877)

Synonyms
- Cryptolechia stabilis Butler, 1877; Stenoma chionodora Meyrick, 1915; Gonioterma rita Busck, 1920

Species of moth

Stenoma stabilis is a moth of the family Depressariidae. It is found in French Guiana, Guyana and Brazil (Amazonas).

The wingspan is 25–27 mm. The forewings are light brownish with the extreme costal edge whitish ochreous and with a small dark purple-fuscous spot on the costa before one-fourth, giving rise to a short oblique zigzag fuscous line. The plical and second discal stigmata are small, dark fuscous and obscure. There is a large triangular dark purple-fuscous spot on the middle of the costa, and a smaller one at three-fourths, where a curved series of sometimes indistinct dark fuscous dots runs to the dorsum before the tornus. There is also a marginal series of dark fuscous dots around the apex and termen. The hindwings are grey whitish, somewhat greyer posteriorly.
