= Stenoma completella =

Scientific classification
- Kingdom: Animalia
- Phylum: Arthropoda
- Class: Insecta
- Order: Lepidoptera
- Family: Depressariidae
- Genus: Stenoma
- Species: S. completella

Binomial name
- Stenoma completella (Walker, 1864)

Synonyms
- Cryptolechia completella Walker, 1864; Timocratica completella

Species of moth

Stenoma completella is a moth of the family Depressariidae. It is found in Brazil (Amazonas), Colombia, Panama and Costa Rica.

Adults are cinereous-fawn colour with broad wings, the forewings somewhat rounded at the tips, with seven oblique darker fawn-coloured lines. The first and second more longitudinal than the others, near the interior border, on which they terminate. The third, fourth and fifth are short and the sixth and seventh extending nearly to the interior angle. There are eight dark fawn-coloured longitudinal streaks between the seventh line and the submarginal line, which is cinereous and is denticulated on its inner side, and is retracted towards the costa as far as the seventh line. The marginal line is cinereous, bordered with dark fawn colour on its outer side and the exterior border is straight and not oblique. The hindwings are cinereous.

The larvae feed on Brosimum costaricanum. They skeletonize leaves tied together with silk.
