= Stenoma peccans =

Scientific classification
- Domain: Eukaryota
- Kingdom: Animalia
- Phylum: Arthropoda
- Class: Insecta
- Order: Lepidoptera
- Family: Depressariidae
- Genus: Stenoma
- Species: S. peccans

Binomial name
- Stenoma peccans (Butler, 1877)

Synonyms
- Cryptolechia peccans Butler, 1877; Stenoma binodis Meyrick, 1915

Species of moth

Stenoma peccans is a moth of the family Depressariidae. It is found in the Amazon region and French Guiana.

The wingspan is about 21 mm. The forewings are brownish violet with the extreme costal edge ochreous-whitish and with a straight blackish-fuscous line from one-fourth of the costa to beyond the middle of the dorsum, irregularly enlarged towards the costa, and with attached spots on the posterior edge above and below the middle, representing the stigmata. A large triangular blackish-fuscous spot is found on the middle of the costa, and a somewhat smaller one about four-fifths. There are two small dark fuscous dots transversely placed on the end of the cell and there is a terminal series of indistinct dark fuscous dots. The hindwings are dark grey strewn with blackish hairscales, the apex and upper part of the termen slenderly suffused with pale rosy.
