= Stenoma alluvialis =

Scientific classification
- Domain: Eukaryota
- Kingdom: Animalia
- Phylum: Arthropoda
- Class: Insecta
- Order: Lepidoptera
- Family: Depressariidae
- Genus: Stenoma
- Species: S. alluvialis

Binomial name
- Stenoma alluvialis Meyrick, 1925

Species of moth

Stenoma alluvialis is a moth of the family Depressariidae. It is found in Peru and French Guiana.

The wingspan is 24–25 mm. The forewings are lilac whitish, the costal edge white and the dorsal area beneath the fold tinged lilac brownish, with scattered dark fuscous scales, a few lilac-brown scales scattered in the disc about the stigmata. There is a fine line of dark fuscous scales along the dorsal edge from about one-fourth to the tornus. The stigmata are dark fuscous, the plical very obliquely beyond the first discal, the second discal transverse-linear. There are cloudy grey subtriangular spots on the costa about the middle and four-fifths, from the second a curved series of cloudy fuscous dots to the tornus, between veins three and nine a curved series of rather larger similar dots midway between this and the end of the cell. There is a marginal series of blackish dots around the apex and termen. The hindwings are pale whitish yellowish.
