= Stenoma diametrica =

Scientific classification
- Domain: Eukaryota
- Kingdom: Animalia
- Phylum: Arthropoda
- Class: Insecta
- Order: Lepidoptera
- Family: Depressariidae
- Genus: Stenoma
- Species: S. diametrica

Binomial name
- Stenoma diametrica Meyrick, 1926

Species of moth

Stenoma diametrica is a moth of the family Depressariidae. It is found in Colombia.

The wingspan is about 18 mm. The forewings are violet white, with a few scattered brown scales and a brown spot beneath the base of the costa and a light violet-grey band sprinkled brownish extending along the dorsum from the base to four-fifths, including a brown trapezoidal blotch resting on the dorsum before the middle, becoming blackish towards the dorsum, widened upwards and the discal edge twice dorsal. The first discal stigma forms a dark brown dash and the wing beyond a line from the middle of the costa to the tornus is chestnut brown, enclosing a costal blotch of light ochreous suffusion, and some white suffusion at the apex, a white dot in the middle of the edge of this patch representing the second disoal stigma. The hindwings are oohreous white with a grey fascia on the upper three-fourths of the termen, moderately broad at the apex and diminishing to a point downwards.
