= Stenoma scoliandra =

Scientific classification
- Domain: Eukaryota
- Kingdom: Animalia
- Phylum: Arthropoda
- Class: Insecta
- Order: Lepidoptera
- Family: Depressariidae
- Genus: Stenoma
- Species: S. scoliandra

Binomial name
- Stenoma scoliandra Meyrick, 1915

Species of moth

Stenoma scoliandra is a moth of the family Depressariidae. It is found in Brazil, French Guiana and Guyana.

The wingspan is about 15 mm. The forewings are rather dark fuscous with a dense expansible tuft or brush of very long spatulate fuscous scales beneath the costa from the base to the middle, partially covered by a spreading fringe of dense brownish scales from the costa, the costal edge above this ferruginous, and roughened with fuscous scales towards the base. The plical and second discal stigmata are blackish and there is a cloudy blackish streak running from beneath the middle of the costa around the posterior margin of the cell, then indistinctly continued to the tornus. A curved series of indistinct cloudy blackish dots is found from the costa beyond the middle to the tornus and there are four small blackish spots on the costa posteriorly, separated by whitish ochreous. There are six cloudy blackish marginal dots around the termen. The hindwings are blackish.
