= Stenoma sequestra =

Scientific classification
- Kingdom: Animalia
- Phylum: Arthropoda
- Class: Insecta
- Order: Lepidoptera
- Family: Depressariidae
- Genus: Stenoma
- Species: S. sequestra

Binomial name
- Stenoma sequestra Meyrick, 1918

Species of moth

Stenoma sequestra is a moth in the family Depressariidae. It was described by Edward Meyrick in 1918. It is found in the Guianas and Brazil.

The wingspan is about 22 mm. The forewings are whitish grey, very faintly violet tinged and with the costal edge white. There is a large basal patch of dark brownish irroration, the edge running from beyond one-fourth of the costa to three-fifths of the dorsum, somewhat convex. An oblique dark fuscous mark is found on the costa at one-fourth and the second discal stigma forms a dark fuscous transverse mark. There is a blackish elongate mark on the costa beyond the middle, where an oblique irregular brownish line runs to a brownish ring beyond the second discal stigma. There is also a flattened-triangular blackish spot on the costa at four-fifths, where a rather strongly curved brown-grey line runs to the dorsum before the tornus. There is a terminal series of black dots or marks. The hindwings are ochreous-grey whitish.
