= Stenoma eva =

Scientific classification
- Domain: Eukaryota
- Kingdom: Animalia
- Phylum: Arthropoda
- Class: Insecta
- Order: Lepidoptera
- Family: Depressariidae
- Genus: Stenoma
- Species: S. eva

Binomial name
- Stenoma eva Meyrick, 1915

Species of moth

Stenoma eva is a moth of the family Depressariidae. It is found in Guyana.

The wingspan is about 13 mm. The forewings are pale violet-whitish grey with the anterior half of the costa suffused with white and with a semi-oval blotch of dark purple-fuscous suffusion on the middle of the dorsum, reaching one-third across the wing, tinged with orange ferruginous above, and margined with white suffusion. There is an orange streak along the posterior half of the costa, widest posteriorly, edged beneath posteriorly by some dark fuscous-purple suffusion, cut by a very oblique violet-leaden line running from three-fifths of the costa to near the extremity of its lower margin, and marked on the costa by three or four short fine oblique dark fuscous strigulae. The tornal area is suffused with pale whitish yellowish and there is an indistinct short white dentate pre-marginal line before the termen. The hindwings are pale grey or whitish grey, more whitish anteriorly.
