= Stenoma collybista =

Scientific classification
- Domain: Eukaryota
- Kingdom: Animalia
- Phylum: Arthropoda
- Class: Insecta
- Order: Lepidoptera
- Family: Depressariidae
- Genus: Stenoma
- Species: S. collybista

Binomial name
- Stenoma collybista (Meyrick, 1915)

Synonyms
- Gonioterma collybista Meyrick, 1915

Species of moth

Stenoma collybista is a moth in the family Depressariidae. It was described by Edward Meyrick in 1915. It is found in Peru.

The wingspan is 21–22 mm. The forewings are whitish-grey ochreous, sometimes partially suffused with pale violet grey and with the costal edge yellow whitish, at the base dark fuscous. There is a small triangular dark fuscous spot on the costa beyond one-fourth (sometimes obsolete), and larger ones in the middle and beyond three-fourths. The stigmata are small, indistinct and dark grey, the plical obliquely beyond the first discal. There is some faint brownish suffusion towards the middle of the dorsum, as well as a rather strongly curved row of indistinct grey dots crossing the wing from the third costal spot. A brownish terminal line is marked with a series of dark fuscous dots. The hindwings are grey.
