= Stenoma meligrapta =

Scientific classification
- Domain: Eukaryota
- Kingdom: Animalia
- Phylum: Arthropoda
- Class: Insecta
- Order: Lepidoptera
- Family: Depressariidae
- Genus: Stenoma
- Species: S. meligrapta

Binomial name
- Stenoma meligrapta Meyrick, 1925

Species of moth

Stenoma meligrapta is a moth of the family Depressariidae. It is found in Pará, Brazil.

The wingspan is about 12 mm. The forewings are violet grey with an oblique irregular blackish mark from the base of the costa, edged with whitish-ochreous suffusion. There are two oblique irregular blackish shades, the first from the costa at one-fifth to the fold, edged with light ochreous suffusion, a slender light ochreous-yellowish costal streak from this to three-fourths. The second shade is rather curved from the middle of the costa to the dorsum at three-fourths, edged anteriorly by a suffused light yellow-ochreous streak interrupting it in the middle. There is also a very oblique blackish mark on the costa at four-fifths, preceding a narrow ochreous-yellowish terminal fascia attenuated to the tornus. Four or five minute groups of black scales are located on the terminal edge. The hindwings are dark grey.
