= Stenoma chloroplaca =

Scientific classification
- Domain: Eukaryota
- Kingdom: Animalia
- Phylum: Arthropoda
- Class: Insecta
- Order: Lepidoptera
- Family: Depressariidae
- Genus: Stenoma
- Species: S. chloroplaca

Binomial name
- Stenoma chloroplaca (Meyrick, 1915)

Synonyms
- Gonioterma chloroplaca Meyrick, 1915

Species of moth

Stenoma chloroplaca is a moth in the family Depressariidae. It was described by Edward Meyrick in 1915. It is found in Guyana.

The wingspan is about 19 mm. The forewings are very pale yellow ochreous with the dorsal three-fifths from the base to the end of the cell tinged with grey, on the dorsum suffused with darker grey. The plical and second discal are stigmata small and dark fuscous. There is a semioval dark fuscous spots on the costa in the middle and at four-fifths, as well as a curved line of faint greyish dots from the second to the tornus, the terminal area beyond this faintly greyish. There is also a terminal series of dark fuscous dots, the apical one larger. The hindwings are light grey with the apical two-fifths pale ochreous yellowish except a suffused pale grey spot before the apex.
