= Stenoma emphatica =

Scientific classification
- Kingdom: Animalia
- Phylum: Arthropoda
- Clade: Pancrustacea
- Class: Insecta
- Order: Lepidoptera
- Family: Depressariidae
- Genus: Stenoma
- Species: S. emphatica

Binomial name
- Stenoma emphatica Meyrick, 1916

Species of moth

Stenoma emphatica is a moth of the family Depressariidae. It is found in French Guiana.

The wingspan is 22–23 mm. The forewings are pale brownish or whitish brownish, slightly sprinkled with darker or blackish specks, towards the costa suffused with dark brown. There are two fine indistinct lines of fuscous or dark fuscous irroration, the first from before one-third of the costa to two-fifths of the dorsum, slightly irregular, the second from three-fifths of the costa to four-fifths of the dorsum, unevenly curved outwards opposite the cell. The plical stigma is minute and black, the second discal represented by two transversely placed minute black dots. There is a straight white subterminal line, edged anteriorly by a small black spot near the costa and a black dot beneath this, the terminal area beyond this line suffused with whitish except on the margin. There is also a terminal series of small blackish dots. The hindwings are rather dark grey.
