= Stenoma ambiens =

Scientific classification
- Kingdom: Animalia
- Phylum: Arthropoda
- Class: Insecta
- Order: Lepidoptera
- Family: Depressariidae
- Genus: Stenoma
- Species: S. ambiens

Binomial name
- Stenoma ambiens Meyrick, 1922

Species of moth

Stenoma ambiens is a moth in the family Depressariidae. It was described by Edward Meyrick in 1922. It is found in French Guiana.

The wingspan is 23–26 mm. The forewings are grey whitish, with scattered grey and dark fuscous specks, the costal edge white except near the base and the stigmata small and dark fuscous, the plical very obliquely beyond first the discal, the second discal forming a small transverse mark. There is a small fuscous spot on the middle of the costa, where a strongly excurved shade of dark fuscous irroration runs to the dorsum at three-fourths, somewhat indented beneath the second discal. A triangular spot of fuscous suffusion is found on the costa towards the apex, the anterior edge darker, direct, from which a curved subterminal series of dark fuscous dots runs to the termen before the tornus. There is also a marginal series of black dots around the apex and termen. The hindwings are pale whitish yellow, with the extreme apex greyish.
