= Stenoma oxyscia =

Scientific classification
- Kingdom: Animalia
- Phylum: Arthropoda
- Class: Insecta
- Order: Lepidoptera
- Family: Depressariidae
- Genus: Stenoma
- Species: S. oxyscia

Binomial name
- Stenoma oxyscia Meyrick, 1922

Species of moth

Stenoma oxyscia is a moth in the family Depressariidae. It was described by Edward Meyrick in 1922. It is found in French Guiana.

The wingspan is about 21 mm. The forewings are whitish-grey ochreous with a blackish dot towards the costa at one-seventh, and a minute one on the fold near the base. The plical and second discal stigmata are blackish and there is a faint series of cloudy dots of fuscous irroration from beneath the middle of the costa very obliquely outwards, very acutely angulated between the second discal and apex, then passing close beneath the second discal to the fold. A subterminal series of cloudy dark fuscous dots is found from beneath the costa at two-thirds insinuate obliquely outwards, on the discal area strongly excurved to near the termen, then insinuate to near four-fifths of the dorsum. There is also a marginal series of dark fuscous dots around the posterior part of the costa and termen. The hindwings are rather dark grey.
