= Stenoma ferculata =

Scientific classification
- Kingdom: Animalia
- Phylum: Arthropoda
- Class: Insecta
- Order: Lepidoptera
- Family: Depressariidae
- Genus: Stenoma
- Species: S. ferculata

Binomial name
- Stenoma ferculata Meyrick, 1922

Species of moth

Stenoma ferculata is a moth in the family Depressariidae. It was described by Edward Meyrick in 1922. It is found in French Guiana.

The wingspan is about 23 mm. The forewings are grey, somewhat mixed obscurely with whitish suffusion, and with a few darker scales. There is a dark grey mark on the costa before one-third, and some irregular marking in the disc beneath it. The plical stigma are dark grey, the second discal black with some white scales on the sides, beyond this a small irregular dark grey spot. There is also an elongate brown blotch mixed dark brown extending along the costa from before the middle to near the apex, widest above the second discal and narrowed to the extremities, on the costa forming five dark fuscous elongate marks preceded and separated by ochreous whitish. Around the apex and termen is a marginal rather dark fuscous fascia containing a narrower fascia of whitish suffusion more or less broken into spots. The hindwings are rather dark grey.
