= Stenoma tristrigata =

Scientific classification
- Kingdom: Animalia
- Phylum: Arthropoda
- Clade: Pancrustacea
- Class: Insecta
- Order: Lepidoptera
- Family: Depressariidae
- Genus: Stenoma
- Species: S. tristrigata

Binomial name
- Stenoma tristrigata (Zeller, 1854)

Synonyms
- Cryptolechia tristrigata Zeller, 1854; Stenoma aphanodesma Meyrick, 1915

Species of moth

Stenoma tristrigata is a moth of the family Depressariidae. It is found in Brazil and the Guianas.

The wingspan is about 34 mm. The forewings are yellow ochreous, somewhat deeper towards the dorsum anteriorly and with the dorsum slenderly brown. There are three very faint slender brownish transverse lines, the first from one-fourth of the costa to the middle of the dorsum, straight, the second from a faint small spot on the middle of the costa, hardly traceable, the third from two-thirds of the costa to the dorsum before the tornus, rather curved. There is a marginal series of indistinct fuscous dots around the apex and termen. The hindwings are light ochreous yellowish, the dorsal third suffused with pale greyish.
