= Stenoma dorcadopa =

Scientific classification
- Domain: Eukaryota
- Kingdom: Animalia
- Phylum: Arthropoda
- Class: Insecta
- Order: Lepidoptera
- Family: Depressariidae
- Genus: Stenoma
- Species: S. dorcadopa

Binomial name
- Stenoma dorcadopa Meyrick, 1916

Species of moth

Stenoma dorcadopa is a moth of the family Depressariidae. It is found in French Guiana.

The wingspan is 13–14 mm. The forewings are pale ochreous, with a faint violet tinge and a black subbasal dot in the middle. There is a large oval black spot beneath the middle of the disc, the dorsal area before, beneath, and beyond this suffused with grey. The discal stigmata are small and black and there is some violet-fuscous suffusion beneath the costal edge on the anterior half, and a very oblique curved series of indistinct fuscous dots running from the middle of the costa to the dorsum before the tornus, as well as a thick dark violet-fuscous shade from the middle of the costa near the costal and apical margin to below the middle of the termen. A marginal series of dark fuscous marks is found around the apex and termen. The hindwings are grey, thinly scaled in the disc.
