= Stenoma thespia =

Scientific classification
- Domain: Eukaryota
- Kingdom: Animalia
- Phylum: Arthropoda
- Class: Insecta
- Order: Lepidoptera
- Family: Depressariidae
- Genus: Stenoma
- Species: S. thespia

Binomial name
- Stenoma thespia Meyrick, 1915

Species of moth

Stenoma thespia is a moth of the family Depressariidae. It is found in French Guiana.

The wingspan is 27–28 mm. The forewings are pale violet fuscous, with a whitish gloss and with the costal edge ochreous whitish. The basal third of the wing is faintly and obscurely clouded with darker. There are two rather dark fuscous dots transversely placed on the end of the cell and a small violet-fuscous spot on the middle of the costa, where a faint irregular curved fuscous shade runs to three-fourths of the dorsum. A large triangular violet-fuscous spot is found on the costa towards the apex, where a somewhat curved series of cloudy fuscous dots runs to the dorsum before the tornus. There is a terminal series of dark fuscous dots. The hindwings are whitish ochreous, in females with the dorsal half suffused with pale grey, the apical half slightly yellowish tinged.
