= Stenoma vinifera =

Scientific classification
- Domain: Eukaryota
- Kingdom: Animalia
- Phylum: Arthropoda
- Class: Insecta
- Order: Lepidoptera
- Family: Depressariidae
- Genus: Stenoma
- Species: S. vinifera

Binomial name
- Stenoma vinifera Meyrick, 1916

Species of moth

Stenoma vinifera is a moth of the family Depressariidae. It is found in Brazil and the Guianas.

The wingspan is 20–23 mm. The forewings are whitish, with a faint lilac or purplish tinge and with the costal edge white. The basal fourth is suffused with light lilac brown, hardly definitely separated from an irregular light lilac-brown fascia about one-third, its costal edge blackish. There is a broad cloudy light lilac-brown fascia beyond the middle, its posterior edge parallel and close to a somewhat curved light lilac-brown line from four-fifths of the costa to the tornus, indented beneath the costa, both these with the costal edge blackish. A small hardly darker brown spot is found on the end of the cell partially expressed by whitish suffusion and there is a marginal series of small cloudy dark fuscous marks around the apex and termen. The hindwings are grey whitish.
