= Stenoma hospitalis =

Scientific classification
- Domain: Eukaryota
- Kingdom: Animalia
- Phylum: Arthropoda
- Class: Insecta
- Order: Lepidoptera
- Family: Depressariidae
- Genus: Stenoma
- Species: S. hospitalis

Binomial name
- Stenoma hospitalis Meyrick, 1915

Species of moth

Stenoma hospitalis is a moth of the family Depressariidae. It is found in Rio de Janeiro, Brazil.

== Description ==
The wingspan is about 29 mm. The forewings are whitish ochreous with the costal edge dark fuscous towards the base. The plical and first discal stigmata are small and ferruginous brown, the plical obliquely posterior. There are two small dark fuscous dots transversely placed on the end of the cell and there is a triangular ferruginous-brown spot on the costa somewhat beyond the middle, and a more elongate one towards the apex. A series of small ferruginous-brown dots is found from the first costal spot strongly curved around beyond the cell, then to two-thirds of the dorsum, and a curved series from the second costal spot to the dorsum before the tornus. There are also some minute marginal dots around the apex and termen. The hindwings are ochreous whitish.
