= Stenoma baliandra =

Scientific classification
- Domain: Eukaryota
- Kingdom: Animalia
- Phylum: Arthropoda
- Class: Insecta
- Order: Lepidoptera
- Family: Depressariidae
- Genus: Stenoma
- Species: S. baliandra

Binomial name
- Stenoma baliandra Meyrick, 1915

Synonyms
- Zetesima theobromae Busck, 1920

Species of moth

Stenoma baliandra is a moth of the family Depressariidae. It is found in Suriname and Guyana.

The wingspan is 15–17 mm. The forewings are fuscous, somewhat mixed with brownish ochreous in the disc and on the veins posteriorly, in males irregularly mixed and marked with whitish between this suffusion. The costal edge is more or less marked with pale ochreous, especially on the median prominence. There are five very oblique irregular curved dentate blackish lines, the first two or three sometimes indistinct, the last running from beyond the middle of the costa strongly curved to the tornus. A series of blackish marginal marks is found around the posterior part of the costa and termen. The hindwings are dark fuscous, in males strewn with blackish hairscales.

The larvae feed on Theobroma cacao.
