= Stenoma cathosiota =

Scientific classification
- Domain: Eukaryota
- Kingdom: Animalia
- Phylum: Arthropoda
- Class: Insecta
- Order: Lepidoptera
- Family: Depressariidae
- Genus: Stenoma
- Species: S. cathosiota

Binomial name
- Stenoma cathosiota Meyrick, 1925

Species of moth

Stenoma cathosiota is a moth of the family Depressariidae. It is found in Amazonas, Brazil.

The wingspan is about 31 mm. The forewings are pale lilac grey, the costal edge ochreous yellow. The stigmata are fuscous, the plical obliquely beyond the first discal. There is a spot of faint brownish suffusion on the middle of the dorsum and there is a small fuscous spot beneath the costal edge in the middle, where a series of cloudy undefined fuscous dots rather strongly excurved in the disc runs to the dorsum about three-fourths. There is a rather large triangular fuscous spot beneath the costal edge towards the apex, where a curved series of small dark fuscous dots runs to the tornus and there is a terminal series of small black dots. The hindwings are pale yellowish, the dorsal half tinged very pale grey.
