= Stenoma stupefacta =

Scientific classification
- Domain: Eukaryota
- Kingdom: Animalia
- Phylum: Arthropoda
- Class: Insecta
- Order: Lepidoptera
- Family: Depressariidae
- Genus: Stenoma
- Species: S. stupefacta

Binomial name
- Stenoma stupefacta Meyrick, 1916

Species of moth

Stenoma stupefacta is a moth of the family Depressariidae. It is found in French Guiana.

The wingspan is 23–24 mm. The forewings are whitish-lilac fuscous with the costal edge white. The stigmata are black, the first discal large and round, the others small, the plical obliquely beyond the first discal. There is some indistinct violet-fuscous suffusion towards the middle of the dorsum and a violet-fuscous spot on the middle of the costa, where an indistinct cloudy line, curved outwards round the cell, runs to three-fourths of the dorsum. There is a small indistinct violet-fuscous spot on the costa at four-fifths, where an indistinct cloudy curved line runs to the tornus and there is also a marginal row of dark fuscous dots around the apex and termen. The hindwings are yellow whitish with the apical edge greyish.
