= Stenoma gymnastis =

Scientific classification
- Domain: Eukaryota
- Kingdom: Animalia
- Phylum: Arthropoda
- Class: Insecta
- Order: Lepidoptera
- Family: Depressariidae
- Genus: Stenoma
- Species: S. gymnastis

Binomial name
- Stenoma gymnastis Meyrick, 1915

Species of moth

Stenoma gymnastis is a moth of the family Depressariidae. It is found in Guyana, French Guiana and Brazil.

The wingspan is 21–24 mm. The forewings are light greyish ochreous, the costal edge tinged with ochreous whitish. The stigmata are dark fuscous, the plical very obliquely beyond the first discal. There is a faint cloudy fuscous interrupted shade from three-fifths of the costa to two-thirds of the dorsum, forming a curved loop around the end of the cell and there is a series of cloudy fuscous dots from four-fifths of the costa to the dorsum before the tornus, sinuate-indented beneath the costa, then rather strongly curved outwards. A series of dark fuscous marginal dots is found around the apex and termen. The hindwings are ochreous whitish in males and whitish grey in females.
