= Stenoma epipacta =

Scientific classification
- Kingdom: Animalia
- Phylum: Arthropoda
- Class: Insecta
- Order: Lepidoptera
- Family: Depressariidae
- Genus: Stenoma
- Species: S. epipacta

Binomial name
- Stenoma epipacta Meyrick, 1915

Species of moth

Stenoma epipacta is a moth of the family Depressariidae. It is found in Guyana, French Guiana and Brazil.

The wingspan is about 19 mm. The forewings are greyish ochreous tinged with pinkish and with the costal edge light ochreous yellowish. There is a small blackish dot near the base in the middle. The stigmata are blackish, the plical obliquely beyond the first discal. There is an undefined blackish-grey streak from two-fifths of the costa to one-fourth of the dorsum, traversing the first discal stigma. A series of several black dots is found from the costal extremity of this streak across the second discal stigma to near the dorsum at three-fourths and there is a strongly curved series of black dots from the costa before two-thirds to the tornus, indented above the middle. There are also eight black marginal dots around the apex and termen. The hindwings are grey, with some blackish hairscales.
