= Stenoma aptila =

Scientific classification
- Domain: Eukaryota
- Kingdom: Animalia
- Phylum: Arthropoda
- Class: Insecta
- Order: Lepidoptera
- Family: Depressariidae
- Genus: Stenoma
- Species: S. aptila

Binomial name
- Stenoma aptila Meyrick, 1915

Species of moth

Stenoma aptila is a moth of the family Depressariidae. It is found in Guyana.

The wingspan is 16–21 mm. The forewings are white tinged with fuscous, more or less sprinkled with dark fuscous and with a dark fuscous dot near the base in the middle, and one on the base of the costa. There is a small dark fuscous spot on the costa at one-fourth, and larger rounded ones at the middle and four-fifths. The stigmata are small and dark fuscous, the plical midway between the discal. There is a curved cloudy fuscous shade from beneath the second costal spot to behind the cell, a curved series of cloudy dark fuscous dots from the third costal spot to the dorsum before the tornus and a marginal series of dark fuscous dots around the apex and termen. The hindwings are whitish, towards the apex faintly ochreous tinged.
