= Stenoma codicata =

Scientific classification
- Domain: Eukaryota
- Kingdom: Animalia
- Phylum: Arthropoda
- Class: Insecta
- Order: Lepidoptera
- Family: Depressariidae
- Genus: Stenoma
- Species: S. codicata

Binomial name
- Stenoma codicata Meyrick, 1916

Species of moth

Stenoma codicata is a moth of the family Depressariidae. It is found in Brazil and the Guianas.

The wingspan is 18–20 mm. The forewings are pale fuscous or greyish ochreous with a thick dark violet-fuscous streak along the basal third of the dorsum. The plical and second discal stigmata are small and dark fuscous. There is a dark fuscous dot on the base of the costa and a fuscous mark on the costa at one-fourth and a subcostal dot obliquely beyond it. There are cloudy spots on the costa at the middle and three-fourths, the first sending an indistinct irregular interrupted fuscous line behind the cell to the dorsum at four-fifths, the second a curved series of fuscous dots to the tornus. A marginal series of blackish dots is found around the apex and termen. The hindwings are rather dark grey.
