= Stenoma exhalata =

Scientific classification
- Domain: Eukaryota
- Kingdom: Animalia
- Phylum: Arthropoda
- Class: Insecta
- Order: Lepidoptera
- Family: Depressariidae
- Genus: Stenoma
- Species: S. exhalata

Binomial name
- Stenoma exhalata Meyrick, 1915

Species of moth

Stenoma exhalata is a moth of the family Depressariidae. It is found in French Guiana.

The wingspan is 21–22 mm. The forewings are whitish fuscous, violet tinged and with the extreme costal edge ochreous whitish. The stigmata are dark fuscous, the plical obliquely beyond the first discal. There are suffused dark violet-fuscous spots on the costa at the middle and four-fifths, the first sending a more or less incomplete series of cloudy dark fuscous dots to the dorsum at three-fourths, strongly curved outwards in the disc, the second sending a curved series of cloudy dark fuscous dots to the dorsum before the tornus. There is a marginal series of dark fuscous dots around the apex and termen. The hindwings are pale grey with the apical half pale yellowish except on the edge.
