= Stenoma dilinopa =

Scientific classification
- Domain: Eukaryota
- Kingdom: Animalia
- Phylum: Arthropoda
- Class: Insecta
- Order: Lepidoptera
- Family: Depressariidae
- Genus: Stenoma
- Species: S. dilinopa

Binomial name
- Stenoma dilinopa Meyrick, 1925

Species of moth

Stenoma dilinopa is a moth of the family Depressariidae. It is found in Brazil (Amazonas) and Peru.

The wingspan is 20–24 mm. The forewings are pale ochreous, the markings formed of suffused brown or ferruginous-brown irroration. There is a basal patch of which edge runs from one-fourth of the costa to the middle of the dorsum, separated by a pale streak from a moderate parallel fascia, this nearly followed by an irregular parallel line traversing a linear transverse dark fuscous mark on the end of the cell, and a pre-marginal fascia covering more than one-third of the costa and narrowed to the tornus, its anterior edge curved. There is a terminal series of small black dots. The hindwings are light ochreous yellow, the dorsal third more or less tinged grey.
