= Stenoma submersa =

Scientific classification
- Domain: Eukaryota
- Kingdom: Animalia
- Phylum: Arthropoda
- Class: Insecta
- Order: Lepidoptera
- Family: Depressariidae
- Genus: Stenoma
- Species: S. submersa

Binomial name
- Stenoma submersa Meyrick, 1915

Species of moth

Stenoma submersa is a moth of the family Depressariidae. It is found in Guyana.

The wingspan is about 23 mm. The forewings are ochreous white, with the dorsal half light grey and with an undefined blotch of dark fuscous suffusion along the basal fourth of the dorsum. There is a rhomboidal blotch of dark fuscous suffusion on the dorsum beyond the middle, reaching nearly half across the wing and a small dark fuscous spot on the end of the cell, resting on the dorsal suffusion. A somewhat curved dark grey shade is found from the tornus, reaching rather more than half across the wing, slightly whitish edged posteriorly. There is grey suffusion on the termen reaching nearly to the apex and there are some indistinct dark grey terminal dots. The hindwings are grey.
