= Stenoma dryocosma =

Scientific classification
- Kingdom: Animalia
- Phylum: Arthropoda
- Class: Insecta
- Order: Lepidoptera
- Family: Depressariidae
- Genus: Stenoma
- Species: S. dryocosma

Binomial name
- Stenoma dryocosma Meyrick, 1918

Species of moth

Stenoma dryocosma is a moth in the family Depressariidae. It was described by Edward Meyrick in 1918. It is found in the Guianas and Brazil.

The wingspan is 19–20 mm. The forewings are ochreous brown, more or less suffusedly and irregularly mixed fuscous anteriorly and with a triangular dark brown or dark fuscous postmedian costal blotch reaching somewhat more than half across the wing, including an irregular dentate transverse brownish-ochreous streak, the blotch edged posteriorly with white suffusion in the disc. The terminal area beyond this forms a broad grey band irregularly sprinkled blackish grey and whitish and there are small dark grey marginal spots around the posterior part of the costa and termen. The hindwings are grey irrorated dark fuscous.
