= Stenoma camptospila =

Scientific classification
- Domain: Eukaryota
- Kingdom: Animalia
- Phylum: Arthropoda
- Class: Insecta
- Order: Lepidoptera
- Family: Depressariidae
- Genus: Stenoma
- Species: S. camptospila

Binomial name
- Stenoma camptospila Meyrick, 1925

Species of moth

Stenoma camptospila is a moth of the family Depressariidae. It is found in Amazonas, Brazil.

The wingspan is 21–22 mm. The forewings are pale greyish ochreous with about five small blackish dots in the disc in two transverse series at about one-third and before the middle. There is a transverse dark fuscous spot filled with ochreous in the disc beyond the middle, its lower end produced obliquely towards the tornus as a dark fuscous lobe with the apex expanded. There is an undefined cloud of light fuscous suffusion on the costa towards the apex, where a hardly traceable faint pale fuscous rather curved shade runs to the tornus. There is a terminal series of small dark fuscous dots. The hindwings are whitish yellowish, yellower towards the apex.
