= Stenoma chloroxantha =

Scientific classification
- Domain: Eukaryota
- Kingdom: Animalia
- Phylum: Arthropoda
- Class: Insecta
- Order: Lepidoptera
- Family: Depressariidae
- Genus: Stenoma
- Species: S. chloroxantha

Binomial name
- Stenoma chloroxantha Meyrick, 1925

Species of moth

Stenoma chloroxantha is a moth of the family Depressariidae. It is found in Brazil (Rio Grande do Sul).

The wingspan is about 21 mm. The forewings are light ochreous brown, with a faint pinkish tinge. The plical stigma forms a round pale green spot edged with fuscous, the second discal an indistinct pale green dot. There is a light yellow triangular terminal patch, extending on the dorsum to two-thirds and narrowed to a point at the apex, edged with slight fuscous suffusion anteriorly, marked with a fine light yellow brown slightly curved line from the anterior edge above the middle to the dorsum before the tornus, and a terminal series of brownish dots. The hindwings are pale grey.
