= Stenoma aztecana =

Scientific classification
- Domain: Eukaryota
- Kingdom: Animalia
- Phylum: Arthropoda
- Class: Insecta
- Order: Lepidoptera
- Family: Depressariidae
- Genus: Stenoma
- Species: S. aztecana

Binomial name
- Stenoma aztecana Walsingham, 1913

Species of moth

Stenoma aztecana is a moth in the family Depressariidae. It was described by Lord Walsingham in 1913. It is found in Mexico (Guerrero).

The wingspan is about 20 mm. The forewings are snow white, with four dark fuscous costal spots and a marginal series of nine from apex to tornus, all clearly defined. The first spot is a little below the extreme base of the costa, the second, also a little below the costa, at one-fourth, these are connected by a bright yellow streak along the costa. The third spot, a little beyond the middle, is also separated from the costa by a few bright yellow scales. The fourth spot touches the costa but is separated from the first of the terminal series by a streak of bright yellow. The hindwings are shining pale brownish-grey.
