= Stenoma deltomis =

Scientific classification
- Domain: Eukaryota
- Kingdom: Animalia
- Phylum: Arthropoda
- Class: Insecta
- Order: Lepidoptera
- Family: Depressariidae
- Genus: Stenoma
- Species: S. deltomis

Binomial name
- Stenoma deltomis Meyrick, 1925

Species of insect

Stenoma deltomis is a moth of the family Depressariidae. It is found in Amazonas, Brazil.

The wingspan is about 33 mm. The forewings are iridescent whitish grey with the costal edge ochreous white from the flap. The stigmata are grey, the plical obliquely beyond the first discal. There is a strongly curved series of cloudy greyish dots from towards the costa at three-fifths to near the dorsum at three-fourths, interrupted in the middle by a round cloudy light grey-brownish spot. There is a strongly curved subterminal series of fuscous dots, sinuate inwards towards the costa and a terminal series of blackish-grey dots. The hindwings are light grey, becoming light greyish ochreous towards the apex.
