= Stenoma canonias =

Scientific classification
- Kingdom: Animalia
- Phylum: Arthropoda
- Class: Insecta
- Order: Lepidoptera
- Family: Depressariidae
- Genus: Stenoma
- Species: S. canonias

Binomial name
- Stenoma canonias (Meyrick, 1913)

Species of moth

Stenoma canonias is a moth in the family Depressariidae. It was described by Edward Meyrick in 1913. It is found in French Guiana.

The wingspan is about 21 mm. The forewings are pale flesh colour, more rosy towards the costa, tinged with purplish fuscous on the dorsal two-fifths and with a straight dark brown streak from one-fourth of the costa to three-fourths of the dorsum. There is a flattened-triangular dark brown spot on the costa somewhat beyond the middle. Two dark brown dots are transversely placed on the end of the cell and there is a faint brownish curved transverse line at five-sixths. A row of dark fuscous dots is found around the apex and termen. The hindwings are pale yellowish, the apical third suffused with pale rosy.
