= Stenoma fallax =

Scientific classification
- Domain: Eukaryota
- Kingdom: Animalia
- Phylum: Arthropoda
- Class: Insecta
- Order: Lepidoptera
- Family: Depressariidae
- Genus: Stenoma
- Species: S. fallax

Binomial name
- Stenoma fallax (Butler, 1877)

Synonyms
- Cryptolechia fallax Butler, 1877

Species of moth

Stenoma fallax is a moth in the family Depressariidae. It was described by Arthur Gardiner Butler in 1877. It is found in the Amazon region of Brazil.

The wingspan is about 22 mm. The forewings are pale shining greyish brown with an abbreviated oblique darker line from the base of the costa, and a second line (not abbreviated), crossing the centre of the cell, angulated upon the median vein, where it runs very obliquely to near the external angle. The discocellulars, and a subapical costal spot are dark brown and the external area is rather paler than the rest of the wing. There is a series of marginal blackish dots. The hindwings are testaceous (reddish yellow).
