= Stenoma relata =

Scientific classification
- Domain: Eukaryota
- Kingdom: Animalia
- Phylum: Arthropoda
- Class: Insecta
- Order: Lepidoptera
- Family: Depressariidae
- Genus: Stenoma
- Species: S. relata

Binomial name
- Stenoma relata Meyrick, 1925

Species of moth

Stenoma relata is a moth of the family Depressariidae. It is found in French Guiana, Brazil (Amazonas) and Peru.

The wingspan is 19–21 mm. The forewings are whitish grey with the costal edge white. The stigmata are blackish grey, the plical obliquely beyond the first discal. There is some faint grey speckling indicating an oblique shade about two-fifths and an irregular slightly curved grey shade from the middle of the costa behind the second discal stigma to the dorsum at four-fifths. A curved series of dark grey dots is found from the costa at three-fourths to the dorsum before the tornus, strongly indented towards the costa. There is a marginal series of blackish dots around the apex and termen. The hindwings are pale grey.
