= Stenoma paraplecta =

Scientific classification
- Domain: Eukaryota
- Kingdom: Animalia
- Phylum: Arthropoda
- Class: Insecta
- Order: Lepidoptera
- Family: Depressariidae
- Genus: Stenoma
- Species: S. paraplecta

Binomial name
- Stenoma paraplecta Meyrick, 1925

Species of moth

Stenoma paraplecta is a moth of the family Depressariidae. It is found in Amazonas, Brazil.

The wingspan is about 13 mm. The forewings are violet grey, the costa and dorsum suffused darker, from the base to the end of the cell mostly suffused obscurely whitish ochreous except on the costa and dorsum, and more vaguely to about four-fifths, between the cell and posterior half of the costa with four pale ochreous-yellowish gradually expanded interneural streaks ending abruptly before reaching the costa. There is a fine black marginal line around the apex and termen preceded by slender silvery-whitish-ochreous suffusion. The hindwings are grey with a dark grey marginal line around the apex.
