= Stenoma satelles =

Scientific classification
- Domain: Eukaryota
- Kingdom: Animalia
- Phylum: Arthropoda
- Class: Insecta
- Order: Lepidoptera
- Family: Depressariidae
- Genus: Stenoma
- Species: S. satelles

Binomial name
- Stenoma satelles Meyrick, 1925

Species of moth

Stenoma satelles is a moth of the family Depressariidae. It is found in Amazonas, Brazil.

The wingspan is about 26 mm. The forewings are very pale whitish grey, the costal edge whitish. The stigmata are grey, the plical small, very obliquely beyond the first discal, the second discal darker. There are small dark grey spots beneath the costal edge at the middle and four-fifths, from the first a strongly excurved series of indistinct grey dots runs to the dorsum at five-sixths, indented on the fold, from the second a moderately curved series of grey dots to the tornus. There is a terminal series of dark grey dots. The hindwings are whitish ochreous, the dorsal half very faintly tinged grey.
