= Stenoma ochricollis =

Scientific classification
- Kingdom: Animalia
- Phylum: Arthropoda
- Clade: Pancrustacea
- Class: Insecta
- Order: Lepidoptera
- Family: Depressariidae
- Genus: Stenoma
- Species: S. ochricollis

Binomial name
- Stenoma ochricollis (Zeller, 1877)

Synonyms
- Cryptolechia ochricollis Zeller, 1877; Stenoma marginata Busck, 1914; Stenoma atmodes Meyrick, 1915; Stenoma thymiota Meyrick, 1915

Species of moth

Stenoma ochricollis is a moth of the family Depressariidae. It is found in Guyana, Panama and Peru.

The wingspan is 15–18 mm. The forewings are dark violet grey or dark purple grey with the costal edge whitish yellowish or ochreous whitish. The plical and second discal stigmata are moderate and blackish and there are nine blackish marginal dots around the apex and termen. The hindwings are rather dark grey.
