= Stenoma congrua =

Scientific classification
- Domain: Eukaryota
- Kingdom: Animalia
- Phylum: Arthropoda
- Class: Insecta
- Order: Lepidoptera
- Family: Depressariidae
- Genus: Stenoma
- Species: S. congrua

Binomial name
- Stenoma congrua Meyrick, 1925

Species of moth

Stenoma congrua is a moth of the family Depressariidae. It is found in Peru.

The wingspan is about 15 mm. The forewings are ochreous white, with some irregular fuscous sprinkling, especially beyond the cell. There is a slight dark fuscous mark on the base of the costa and the second discal stigma is blackish. There are three oblique blackish costal spots, the first at one-third, small, the second in the middle, moderate, the third at four-fifths, elongate-semi-oval, from the end of this a somewhat curved dentate fuscous shade near the termen to the tornus. There is also a marginal series of black dots around the apex and termen. The hindwings are light grey with the terminal edge suffused darker.
