= Stenoma fusistrigella =

Scientific classification
- Kingdom: Animalia
- Phylum: Arthropoda
- Class: Insecta
- Order: Lepidoptera
- Family: Depressariidae
- Genus: Stenoma
- Species: S. fusistrigella

Binomial name
- Stenoma fusistrigella (Walker, 1864)

Synonyms
- Cryptolechia fusistrigella Walker, 1864; Cryptolechia faecosa Felder & Rogenhofer, 1875

Species of moth

Stenoma fusistrigella is a moth of the family Depressariidae. It is found in Brazil (Amazonas).

Adults are very pale fawn colour with broad wings, the forewings rectangular at the tips, with a diffuse oblique dark fawn-coloured band, which extends from before the middle of the costa to the base of the interior border. There is a blackish point in the disc at two-thirds of the length and there are very minute marginal points of dark fawn colour. The exterior border is nearly straight and hardly oblique. The hindwings are yellowish cinereous.
