= Stenoma xylinopa =

Scientific classification
- Domain: Eukaryota
- Kingdom: Animalia
- Phylum: Arthropoda
- Class: Insecta
- Order: Lepidoptera
- Family: Depressariidae
- Genus: Stenoma
- Species: S. xylinopa

Binomial name
- Stenoma xylinopa Meyrick, 1925

Synonyms
- Stenopa xylinopa

Species of moth

Stenoma xylinopa is a moth of the family Depressariidae. It is found in Bolivia.

== Characteristics ==
The wingspan is about 28 mm. The forewings are light brown, the costal edge obscurely ochreous whitish. The stigmata are small, dark fuscous, the plical very obliquely beyond the first discal. There are dark fuscous triangular spots on the costa beyond the middle and at four-fifths, from the second a curved series of small indistinct fuscous dots to before the tornus. There is also a marginal series of small dark fuscous dots around the apex and termen. The hindwings are dark grey.
