= Stenoma persita =

Scientific classification
- Domain: Eukaryota
- Kingdom: Animalia
- Phylum: Arthropoda
- Class: Insecta
- Order: Lepidoptera
- Family: Depressariidae
- Genus: Stenoma
- Species: S. persita

Binomial name
- Stenoma persita Meyrick, 1915

Species of moth

Stenoma persita is a moth of the family Depressariidae. It is found in Peru.

The wingspan is about 19 mm. The forewings are pale greyish ochreous, sprinkled throughout with dark fuscous and with a small dark fuscous spot on the costa at one-fourth, and larger ones at the middle and three-fourths. The stigmata are dark fuscous and obscure, the plical very obliquely beyond the first discal, some fuscous suffusion behind the second discal. A curved series of indistinct fuscous dots is found from the third costal spot to the dorsum before the tornus and there is a marginal series of dark fuscous dots around the apex and termen. The hindwings are grey.
