= Stenoma neoptila =

Scientific classification
- Domain: Eukaryota
- Kingdom: Animalia
- Phylum: Arthropoda
- Class: Insecta
- Order: Lepidoptera
- Family: Depressariidae
- Genus: Stenoma
- Species: S. neoptila

Binomial name
- Stenoma neoptila Meyrick, 1925

Species of moth

Stenoma neoptila is a moth of the family Depressariidae. It is found in Brazil.

The wingspan is about 25 mm. The forewings are white, the costal edge whitish ochreous and with a dark fuscous patch extending along the anterior half of the dorsum but leaving the dorsum slenderly ochreous white, reaching nearly half across the wing, at the base touching the costa, immediately beyond it a pale ochreous triangular dorsal blotch, followed by an inwards-oblique broad dark fuscous fasciate blotch from the tornus reaching three-fourths across the wing, suffused posteriorly and above. The hindwings are yellow whitish.
