= Stenoma tetrabola =

Scientific classification
- Kingdom: Animalia
- Phylum: Arthropoda
- Class: Insecta
- Order: Lepidoptera
- Family: Depressariidae
- Genus: Stenoma
- Species: S. tetrabola

Binomial name
- Stenoma tetrabola Meyrick, 1913

Species of moth

Stenoma tetrabola is a moth in the family Depressariidae. It was described by Edward Meyrick in 1913. It is found in Peru.

The wingspan is about 33 mm. The forewings are pale greyish ochreous with the costal edge blackish towards the base and with a small black spot near the base in the middle. The stigmata form around the black spots, the plical and second discal largest, the plical very obliquely beyond the first discal. A rather irregular strongly curved series of indistinct sub-crescentic dots of blackish irroration is found from two-thirds of the costa to the dorsum before the tornus, approaching the termen in the middle and there is a terminal row of black dots. The hindwings are grey.
