= Stenoma clysmographa =

Scientific classification
- Kingdom: Animalia
- Phylum: Arthropoda
- Class: Insecta
- Order: Lepidoptera
- Family: Depressariidae
- Genus: Stenoma
- Species: S. clysmographa

Binomial name
- Stenoma clysmographa Meyrick, 1925

Species of moth

Stenoma clysmographa is a moth of the family Depressariidae. It is found in Peru.

The wingspan is about 30 mm. The forewings are brown with suffused, pale greyish markings. There is an irregular blotch towards the costa before the middle, a roundish spot about the fold beneath this, two small dots longitudinally placed in the disc beyond the middle, some slight irroration towards the costa about two-thirds, a curved subterminal shade from above the middle to the dorsum, thickened in the disc and with a waved posterior edge, and a terminal streak becoming obsolete towards the extremities. There is also a terminal row of dark fuscous dots. The hindwings are dark fuscous.
