= Stenoma chionogramma =

Scientific classification
- Kingdom: Animalia
- Phylum: Arthropoda
- Class: Insecta
- Order: Lepidoptera
- Family: Depressariidae
- Genus: Stenoma
- Species: S. chionogramma

Binomial name
- Stenoma chionogramma (Meyrick, 1909)

Synonyms
- Orphnolechia chionogramma Meyrick, 1909; Stenoma rectificata Meyrick, 1925

Species of moth

Stenoma chionogramma is a moth in the family Depressariidae. It was described by Edward Meyrick in 1909. It is found in Brazil (Amazonas), Peru and Bolivia.

The wingspan is about 12 mm. The forewings are dark fuscous, slightly bronzy tinged and with a slightly curved white line from the middle of the costa to the dorsum beyond the middle, as well as a transverse streak of scattered white irroration before the termen. The hindwings are dark bronzy fuscous, lighter towards the base.
