= Stenoma alligans =

Scientific classification
- Domain: Eukaryota
- Kingdom: Animalia
- Phylum: Arthropoda
- Class: Insecta
- Order: Lepidoptera
- Family: Depressariidae
- Genus: Stenoma
- Species: S. alligans

Binomial name
- Stenoma alligans (Butler, 1877)

Synonyms
- Cryptolechia alligans Butler, 1877; Stenoma obelodes Meyrick, 1915

Species of moth

Stenoma alligans is a moth of the family Depressariidae. It is found in the Amazon region.

The wingspan is about 20 mm. The forewings are ochreous brown, slightly crimson tinged and with the extreme costal edge orange. There is a very slender dark brown dorsal streak from one-fourth to near the tornus. The plical and second discal stigmata are very small and fuscous. The terminal edge is slenderly suffused with ferruginous brown. The hindwings are rather light greyish fulvous with the dorsal half grey.
