= Stenoma oblita =

Scientific classification
- Domain: Eukaryota
- Kingdom: Animalia
- Phylum: Arthropoda
- Class: Insecta
- Order: Lepidoptera
- Family: Depressariidae
- Genus: Stenoma
- Species: S. oblita

Binomial name
- Stenoma oblita (Butler, 1877)

Synonyms
- Cryptolechia oblita Butler, 1877; Stenoma patula Meyrick, 1916

Species of moth

Stenoma oblita is a moth of the family Depressariidae. It is found in Brazil (Amazonas) and French Guiana.

The wingspan is about 21 mm (0.83 in). The forewings are light fuscous, faintly violet tinged, the extreme costal edge ochreous whitish. The plical and second discal stigmata are dark fuscous and there are two faint curved posterior lines hardly perceptibly indicated. There is also a terminal series of dark fuscous dots. The hindwings are ochreous-whitish grey.
