= Stenoma neurocentra =

Scientific classification
- Domain: Eukaryota
- Kingdom: Animalia
- Phylum: Arthropoda
- Class: Insecta
- Order: Lepidoptera
- Family: Depressariidae
- Genus: Stenoma
- Species: S. neurocentra

Binomial name
- Stenoma neurocentra Meyrick, 1925

Species of moth

Stenoma neurocentra is a moth of the family Depressariidae. It is found in Peru.

The wingspan is about 13 mm. The forewings are light grey with a black dot on the base of the fold, where a short thick dark fuscous streak runs along the base of the dorsum. The stigmata are blackish, the discal small, the plical rather large, very obliquely beyond the first discal, the second discal traversed by a hardly curved dark fuscous streak from the costa at three-fifths to the dorsum at four-fifths, suffused posteriorly. There is a strongly curved subterminal series of five black dots on the veins. The hindwings are grey.
