= Stenoma adytodes =

Scientific classification
- Domain: Eukaryota
- Kingdom: Animalia
- Phylum: Arthropoda
- Class: Insecta
- Order: Lepidoptera
- Family: Depressariidae
- Genus: Stenoma
- Species: S. adytodes

Binomial name
- Stenoma adytodes Meyrick, 1925

Species of moth

Stenoma adytodes is a moth of the family Depressariidae. It is found in Peru.

The wingspan is 26–28 mm. The forewings are dark fuscous with a broad white costal streak from near the base to beyond the middle, the ends pointed, the costal edge pale ochreous. There is an irregular-edged rounded white apical blotch extending on the costa to two-thirds and a slender pale brownish-ochreous dorsal streak throughout, expanded into a triangular postmedian blotch tipped white, the tornal extremity also white. The hindwings are whitish ochreous suffused light grey, with the apex whitish.
