= Stenoma homala =

Scientific classification
- Kingdom: Animalia
- Phylum: Arthropoda
- Clade: Pancrustacea
- Class: Insecta
- Order: Lepidoptera
- Family: Depressariidae
- Genus: Stenoma
- Species: S. homala

Binomial name
- Stenoma homala Walsingham, 1912

Species of moth

Stenoma homala is a moth in the family Depressariidae. It was described by Lord Walsingham in 1912. It is found in Tabasco, Mexico.

The wingspan is about 18 mm. The forewings are bone grey, with dark brown marginal spots, one near the base of the costa, one scarcely beyond its middle, one a little beyond the flexus and another more elongate on the middle of the dorsum. A small spot at the end of the cell another in the fold and a series around the apex and termen are less strongly indicated. In conjunction with the first dorsal spot are a few projecting ochreous marginal scales. The hindwings are brownish grey.
