= Stenoma milichodes =

Scientific classification
- Domain: Eukaryota
- Kingdom: Animalia
- Phylum: Arthropoda
- Class: Insecta
- Order: Lepidoptera
- Family: Depressariidae
- Genus: Stenoma
- Species: S. milichodes

Binomial name
- Stenoma milichodes Meyrick, 1915

Species of moth

Stenoma milichodes is a moth of the family Depressariidae. It is found in Colombia.

The wingspan is 23–24 mm. The forewings are yellowish brown suffused with ferruginous, with purple reflections and with the extreme costal edge ochreous whitish. The stigmata are dark purple fuscous, the plical obliquely beyond the first discal and with some darker suffusion above the first discal stigma. There is a triangular undefined spot on the middle of the costa where a streak runs to the second discal, and a curved subteriuinal line before the apex and upper part of the termen. The hindwings are yellow whitish.
