= Stenoma pyrrhonota =

Scientific classification
- Kingdom: Animalia
- Phylum: Arthropoda
- Class: Insecta
- Order: Lepidoptera
- Family: Depressariidae
- Genus: Stenoma
- Species: S. pyrrhonota

Binomial name
- Stenoma pyrrhonota Meyrick, 1915

Species of moth

Stenoma pyrrhonota is a moth of the family Depressariidae. It is found in Guyana.

The wingspan is about 13 mm. The forewings are white, irregularly sprinkled with dark grey and with an irregular-edged broad red-brown dorsal stripe sprinkled with black occupying about two-fifths of the wing throughout. There is an irregular dark grey blotch on the base of the costa and two irregular patches of fuscous suffusion sprinkled with blackish on the costa before and beyond the middle, and one in the disc between these. The hindwings are dark grey, strewn with blackish-pointed hairscales.
