= Stenoma graphica =

Scientific classification
- Domain: Eukaryota
- Kingdom: Animalia
- Phylum: Arthropoda
- Class: Insecta
- Order: Lepidoptera
- Family: Depressariidae
- Genus: Stenoma
- Species: S. graphica

Binomial name
- Stenoma graphica Busck, 1920

Species of moth

Stenoma graphica is a moth in the family Depressariidae. It was described by August Busck in 1920. It is found in Costa Rica.

The wingspan is about 23 mm. The forewings are dark olive brown with the costal edge and apical part of the terminal edge broadly light ochreous nearly white, strongly contrasting with the dark wing. There is a small ochreous white tornal area with concolorous cilia. The middle part of the terminal cilia is dark brown concolorous with the wing. The hindwings are light brown with the extreme apex ochreous white. There is a flat projecting costal scale tuft at the apical fourth.
