= Stenoma adulans =

Scientific classification
- Domain: Eukaryota
- Kingdom: Animalia
- Phylum: Arthropoda
- Class: Insecta
- Order: Lepidoptera
- Family: Depressariidae
- Genus: Stenoma
- Species: S. adulans

Binomial name
- Stenoma adulans Meyrick, 1925

Synonyms
- Stenoma malacoxesta Meyrick, 1930

Species of moth

Stenoma adulans is a moth of the family Depressariidae. It is found in Peru and Pará, Brazil.

The wingspan is about 19 mm. The forewings are pale violet grey with the costal edge whitish ochreous. The plical and second discal stigmata are blackish grey. There is an evenly curved grey line from a blackish-grey thickening on the costa at four-fifths near the termen to the tornus. A marginal series of blackish dots are found around the apical part of the costa and termen. The hindwings are rather dark grey.
