= Stenoma melinopa =

Scientific classification
- Kingdom: Animalia
- Phylum: Arthropoda
- Class: Insecta
- Order: Lepidoptera
- Family: Depressariidae
- Genus: Stenoma
- Species: S. melinopa

Binomial name
- Stenoma melinopa Meyrick, 1925

Species of moth

Stenoma melinopa is a moth of the family Depressariidae. It is found in Amazonas, Brazil.

The wingspan is 18–20 mm. The forewings are light greyish ochreous with strewn dark grey dots and strigulae and the costal edge is light ochreous except towards the extremities. There is an undefined spot of grey suffusion about the middle of the costa and there is a round ochreous-greenish spot on the end of the cell, enclosing a more or less expressed blackish dot, beneath this is a small white dot. There is sometimes an indistinct spot of a greenish tinge before the tornus. The hindwings are pale greyish.
