= Stenoma eusticta =

Scientific classification
- Domain: Eukaryota
- Kingdom: Animalia
- Phylum: Arthropoda
- Class: Insecta
- Order: Lepidoptera
- Family: Depressariidae
- Genus: Stenoma
- Species: S. eusticta

Binomial name
- Stenoma eusticta Meyrick, 1916

Species of moth

Stenoma eusticta is a moth of the family Depressariidae. It is found in Brazil and the Guianas.

The wingspan is 18–19 mm. The forewings are lilac whitish with the costal edge ochreous yellow with about seven black dots, the extreme costal edge towards the base blackish and the basal third and a broad irregular purple fascia occupying most of the median third. A sinuate-curved dotted grey line is found from three-fourths of the costa to the dorsum before the tornus and there is a grey terminal line. The hindwings are whitish grey, with the terminal edge dark grey.
