= Stenoma melanesia =

Scientific classification
- Kingdom: Animalia
- Phylum: Arthropoda
- Class: Insecta
- Order: Lepidoptera
- Family: Depressariidae
- Genus: Stenoma
- Species: S. melanesia

Binomial name
- Stenoma melanesia Meyrick, 1912

Species of moth

Stenoma melanesia is a moth of the family Depressariidae. It is found in Colombia.

The wingspan is about 18 mm. The forewings are light bronzy brownish with a small blackish spot on the costa at one-fourth and a slightly outwards-curved series of six small black spots from the costa before the middle to the base of the dorsum, and a strongly outwards-curved series of small black spots from the costa beyond the middle to the tornus, the area between these wholly strewn with small black spots and suffused with ashy grey except for a suffused spot of roundcolour towards the middle of the dorsum. The hindwings are dark fuscous.
