= Stenoma suffumata =

Scientific classification
- Domain: Eukaryota
- Kingdom: Animalia
- Phylum: Arthropoda
- Class: Insecta
- Order: Lepidoptera
- Family: Depressariidae
- Genus: Stenoma
- Species: S. suffumata

Binomial name
- Stenoma suffumata (Walsingham, 1897)

Synonyms
- Antaeotricha suffumata Walsingham, 1897

Species of moth

Stenoma suffumata is a moth in the family Depressariidae. It was described by Lord Walsingham in 1897. It is found in the West Indies (Grenada).

The wingspan is 16–20 mm. The forewings are shining white, the extreme costa delicately shaded with smoky brown and also the dorsal third of the wing from the base below the fold and beyond it to the termen above the tornus. The hindwings are pale smoky greyish, the males with a long brush of greyish hairs from the base of the costa.
