= Stenoma dryaula =

Scientific classification
- Domain: Eukaryota
- Kingdom: Animalia
- Phylum: Arthropoda
- Class: Insecta
- Order: Lepidoptera
- Family: Depressariidae
- Genus: Stenoma
- Species: S. dryaula

Binomial name
- Stenoma dryaula Meyrick, 1925

Species of moth

Stenoma dryaula is a moth of the family Depressariidae. It is found in Paraguay and Brazil (Amazonas).

The wingspan is 14–15 mm. The forewings are whitish ochreous, the dorsal half slightly brownish tinged. There is a moderate brown median streak from the base to the apex, the upper edge somewhat mixed dark fuscous, the lower rather suffused. The second discal stigma is black, the plical also but smaller and sometimes obsolete. There is a marginal series of black dots around the apical part of the costa and termen. The hindwings are light grey.
