= Stenoma corvula =

Scientific classification
- Kingdom: Animalia
- Phylum: Arthropoda
- Class: Insecta
- Order: Lepidoptera
- Family: Depressariidae
- Genus: Stenoma
- Species: S. corvula

Binomial name
- Stenoma corvula (Meyrick, 1912)

Synonyms
- Antaeotricha corvula Meyrick, 1912

Species of moth

Stenoma corvula is a moth of the family Depressariidae. It is found in Colombia.

The wingspan is about 21 mm. The forewings are dark purplish fuscous with the plical stigma black, connected with the base by a fine blackish line along the fold. The second discal stigma is black, followed by some slight scattered yellow-whitish irroration. The hindwings are dark fuscous, the costa with long dense projecting dark grey scales from near the base to the middle, sinuate beyond this, with a small tuft of scales beyond the sinuation.
