= Stenoma apsorrhoa =

Scientific classification
- Domain: Eukaryota
- Kingdom: Animalia
- Phylum: Arthropoda
- Class: Insecta
- Order: Lepidoptera
- Family: Depressariidae
- Genus: Stenoma
- Species: S. apsorrhoa

Binomial name
- Stenoma apsorrhoa Meyrick, 1915

Species of moth

Stenoma apsorrhoa is a moth in the family Depressariidae. It was described by Edward Meyrick in 1915. It is found in Guyana and Peru.

The wingspan is 13–18 mm. The forewings are brown grey or fuscous with a white line along the costa throughout, more or less thickened towards the base, continued around the termen somewhat waved to the tornus. There is a somewhat irregular slightly curved or bent white line from the middle of the costa to two-thirds of the dorsum. The hindwings are rather dark grey, darker in females.
