= Stenoma albida =

Scientific classification
- Kingdom: Animalia
- Phylum: Arthropoda
- Class: Insecta
- Order: Lepidoptera
- Family: Depressariidae
- Genus: Stenoma
- Species: S. albida

Binomial name
- Stenoma albida (Walker, 1864)

Synonyms
- Cryptolechia disjecta var. albida Walker, 1864

Species of moth

Stenoma albida is a moth of the family Depressariidae. It is found in Brazil.

Adults are whitish with broad wings, the forewings slightly rounded at the tips, with six or seven brown streaks in front and two longer and hinder brown streaks extending from the base of the wing, narrowly divided from a large brown spot. A second large brown spot is found beyond the first one and resting on the interior angle and there is a row of submarginal brown streaks. The exterior border is nearly straight and not oblique. The hindwings are brownish cinereous.
