= Stenoma simplex =

Scientific classification
- Kingdom: Animalia
- Phylum: Arthropoda
- Class: Insecta
- Order: Lepidoptera
- Family: Depressariidae
- Genus: Stenoma
- Species: S. simplex

Binomial name
- Stenoma simplex Busck, 1914

Species of moth

Stenoma simplex is a moth in the family Depressariidae. It was described by August Busck in 1914. It is found in Panama.

The wingspan is 14–15 mm. The forewings are dark brown, nearly black, with a violaceous sheen and with the extreme costal edge narrowly white. There is a thin, white, broken, zigzag line across the wing from the middle of the costa over the end of the cell to the apical third of the dorsum, but not quite reaching the dorsal edge. A small white spot with a black center is found at the apex and there is a faint row of small white dots along the terminal edge. The hindwings are blackish brown.
