= Stenoma caesarea =

Scientific classification
- Domain: Eukaryota
- Kingdom: Animalia
- Phylum: Arthropoda
- Class: Insecta
- Order: Lepidoptera
- Family: Depressariidae
- Genus: Stenoma
- Species: S. caesarea

Binomial name
- Stenoma caesarea Meyrick, 1915

Species of moth

Stenoma caesarea is a moth of the family Depressariidae. It is found in Guyana and Brazil.

The wingspan is 18–25 mm. The forewings are glossy light or dark violet-slaty grey with the extreme costal edge ochreous whitish. There is a small whitish-ochreous spot or mark on the costa at two-fifths, and a small cloudy ochreous-whitish spot just beneath it. A cloudy dark fuscous spot is found on the end of the cell and the terminal edge is obscurely whitish. The hindwings are grey.
