= Stenoma crambina =

Scientific classification
- Domain: Eukaryota
- Kingdom: Animalia
- Phylum: Arthropoda
- Class: Insecta
- Order: Lepidoptera
- Family: Depressariidae
- Genus: Stenoma
- Species: S. crambina

Binomial name
- Stenoma crambina (Busck, 1920)

Species of moth

Stenoma crambina is a moth in the family Depressariidae. It was described by August Busck in 1920. It is found in Mexico.

The wingspan is 25–33 mm. The forewings are stone white with a brownish tint suffused on the dorsal third and along the veins with dark fuscous. There is a black dot at the end of the cell and a series of very indistinct marginal dark fuscous dots along the terminal edge. The hindwings are very pale yellowish fuscous (nearly white), somewhat darker toward the apex and with a thin brownish line in the white cilia.
