= Stenoma ochropa =

Scientific classification
- Domain: Eukaryota
- Kingdom: Animalia
- Phylum: Arthropoda
- Class: Insecta
- Order: Lepidoptera
- Family: Depressariidae
- Genus: Stenoma
- Species: S. ochropa

Binomial name
- Stenoma ochropa Walsingham, 1913

Synonyms
- Catarata ocellata Busck, 1914

Species of moth

Stenoma ochropa is a moth in the family Depressariidae. It was described by Lord Walsingham in 1913. It is found in Panama.

The wingspan is about 18 mm. The forewings are brownish grey, the costa narrowly tinged, especially beyond the middle, with coppery brown extending a little below the rounded apex. A slight stain of the same colour is visible toward the outer end of the cell, and around it are scattered a few whitish scales. The hindwings are dark brown.
