= Stenoma augescens =

Scientific classification
- Domain: Eukaryota
- Kingdom: Animalia
- Phylum: Arthropoda
- Class: Insecta
- Order: Lepidoptera
- Family: Depressariidae
- Genus: Stenoma
- Species: S. augescens

Binomial name
- Stenoma augescens Meyrick, 1925

Species of moth

Stenoma augescens is a moth of the family Depressariidae. It is found in Peru.

The wingspan is about 39 mm. The forewings are light brown with the costal edge pale ochreous. The plical stigma is very small, elongate and dark fuscous, the second discal forming a rather large roundish dark fuscous spot. There is a subterminal series of indistinct fuscous subcrescentic dots sinuate inwards towards the costa. A marginal series of dark fuscous dots is found around the apex and termen. The hindwings are rather dark grey.
