= Stenoma chalepa =

Scientific classification
- Domain: Eukaryota
- Kingdom: Animalia
- Phylum: Arthropoda
- Class: Insecta
- Order: Lepidoptera
- Family: Depressariidae
- Genus: Stenoma
- Species: S. chalepa

Binomial name
- Stenoma chalepa Walsingham, 1913

Species of moth

Stenoma chalepa is a moth in the family Depressariidae. It was described by Lord Walsingham in 1913. It is found in Panama.

The wingspan is about 22 mm. The forewings are dark fuscous, mottled with dull fawn ochreous near the base, the greater portion of their surface beyond being sprinkled with slender elongate bluish white hair-scales, from which the costa and an ill-defined reduplicated subapical band, parallel with the margin, are comparatively free. The hindwings are umber brown.
