= Stenoma adustella =

Scientific classification
- Domain: Eukaryota
- Kingdom: Animalia
- Phylum: Arthropoda
- Class: Insecta
- Order: Lepidoptera
- Family: Depressariidae
- Genus: Stenoma
- Species: S. adustella

Binomial name
- Stenoma adustella (Walker, 1864)

Synonyms
- Cryptolechia adustella Walker, 1864

Species of moth

Stenoma adustella is a moth of the family Depressariidae. It is found in Venezuela.

Adults are a very pale cinereous fawn color, with rather broad wings. The forewings are rounded at the tips and feature a broad blackish band that contains several longitudinal streaks of the ground color. This band is much widened toward the interior border and has an irregular outline. There are few blackish submarginal points forming a line which is retracted to the band near the costa.
