= Stenoma stolida =

Scientific classification
- Kingdom: Animalia
- Phylum: Arthropoda
- Class: Insecta
- Order: Lepidoptera
- Family: Depressariidae
- Genus: Stenoma
- Species: S. stolida

Binomial name
- Stenoma stolida Meyrick, 1911

Species of moth

Stenoma stolida is a moth in the family Depressariidae. It was described by Edward Meyrick in 1911. It is found in South Africa.

The wingspan is 25–32 mm. The forewings are fuscous, suffused with dark fuscous towards the costa and on the veins posteriorly, elsewhere suffusedly mixed with grey whitish. There is a transverse linear blackish mark on the end of the cell, edged with whitish suffusion. There is also a terminal series of blackish dots. The hindwings are grey, lighter anteriorly.
