= Stenoma conveniens =

Scientific classification
- Domain: Eukaryota
- Kingdom: Animalia
- Phylum: Arthropoda
- Class: Insecta
- Order: Lepidoptera
- Family: Depressariidae
- Genus: Stenoma
- Species: S. conveniens

Binomial name
- Stenoma conveniens Meyrick, 1925

Species of moth

Stenoma conveniens is a moth of the family Depressariidae. It is found in Amazonas, Brazil.

The wingspan is about 14 mm. The forewings are whitish ochreous, all veins marked brownish-ochreous lines, these not reaching the margin but connected by a curved pre-terminal shade, on the lower angle of the cell a slight thickening of dark fuscous suffusion. There is a marginal series of black dots around the apical part of the costa and termen. The hindwings are light grey.
