= Stenoma icteropis =

Scientific classification
- Domain: Eukaryota
- Kingdom: Animalia
- Phylum: Arthropoda
- Class: Insecta
- Order: Lepidoptera
- Family: Depressariidae
- Genus: Stenoma
- Species: S. icteropis

Binomial name
- Stenoma icteropis Meyrick, 1925

Species of moth

Stenoma icteropis is a moth of the family Depressariidae. It is found in Pará, Brazil.

The wingspan is 13–14 mm. The forewings are pale violet grey, sometimes suffused whitish ochreous and with a short yellow-ochreous mark from the middle of the base. There is a slender yellow-ochreous costal streak from the base to about the middle and a suffused ochreous-whitish bar on the end of the cell. The hindwings are light grey.
