= Stenoma evanescens =

Scientific classification
- Domain: Eukaryota
- Kingdom: Animalia
- Phylum: Arthropoda
- Class: Insecta
- Order: Lepidoptera
- Family: Depressariidae
- Genus: Stenoma
- Species: S. evanescens

Binomial name
- Stenoma evanescens (Butler, 1877)

Synonyms
- Cryptolechia evanescens Butler, 1877

Species of moth

Stenoma evanescens is a moth in the family Depressariidae. It was described by Arthur Gardiner Butler in 1877. It is found in the Amazon region of Brazil.

The wingspan is about 25 mm. The wings are shining pale greyish brown or dove colour, the forewings slightly paler than the hindwings, with a blackish dot at the end of the cell, and a second below it.
