= Stenoma mniodora =

Scientific classification
- Domain: Eukaryota
- Kingdom: Animalia
- Phylum: Arthropoda
- Class: Insecta
- Order: Lepidoptera
- Family: Depressariidae
- Genus: Stenoma
- Species: S. mniodora

Binomial name
- Stenoma mniodora Meyrick, 1925

Species of moth

Stenoma mniodora is a moth of the family Depressariidae. It is found in Colombia.

The wingspan is about 22 mm. The forewings are light moss green with the markings deep moss green and with a rather oblique fasciate blotch from the dorsum towards the base reaching half across the wing. There is a moderate spot on the middle of the costa and a linear transverse mark on the end of the cell. There is a straight transverse subterminal line. The hindwings are green whitish.
