= Stenoma uncticoma =

Scientific classification
- Domain: Eukaryota
- Kingdom: Animalia
- Phylum: Arthropoda
- Class: Insecta
- Order: Lepidoptera
- Family: Depressariidae
- Genus: Stenoma
- Species: S. uncticoma

Binomial name
- Stenoma uncticoma Meyrick, 1916

Species of moth

Stenoma uncticoma is a moth of the family Depressariidae. It is found in Brazil and the Guianas.

The wingspan is 13–14 mm. The forewings are violet grey, the costa slenderly white. There are two very short fine whitish dashes from the base and a somewhat irregular slightly curved white line from three-fifths of the costa to three-fourths of the dorsum, edged posteriorly with dark fuscous. The hindwings are grey.
