= Stenoma orneopis =

Scientific classification
- Kingdom: Animalia
- Phylum: Arthropoda
- Clade: Pancrustacea
- Class: Insecta
- Order: Lepidoptera
- Family: Depressariidae
- Genus: Stenoma
- Species: S. orneopis

Binomial name
- Stenoma orneopis Meyrick, 1925

Species of moth

Stenoma orneopis is a moth of the family Depressariidae. It is found in Amazonas, Brazil.

The wingspan is about 14 mm. The forewings are ochreous-grey brownish, with a strong violet gloss. The extreme costal edge is white and there is a rounded rosy-ochreous spot on the end of the cell, obscurely edged whitish. Several minute whitish dots are found on the apical margin. The hindwings are blackish grey.
