= Stenoma vitreola =

Scientific classification
- Domain: Eukaryota
- Kingdom: Animalia
- Phylum: Arthropoda
- Class: Insecta
- Order: Lepidoptera
- Family: Depressariidae
- Genus: Stenoma
- Species: S. vitreola

Binomial name
- Stenoma vitreola Meyrick, 1925

Species of moth

Stenoma vitreola is a moth of the family Depressariidae. It is found in Pará, Brazil.

The wingspan is about 12 mm. The forewings are light silvery grey, with whitish reflections between the veins posteriorly and with the dorsal area darker grey. The costal edge is white and the second discal stigma is cloudy and dark grey, from beneath it an oblique white streak to near the dorsum before the tornus. The hindwings are light grey.
