= Stenoma pyramidea =

Scientific classification
- Domain: Eukaryota
- Kingdom: Animalia
- Phylum: Arthropoda
- Class: Insecta
- Order: Lepidoptera
- Family: Depressariidae
- Genus: Stenoma
- Species: S. pyramidea

Binomial name
- Stenoma pyramidea Walsingham, 1913

Species of moth

Stenoma pyramidea is a moth in the family Depressariidae. It was described by Lord Walsingham in 1913. It is found in Guatemala.

The wingspan is 21–23 mm. The forewings are pale reddish fawn, shading to tawny on the dorsal half. A triangular pale reddish fawn dorsal patch beyond the middle, its apex reaching the lower margin of the cell. The hindwings are fawn grey.
