= Stenoma horocyma =

Scientific classification
- Domain: Eukaryota
- Kingdom: Animalia
- Phylum: Arthropoda
- Class: Insecta
- Order: Lepidoptera
- Family: Depressariidae
- Genus: Stenoma
- Species: S. horocyma

Binomial name
- Stenoma horocyma Meyrick, 1925

Species of moth

Stenoma horocyma is a moth of the family Depressariidae. It is found in Amazonas, Brazil.

The wingspan is about 10 mm. The forewings are glossy dark indigo-blue grey with the costal edge white. There are white marks on the costa before and beyond the middle. The second discal stigma is white and there is a waved white line just within the margin around the posterior part of the costa and termen. The hindwings are grey.
