= Stenoma leptogma =

Scientific classification
- Domain: Eukaryota
- Kingdom: Animalia
- Phylum: Arthropoda
- Class: Insecta
- Order: Lepidoptera
- Family: Depressariidae
- Genus: Stenoma
- Species: S. leptogma

Binomial name
- Stenoma leptogma Meyrick, 1925

Species of moth

Stenoma leptogma is a moth of the family Depressariidae. It is found in Colombia and Rio de Janeiro, Brazil.

The wingspan is about 29 mm. The forewings are whitish ochreous, the veins marked with very fine light brown lines, fainter brownish-ochreous interneural lines between these. There are very small dark grey dots on both angles of the cell. The hindwings are pale whitish grey.
