= Stenoma orthographa =

Scientific classification
- Domain: Eukaryota
- Kingdom: Animalia
- Phylum: Arthropoda
- Class: Insecta
- Order: Lepidoptera
- Family: Depressariidae
- Genus: Stenoma
- Species: S. orthographa

Binomial name
- Stenoma orthographa Meyrick, 1925

Species of moth

Stenoma orthographa is a moth of the family Depressariidae. It is found in Brazil (Upper Amazon).

The wingspan is about 24 mm. The forewings are fuscous with three cloudy dark fuscous lines, the first two nearly straight, the first scarcely oblique, the second rather oblique, the third forming a somewhat curved series of cloudy dots, indented above the middle. The hindwings are grey.
