= Stenoma xanthophaeella =

Scientific classification
- Kingdom: Animalia
- Phylum: Arthropoda
- Class: Insecta
- Order: Lepidoptera
- Family: Depressariidae
- Genus: Stenoma
- Species: S. xanthophaeella

Binomial name
- Stenoma xanthophaeella (Walker, 1864)

Synonyms
- Paepia xanthophaeella Walker, 1864

Species of moth

Stenoma xanthophaeella is a moth in the family Depressariidae. It was described by Francis Walker in 1864. It is found in Amazonas, Brazil.

Adults are ochraceous, the forewings much rounded at the tips, with a large blackish patch extending from the outer part of the interior border nearly to the costa. The hindwings are blackish.
