= Stenoma abductella =

Scientific classification
- Kingdom: Animalia
- Phylum: Arthropoda
- Class: Insecta
- Order: Lepidoptera
- Family: Depressariidae
- Genus: Stenoma
- Species: S. abductella

Binomial name
- Stenoma abductella (Walker, 1864)

Synonyms
- Cryptolechia abductella Walker, 1864

Species of moth

Stenoma abductella is a moth of the family Depressariidae. It is found in Amazonas, Brazil.

Adults are brownish cinereous, with moderately broad wings, the forewings rounded at the tips, irregularly whitish along the costa and with three brown oblique slightly zigzag lines and a submarginal line of brown points. The exterior border is convex but not oblique.
