= Stenoma exempta =

Scientific classification
- Domain: Eukaryota
- Kingdom: Animalia
- Phylum: Arthropoda
- Class: Insecta
- Order: Lepidoptera
- Family: Depressariidae
- Genus: Stenoma
- Species: S. exempta

Binomial name
- Stenoma exempta Meyrick, 1925

Species of moth

Stenoma exempta is a moth in the family Depressariidae. It was described by Edward Meyrick in 1925. It is found in Pará, Brazil.

The wingspan is about 17 mm. The forewings are light glossy grey with a marginal series of black dots around the posterior part of the costa and termen, a slender white marginal streak enclosing these around the apex and upper part of the termen. The hindwings are grey.
