= Stenoma jucunda =

Scientific classification
- Kingdom: Animalia
- Phylum: Arthropoda
- Clade: Pancrustacea
- Class: Insecta
- Order: Lepidoptera
- Family: Depressariidae
- Genus: Stenoma
- Species: S. jucunda

Binomial name
- Stenoma jucunda Meyrick, 1915

Species of moth

Stenoma jucunda is a moth of the family Depressariidae. It is found in Peru.

The wingspan is 18–19 mm. The forewings are light greyish ochreous, the costal edge somewhat deeper or fuscous, around the apex becoming suffused and gradually obsolete. There is a cloudy deeper ochreous spot on the end of the cell. The hindwings are grey.
