= Stenoma receptella =

Scientific classification
- Kingdom: Animalia
- Phylum: Arthropoda
- Class: Insecta
- Order: Lepidoptera
- Family: Depressariidae
- Genus: Stenoma
- Species: S. receptella

Binomial name
- Stenoma receptella (Walker, 1864)

Synonyms
- Cryptolechia receptella Walker, 1864

Species of moth

Stenoma receptella is a moth in the family Depressariidae. It was described by Francis Walker in 1864. It is found in Amazonas, Brazil.

Adults are a pale fawn colour, the forewings rounded at the tips and with the marginal points black and minute. The exterior border is convex, but not oblique. The hindwings are yellowish cinereous.
