= Stenoma sommerella =

Scientific classification
- Kingdom: Animalia
- Phylum: Arthropoda
- Clade: Pancrustacea
- Class: Insecta
- Order: Lepidoptera
- Family: Depressariidae
- Genus: Stenoma
- Species: S. sommerella

Binomial name
- Stenoma sommerella (Zeller, 1877)

Synonyms
- Cryptolechia sommerella Zeller, 1877; Stenoma nymphotima Meyrick, 1931; Stenoma xylograpta Meyrick, 1931

Species of moth

Stenoma sommerella is a moth in the family Depressariidae. It was described by Philipp Christoph Zeller in 1877. It is found in Central America and Brazil.
