= Stenoma lapidea =

Scientific classification
- Domain: Eukaryota
- Kingdom: Animalia
- Phylum: Arthropoda
- Class: Insecta
- Order: Lepidoptera
- Family: Depressariidae
- Genus: Stenoma
- Species: S. lapidea

Binomial name
- Stenoma lapidea Meyrick, 1916

Species of moth

Stenoma lapidea is a moth of the family Depressariidae. It is found in French Guiana.

The wingspan is about 38 mm. The forewings are pale glossy grey, with a faint greenish-violet tinge and the costal edge white and with a black basal dot. The plical and second discal stigmata are rather small, elongate and black. The hindwings are pale grey.
