= Stenoma peridesma =

Scientific classification
- Domain: Eukaryota
- Kingdom: Animalia
- Phylum: Arthropoda
- Class: Insecta
- Order: Lepidoptera
- Family: Depressariidae
- Genus: Stenoma
- Species: S. peridesma

Binomial name
- Stenoma peridesma Meyrick, 1925

Species of moth

Stenoma peridesma is a moth of the family Depressariidae. It is found in Amazonas, Brazil.

The wingspan is about 13 mm. The forewings are light brownish ochreous speckled grey with the costal and apical edge suffused ferruginous, the base of the costa grey. The second discal stigma is small and dark grey. The hindwings are grey.
