= Stenoma sematopa =

Scientific classification
- Domain: Eukaryota
- Kingdom: Animalia
- Phylum: Arthropoda
- Class: Insecta
- Order: Lepidoptera
- Family: Depressariidae
- Genus: Stenoma
- Species: S. sematopa

Binomial name
- Stenoma sematopa Meyrick, 1915

Species of moth

Stenoma sematopa is a moth of the family Depressariidae. It is found in Guyana.

The wingspan is 15–16 mm. The forewings are light glossy grey, with a faint violet tinge and with the extreme costal edge whitish. There are short very fine ochreous-whitish lines from the base in the middle and on the fold. The hindwings are grey.
