= Stenoma inardescens =

Scientific classification
- Domain: Eukaryota
- Kingdom: Animalia
- Phylum: Arthropoda
- Class: Insecta
- Order: Lepidoptera
- Family: Depressariidae
- Genus: Stenoma
- Species: S. inardescens

Binomial name
- Stenoma inardescens Meyrick, 1925

Species of moth

Stenoma inardescens is a moth of the family Depressariidae. It is found in Amazonas, Brazil.

The wingspan is 22–23 mm. The forewings are violet fuscous with a transverse dark brown spot on the end of the cell, sometimes broken into two, the upper part centred brownish ochreous. The hindwings are dark grey.
