= Stenoma hypocirrha =

Scientific classification
- Domain: Eukaryota
- Kingdom: Animalia
- Phylum: Arthropoda
- Class: Insecta
- Order: Lepidoptera
- Family: Depressariidae
- Genus: Stenoma
- Species: S. hypocirrha

Binomial name
- Stenoma hypocirrha Meyrick, 1930

Species of moth

Stenoma hypocirrha is a moth in the family Depressariidae. It was described by Edward Meyrick in 1930. It is found in Brazil.

The wingspan is about 35 mm. The forewings are white and the hindwings are pale whitish ochreous. The forewings and hindwings are whitish yellowish beneath.
