= Stenoma simulatrix =

Scientific classification
- Kingdom: Animalia
- Phylum: Arthropoda
- Class: Insecta
- Order: Lepidoptera
- Family: Depressariidae
- Genus: Stenoma
- Species: S. simulatrix

Binomial name
- Stenoma simulatrix Meyrick, 1914

Species of moth

Stenoma simulatrix is a moth in the family Depressariidae. It was described by Edward Meyrick in 1914. It is found in South Africa.

The wingspan is 20–21 mm. The forewings are light ochreous grey with a narrow suffused ochreous-yellow costal streak throughout. The hindwings are grey.
