= Stenoma modicola =

Scientific classification
- Kingdom: Animalia
- Phylum: Arthropoda
- Class: Insecta
- Order: Lepidoptera
- Family: Depressariidae
- Genus: Stenoma
- Species: S. modicola

Binomial name
- Stenoma modicola Meyrick, 1911

Species of moth

Stenoma modicola is a moth in the family Depressariidae. It was described by Edward Meyrick in 1911. It is found in the Democratic Republic of the Congo (Katanga), South Africa and Tanzania.

The wingspan is about 24 mm. The forewings are deep ochreous yellow and the hindwings are rather dark grey.
