= Stenoma auricoma =

Scientific classification
- Domain: Eukaryota
- Kingdom: Animalia
- Phylum: Arthropoda
- Class: Insecta
- Order: Lepidoptera
- Family: Depressariidae
- Genus: Stenoma
- Species: S. auricoma

Binomial name
- Stenoma auricoma Meyrick, 1930

Species of moth

Stenoma auricoma is a moth in the family Depressariidae. It was described by Edward Meyrick in 1930. It is found in Brazil.

The wingspan is about 18 mm. The forewings are greyish violet with the costal edge white. The hindwings are rather dark grey.
