= Stenoma empyrota =

Scientific classification
- Domain: Eukaryota
- Kingdom: Animalia
- Phylum: Arthropoda
- Class: Insecta
- Order: Lepidoptera
- Family: Depressariidae
- Genus: Stenoma
- Species: S. empyrota

Binomial name
- Stenoma empyrota Meyrick, 1915

Synonyms
- Cryptolechia tortricella Staudinger, 1899 (preocc. Walker, 1864)

Species of moth

Stenoma empyrota is a moth in the family Depressariidae. It was described by Edward Meyrick in 1915. It is found in Guyana.
