= Stenoma sciogama =

Scientific classification
- Domain: Eukaryota
- Kingdom: Animalia
- Phylum: Arthropoda
- Class: Insecta
- Order: Lepidoptera
- Family: Depressariidae
- Genus: Stenoma
- Species: S. sciogama

Binomial name
- Stenoma sciogama Meyrick, 1930

Species of moth

Stenoma sciogama is a moth in the family Depressariidae. It was described by Edward Meyrick in 1930. It is found in Brazil (Bahia).

The wingspan is 18–20 mm for males and 22–23 mm for females.
