= Stenoma compsocoma =

Scientific classification
- Kingdom: Animalia
- Phylum: Arthropoda
- Class: Insecta
- Order: Lepidoptera
- Family: Depressariidae
- Genus: Stenoma
- Species: S. compsocoma

Binomial name
- Stenoma compsocoma Meyrick, 1930

Species of moth

Stenoma compsocoma is a moth in the family Depressariidae. It was described by Edward Meyrick in 1930. It is found in Pará, Brazil.

The wingspan is 14–16 mm. The forewings are light violet grey. The hindwings are grey.
