= Stenoma funerana =

Scientific classification
- Domain: Eukaryota
- Kingdom: Animalia
- Phylum: Arthropoda
- Class: Insecta
- Order: Lepidoptera
- Family: Depressariidae
- Genus: Stenoma
- Species: S. funerana

Binomial name
- Stenoma funerana (Sepp, [1847])

Synonyms
- Phalaena (Tortrices) funerana Sepp, [1847]

Species of moth

Stenoma funerana is a moth in the family Depressariidae. It was described by Jan Sepp in 1847. It is found in the Guianas.
