= Stenoma latitans =

Scientific classification
- Kingdom: Animalia
- Phylum: Arthropoda
- Clade: Pancrustacea
- Class: Insecta
- Order: Lepidoptera
- Family: Depressariidae
- Genus: Stenoma
- Species: S. latitans

Binomial name
- Stenoma latitans (Dognin, 1905)

Synonyms
- Cryptolechia latitans Dognin, 1905

Species of moth

Stenoma latitans is a moth in the family Depressariidae. It was described by Paul Dognin in 1905. It is found in São Paulo, Brazil.
