= Stenoma macroptycha =

Scientific classification
- Domain: Eukaryota
- Kingdom: Animalia
- Phylum: Arthropoda
- Class: Insecta
- Order: Lepidoptera
- Family: Depressariidae
- Genus: Stenoma
- Species: S. macroptycha

Binomial name
- Stenoma macroptycha Meyrick, 1930

Synonyms
- Stenoma spermidias Meyrick, 1932

Species of moth

Stenoma macroptycha is a moth in the family Depressariidae. It was described by Edward Meyrick in 1930. It is found in Panama.
