= Stenoma callicoma =

Scientific classification
- Domain: Eukaryota
- Kingdom: Animalia
- Phylum: Arthropoda
- Class: Insecta
- Order: Lepidoptera
- Family: Depressariidae
- Genus: Stenoma
- Species: S. callicoma

Binomial name
- Stenoma callicoma Meyrick, 1916

Species of moth

Stenoma callicoma is a moth of the family Depressariidae. It is found in French Guiana.

The wingspan is 20–22 mm. The forewings are whitish-violet grey and the hindwings are grey.
