= Stenoma hyalocryptis =

Scientific classification
- Domain: Eukaryota
- Kingdom: Animalia
- Phylum: Arthropoda
- Class: Insecta
- Order: Lepidoptera
- Family: Depressariidae
- Genus: Stenoma
- Species: S. hyalocryptis

Binomial name
- Stenoma hyalocryptis Meyrick, 1930

Species of moth

Stenoma hyalocryptis is a moth in the family Depressariidae. It was described by Edward Meyrick in 1930. It is found in Pará, Brazil.
