= Stenoma ybyrajubu =

Scientific classification
- Domain: Eukaryota
- Kingdom: Animalia
- Phylum: Arthropoda
- Class: Insecta
- Order: Lepidoptera
- Family: Depressariidae
- Genus: Stenoma
- Species: S. ybyrajubu

Binomial name
- Stenoma ybyrajubu Becker, 1971

Species of moth

Stenoma ybyrajubu is a moth in the family Depressariidae. It was described by Vitor O. Becker in 1971. It is found in Brazil.
