= Stenoma ptychobathra =

Scientific classification
- Kingdom: Animalia
- Phylum: Arthropoda
- Clade: Pancrustacea
- Class: Insecta
- Order: Lepidoptera
- Family: Depressariidae
- Genus: Stenoma
- Species: S. ptychobathra

Binomial name
- Stenoma ptychobathra Meyrick, 1930

Species of moth

Stenoma ptychobathra is a moth in the family Depressariidae. It was described by Edward Meyrick in 1930. It is found in Brazil.
