= Stenoma myrrhinopa =

Scientific classification
- Kingdom: Animalia
- Phylum: Arthropoda
- Class: Insecta
- Order: Lepidoptera
- Family: Depressariidae
- Genus: Stenoma
- Species: S. myrrhinopa

Binomial name
- Stenoma myrrhinopa Meyrick, 1932

Species of moth

Stenoma myrrhinopa is a moth in the family Depressariidae. It was described by Edward Meyrick in 1932. It is found in Brazil and Guatemala.
