= Stenoma psalmographa =

Scientific classification
- Domain: Eukaryota
- Kingdom: Animalia
- Phylum: Arthropoda
- Class: Insecta
- Order: Lepidoptera
- Family: Depressariidae
- Genus: Stenoma
- Species: S. psalmographa

Binomial name
- Stenoma psalmographa Meyrick, 1931

Species of moth

Stenoma psalmographa is a moth in the family Depressariidae. It was described by Edward Meyrick in 1931. It is found in Brazil.
