= Stenoma eumenodora =

Scientific classification
- Kingdom: Animalia
- Phylum: Arthropoda
- Class: Insecta
- Order: Lepidoptera
- Family: Depressariidae
- Genus: Stenoma
- Species: S. eumenodora

Binomial name
- Stenoma eumenodora Meyrick, 1937

Species of moth

Stenoma eumenodora is a moth in the family Depressariidae. It was described by Edward Meyrick in 1937. It is found in Argentina.
