= Stenoma phalacropa =

Scientific classification
- Kingdom: Animalia
- Phylum: Arthropoda
- Class: Insecta
- Order: Lepidoptera
- Family: Depressariidae
- Genus: Stenoma
- Species: S. phalacropa

Binomial name
- Stenoma phalacropa Meyrick, 1932

Species of moth

Stenoma phalacropa is a moth in the family Depressariidae. It was described by Edward Meyrick in 1932. It is found in Panama.
