= Salmoni =

Salmoni (Σαλμώνη) may refer to:

- Salmoni, Elis, a village in the municipality of Pyrgos, Elis regional unit

== People ==
- Salmoni (cricketer) (fl. 1830s), English cricketer
- Dave Salmoni (born 1975), Canadian animal trainer, entertainer and television producer
- Rubino Romeo Salmonì (1920-2011), Italian writer

== See also ==
- Anticoreura salmoni, an insect native to Colombia
- Beddomeia salmonis, a species of very small freshwater snail
- Brachygalba salmoni, a bird species known as the dusky-backed jacamar
- Chrysothlypis salmoni, a bird species known as the scarlet-and-white tanager
- Lepeophtheirus salmonis, a copepod known as the salmon louse
- Phaio salmoni, a moth of the family Arctiidae
