= Argentala subcoerulea =

Scientific classification
- Kingdom: Animalia
- Phylum: Arthropoda
- Clade: Pancrustacea
- Class: Insecta
- Order: Lepidoptera
- Superfamily: Noctuoidea
- Family: Notodontidae
- Genus: Argentala
- Species: A. subcoerulea

Binomial name
- Argentala subcoerulea (Warren, 1901)

Synonyms
- Tithraustes subcoerulea Warren, 1901

Species of moth

Argentala subcoerulea is a moth of the family Notodontidae first described by William Warren in 1901. It is found on the Pacific versant of the Cordillera Central from Guanacaste in Costa Rica south to Chiriquí in Panama. It inhabits cloud forests and is found at elevations of 1,050–1,400 m (3,440–4,590 ft). It is the type species of the genus Argentala.

== Taxonomy ==
Argentala subcoerulea was formally described by the English entomologist William Warren in 1901 as Tithraustes subcoerulea. It was subsequently assigned to the genus Momonipta in 1918, with that genus being synonymized with Stenoplastis in 1925. It is the type species of the genus Argentala, which was erected by the American entomologist John S. Miller in 2009. He also noted that a specimen of a moth from northwestern Colombia which had been considered to represent A. subcoerulea instead represented an undescribed species. A. subcoerulea is sister to A. mesitana.

== Distribution and habitat ==
Argentala subcoerulea is native to Central America, where it is found on the Pacific versant of the Cordillera Central from Guanacaste in Costa Rica south to Chiriquí in Panama. It was formerly thought to occur in Colombia based on a single female specimen, but that specimen was later identified as an undescribed species. Like other species in its genus, it inhabits cloud forests and is found at elevations of 1,050–1,400 m (3,440–4,590 ft).
