= Argentala =

Scientific classification
- Kingdom: Animalia
- Phylum: Arthropoda
- Clade: Pancrustacea
- Class: Insecta
- Order: Lepidoptera
- Superfamily: Noctuoidea
- Family: Notodontidae
- Tribe: Dioptini
- Genus: Argentala; J.S. Miller, 2009

Genus of moths

Argentala is a genus of moths of the family Notodontidae. The genus contains six species of moths that are native to Central and South America, being found from Guanacaste in Costa Rica south to southern Ecuador. Moths in this genus only inhabit cloud forests. They have chocolate to blackish-brown forewings and darker brown hindwings. The underside of the hindwing is largely silvery-white in all species, a characteristic that lends the genus its name. The length of the forewings is 12.0–16.0 mm for males and 14.0–16.5 mm for females.

== Taxonomy ==
The genus Argentala was erected by the American entomologist John S. Miller in 2009. The genus name is derived from the Latin words meaning "silvery wing", in reference to the silvery-white underside of the hindwings in every species in the genus. The type species of the genus is Argentala subcoerulea, originally described as Tithraustes subcoerulea by the English entomologist William Warren in 1901. Alongside A. subcoerulea, Miller placed five other species in the genus, two of which were described in the same paper erecting the genus. He also noted that there was an undescribed species that belonged to Argentala native to Ecuador.

The genus is most closely related to Pikroprion.

== Description ==
Argentala moths have chocolate to blackish-brown forewings. The hindwing is even darker brown than the forewing, with a white blotch at the center in some species. The underside of the hindwing is largely silvery-white in all species. The length of the forewings is 12.0–16.0 mm for males and 14.0–16.5 mm for females.

== Distribution and habitat ==
The genus is a Neotropical endemic, being found from southern Ecuador north to Maracay, Venezuela and Guanacaste, Costa Rica. The currently known distribution is probably an underestimate due to the how poorly-studied this genus is; future studies may find its range extending to Peru and Bolivia. It only inhabits cloud forests.

== Species ==
The genus contains of the following species:

- Argentala argoptera Miller, 2008
- Argentala brehmi Miller, 2008
- Argentala mesitana (Dognin, 1917)
- Argentala subalba (Walker, 1859)
- Argentala subcaesia (Prout, 1918)
- Argentala subcoerulea (Warren, 1901)
