= Xenomigia disciplaga =

Scientific classification
- Kingdom: Animalia
- Phylum: Arthropoda
- Clade: Pancrustacea
- Class: Insecta
- Order: Lepidoptera
- Superfamily: Noctuoidea
- Family: Notodontidae
- Genus: Xenomigia
- Species: X. disciplaga

Binomial name
- Xenomigia disciplaga Hering, 1926

Species of moth

"Xenomigia" disciplaga is a moth of the family Notodontidae. It is found in Colombia.

== Taxonomy ==
The species probably does not belong in Xenomigia, but has not been placed in another genus yet. The species is only known from the female type and is impossible to place in an existing Dioptinae genus.
