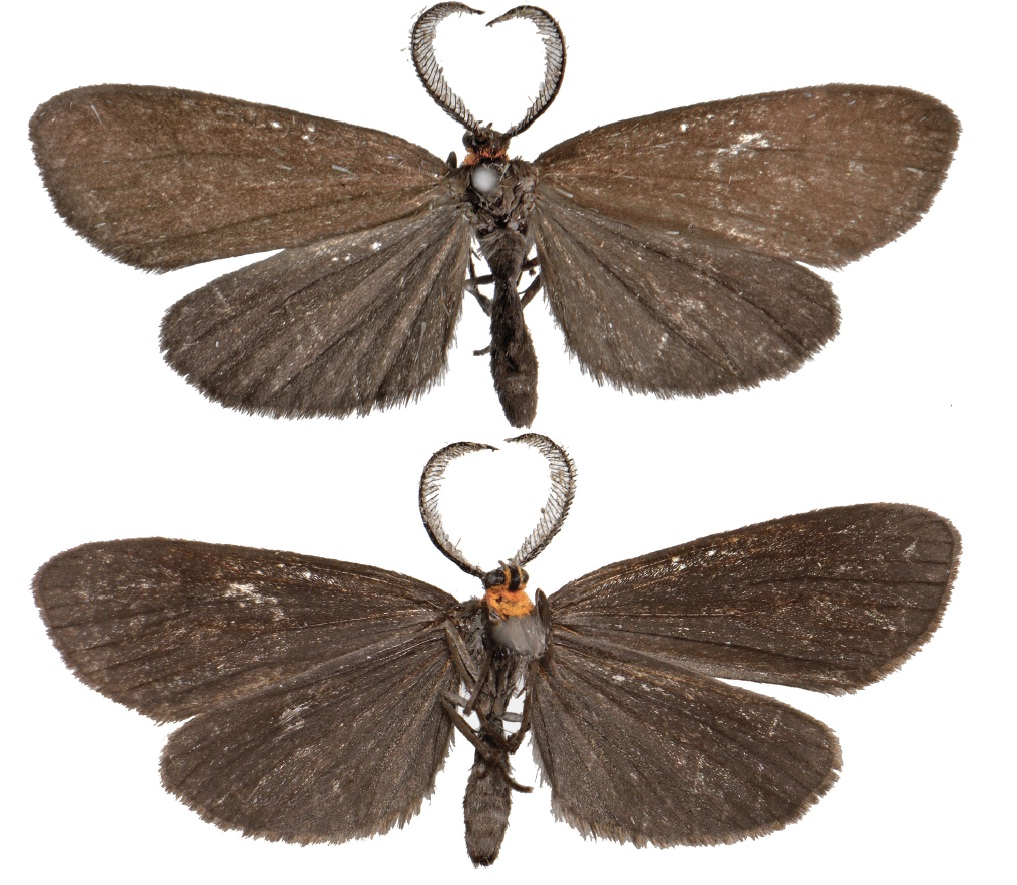
- Dorsal and ventral view

Scientific classification
- Kingdom: Animalia
- Phylum: Arthropoda
- Clade: Pancrustacea
- Class: Insecta
- Order: Lepidoptera
- Superfamily: Noctuoidea
- Family: Notodontidae
- Tribe: Dioptini
- Genus: Eremonidiopsis; Aguila, 2013
- Species: E. aggregata

Binomial name
- Eremonidiopsis aggregata Aguila, 2013

= Eremonidiopsis =

Genus of moths

Eremonidiopsis is a genus of moths of the family Notodontidae. It consists of only one species, Eremonidiopsis aggregata, which is known from the north-eastern Cuban mountain range Nipe–Sagua–Baracoa in Holguín province, Cuba. The habitat consists of lowland rainforests and sclerophyll rainforests.

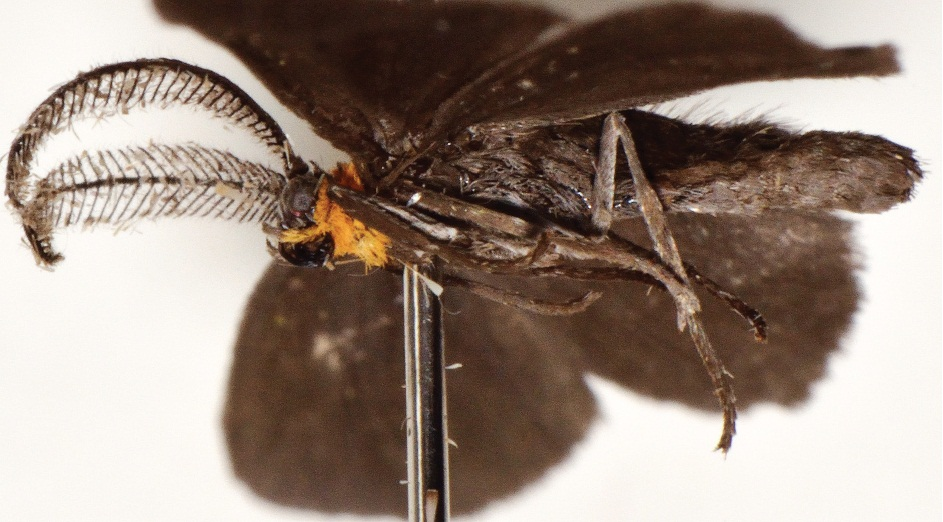
Lateral view

The length of the forewings is 12–12.7 mm. The forewings are uniformly brown with a glossy dorsal surface. The ventral surface is uniformly brownish grey. The hindwings are uniformly dark brownish grey

== Etymology ==
The generic name is derived from the name of its Hispaniolan relative Eremonidia. The suffix –opsis refers to the resemblance of the Cuban genus to the Hispaniolan one. The species name is derived from Latin gregis (meaning flock or group) and the suffix atus (meaning having the nature of) and refers to the aggregation of individuals observed during both collecting events.
