= Podarkes =

Podarkes and Podarces (Ancient Greek: Ποδάρκης) (masculine), Podarke and Podarce (Ancient Greek: Ποδάρκη) (femine), meaning swift-footed, may refer to:

== Greek Mythology ==
- Podarces, a hero in Homer's Iliad
- Podarkes, the original name of Priam, king of Troy; see Laomedon of Troy § Siege of Heracles
- Podarkes, an epithet of Achilles
- Podarke, a harpy
- Podarke, one of the Danaïdes

== Other ==
- 13062 Podarkes, an asteroid which belong to the Jupiter trojan
- Podarces pylzowi, a species of lizard
- Aphanocrex podarces, an extinct flightless rail from Saint Helena
- Phintia podarce, a moth of the family Notodontidae
- Agriades podarce, a butterfly in the family Lycaenidae
- Podarke Ehlers, an annelid taxa
- Scalmicauda podarce, a moth in genus Scalmicauda
