= X. concinna =

X. concinna may refer to:

- Xanthoria concinna, a lichenized fungus
- Xenomigia concinna, a Colombian moth
