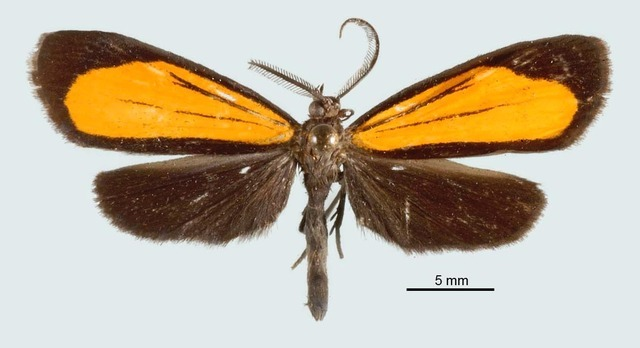

Scientific classification
- Kingdom: Animalia
- Phylum: Arthropoda
- Clade: Pancrustacea
- Class: Insecta
- Order: Lepidoptera
- Superfamily: Noctuoidea
- Family: Notodontidae
- Genus: Notascea
- Species: N. straba

Binomial name
- Notascea straba Miller, 2008

= Notascea straba =

Species of moth

Notascea straba is a moth of the family Notodontidae. It is known only from Cuzco region in Peru.
