= Scoturopsis flaviplaga =

Scientific classification
- Kingdom: Animalia
- Phylum: Arthropoda
- Clade: Pancrustacea
- Class: Insecta
- Order: Lepidoptera
- Superfamily: Noctuoidea
- Family: Notodontidae
- Genus: Scoturopsis
- Species: S. flaviplaga

Binomial name
- Scoturopsis flaviplaga (Dognin, 1911)

Synonyms
- Scotura flaviplaga Dognin, 1911

Species of moth

Scoturopsis flaviplaga is a moth of the family Notodontidae. It is found in the Central Cordillera of Colombia in the area of Tolima.
