= Sagittala =

Scientific classification
- Kingdom: Animalia
- Phylum: Arthropoda
- Clade: Pancrustacea
- Class: Insecta
- Order: Lepidoptera
- Superfamily: Noctuoidea
- Family: Notodontidae
- Tribe: Dioptini
- Genus: Sagittala; J. S. Miller, 2009
- Species: S. peba

Binomial name
- Sagittala peba (Druce, 1897)

Synonyms
- Ephialtias peba Druce, 1897

Genus of moths

Sagittala is a genus of moths of the family Notodontidae. It consists of only one species, Sagittala peba, which is found in Panama and Costa Rica.
