= Stenoplastis flavinigra =

Scientific classification
- Kingdom: Animalia
- Phylum: Arthropoda
- Clade: Pancrustacea
- Class: Insecta
- Order: Lepidoptera
- Superfamily: Noctuoidea
- Family: Notodontidae
- Genus: Stenoplastis
- Species: S. flavinigra

Binomial name
- Stenoplastis flavinigra (Dognin, 1910)

Synonyms
- Momonipta flavinigra Dognin, 1910

Species of moth

Stenoplastis flavinigra is a moth of the family Notodontidae. It is found from Choco in north-western Colombia south to Pichincha in Ecuador. It occurs at low to mid elevations between 100 and 1,000 meters.

It is the smallest species in the genus Stenoplastis.
