= Xenomigia noctipenna =

Scientific classification
- Kingdom: Animalia
- Phylum: Arthropoda
- Clade: Pancrustacea
- Class: Insecta
- Order: Lepidoptera
- Superfamily: Noctuoidea
- Family: Notodontidae
- Genus: Xenomigia
- Species: X. noctipenna

Binomial name
- Xenomigia noctipenna Miller, 2011

Species of moth

Xenomigia noctipenna is a moth of the family Notodontidae. It is found in north-eastern Ecuador.

The length of the forewings is 15.5-17.5 mm.

The larvae have been reared on Chusquea cf. scandens.
