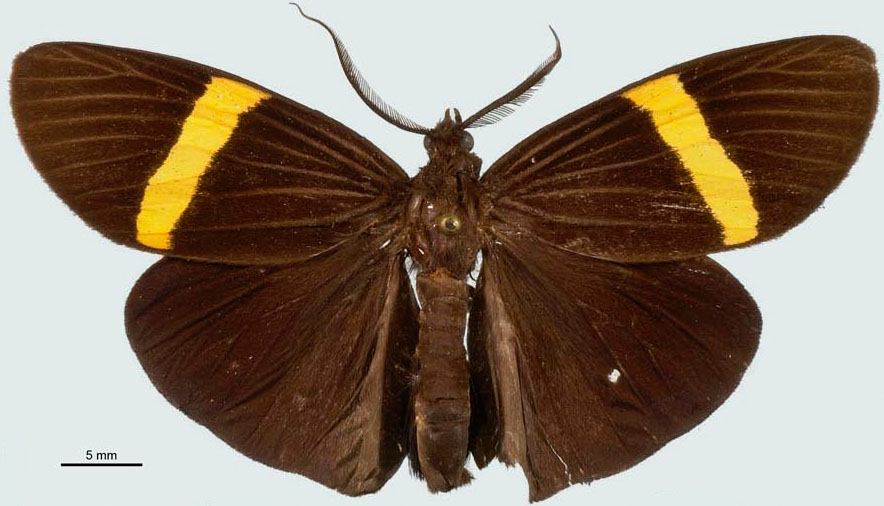
- Phavaraea dilatata

Scientific classification
- Kingdom: Animalia
- Phylum: Arthropoda
- Clade: Pancrustacea
- Class: Insecta
- Order: Lepidoptera
- Superfamily: Noctuoidea
- Family: Notodontidae
- Tribe: Josiini
- Genus: Phavaraea; Walker, 1854

Synonyms
- Sagaris Walker, 1854; Milodora Boisduval, 1870; Scedros Walker, 1854; Apocinesia Bryk, 1930

= Phavaraea =

Genus of moths

Phavaraea is a genus of moths of the family Notodontidae erected by Francis Walker in 1854. It consists of the following species:

- Phavaraea dilatata (Walker, 1854)
- Phavaraea poliana (Druce, 1893)
- Phavaraea rectangularis (Toulgoët & Navatte, 1997)
- Phavaraea rejecta (Geyer, 1832)
