= Argentala argoptera =

Scientific classification
- Kingdom: Animalia
- Phylum: Arthropoda
- Clade: Pancrustacea
- Class: Insecta
- Order: Lepidoptera
- Superfamily: Noctuoidea
- Family: Notodontidae
- Genus: Argentala
- Species: A. argoptera

Binomial name
- Argentala argoptera Miller, 2008

Species of moth

Argentala argoptera is a moth of the family Notodontidae first described by James S. Miller in 2008. The length of the forewings is 15–16 mm for males. The forewing and hindwing are chocolate brown above, with extensively silvery-white undersides that the species is named after. It is currently only known from Ecuador, but almost certainly also occurs in southwestern Colombia. It inhabits cloud forests at elevations of 1,200–2,600 m (3,900–8,500 ft).

== Taxonomy ==
Argentala argoptera was formally described by the American entomologist James S. Miller in 2008 based on a male collected from Cotopaxi in Ecuador. Its specific epithet is derived from the Greek words meaning "white-winged", in reference to the silvery-white undersides to its wings, which are the most extensive in the genus.

== Description ==
The length of the forewings is 15–16 mm for males. The forewing is a deep chocolate-brown, with an orange-yellow lining to the veins. The underside of the forewing is silvery-white for three-fourths of the area closest to the base, with the remainder of the wing being a pale chocolate brown. The hindwing is also dark chocolate brown above, but has an entirely silvery-white underside marked with a broad chocolate-brown stripe near the tip.

== Distribution and habitat ==
Argentala argoptera is currently only known from Ecuador, where it inhabits the western versant of the Andes in Cotopaxi, Esmeraldas, and Imbabura. It is endemic to a fairly small area, but almost certainly also occurs in southwestern Colombia. It inhabits cloud forests at elevations of 1,200–2,600 m (3,900–8,500 ft).
