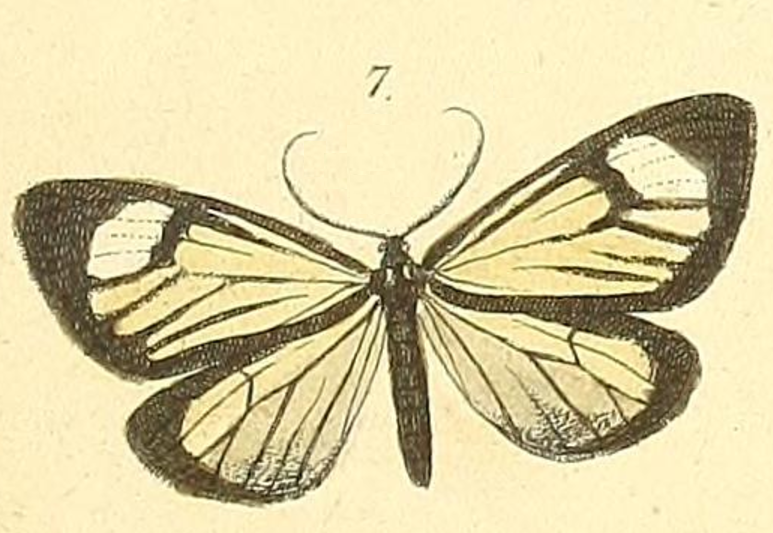
- Monocreagra pheloides

Scientific classification
- Kingdom: Animalia
- Phylum: Arthropoda
- Clade: Pancrustacea
- Class: Insecta
- Order: Lepidoptera
- Superfamily: Noctuoidea
- Family: Notodontidae
- Subfamily: Dioptinae
- Tribe: Dioptini
- Genus: Monocreagra; Felder, 1874

Synonyms
- Euforbesia Kiriakoff, 1950

= Monocreagra =

Genus of moths

Monocreagra is a genus of moths of the family Notodontidae. It consists of the following species:

- Monocreagra orthyades Druce, 1893
- Monocreagra pheloides C. and R. Felder, 1874
- Monocreagra unimacula (Warren, 1897)
