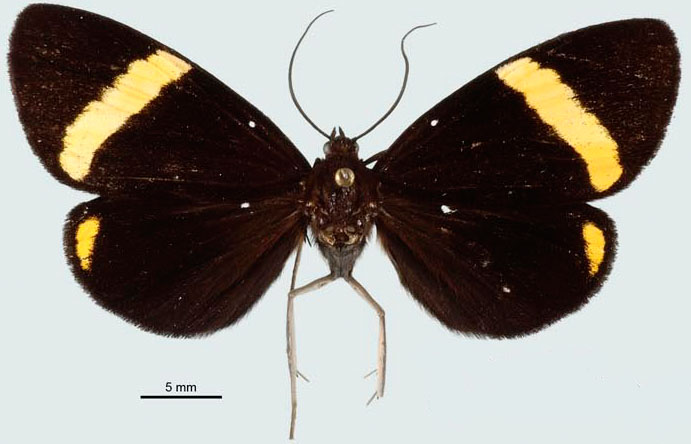
- Female
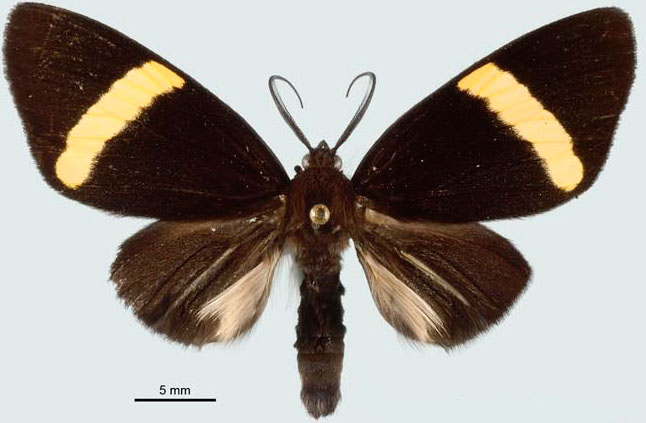
- Male

Scientific classification
- Kingdom: Animalia
- Phylum: Arthropoda
- Clade: Pancrustacea
- Class: Insecta
- Order: Lepidoptera
- Superfamily: Noctuoidea
- Family: Notodontidae
- Genus: Polyptychia
- Species: P. hermieri

Binomial name
- Polyptychia hermieri J.S. Miller, 2009

= Polyptychia hermieri =

Species of moth

Polyptychia hermieri is a moth of the family Notodontidae. It is found in French Guiana, Trinidad and the lower Amazon basin.

Larvae have been recorded on Passiflora candida.
