= Brachyglene superbior =

Scientific classification
- Kingdom: Animalia
- Phylum: Arthropoda
- Clade: Pancrustacea
- Class: Insecta
- Order: Lepidoptera
- Superfamily: Noctuoidea
- Family: Notodontidae
- Genus: Brachyglene
- Species: B. superbior

Binomial name
- Brachyglene superbior (Strand, 1912)

Synonyms
- Ephialtias superbior Strand, 1912

Species of moth

"Brachyglene" superbior is a moth of the family Notodontidae first described by Embrik Strand in 1912. It is found in Ecuador.

== Taxonomy ==
The species does not belong in Brachyglene and has even been identified as an Arctiidae species, but has not been placed in another genus yet.
