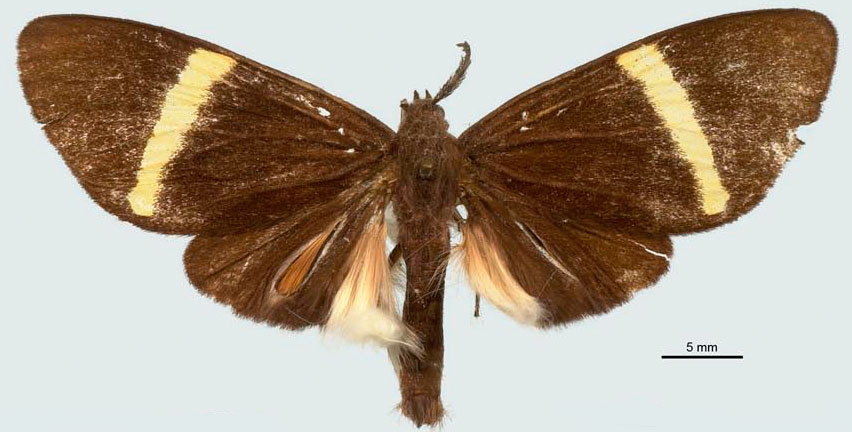

Scientific classification
- Kingdom: Animalia
- Phylum: Arthropoda
- Clade: Pancrustacea
- Class: Insecta
- Order: Lepidoptera
- Superfamily: Noctuoidea
- Family: Notodontidae
- Genus: Polyptychia
- Species: P. fasciculosa

Binomial name
- Polyptychia fasciculosa C. Felder & R. Felder, 1874

= Polyptychia fasciculosa =

Species of moth

Polyptychia fasciculosa is a moth of the family Notodontidae first described by Cajetan and Rudolf Felder in 1874. It is found in the Guiana Shield and in Amazonia in South America, including Colombia.

Larvae feed on Passiflora species.
