= Phanoptis donahuei =

Scientific classification
- Kingdom: Animalia
- Phylum: Arthropoda
- Clade: Pancrustacea
- Class: Insecta
- Order: Lepidoptera
- Superfamily: Noctuoidea
- Family: Notodontidae
- Genus: Phanoptis
- Species: P. donahuei

Binomial name
- Phanoptis donahuei Miller, 2008

Species of moth

Phanoptis donahuei is a moth of the family Notodontidae. It is found in southern Mexico. The length of the forewings is 20–21.5 mm for males and 22.5–24 mm for females. The forewing is chocolate or black-brown above and has a glossy violet wash. The hindwing is largely transparent, except for a dark brown border around the edges and the brown veins. Phanoptis donahuei is known from Mexico and Guatemala. It inhabits lowlands at elevations of 100–500 m (330–1,640 ft).

== Taxonomy ==
Phanoptis donahuei was formally described by the American entomologist James S. Miller in 2008 based on a male collected from the state of Veracruz in Mexico. The species is named after Julian P. Donahue, curator emeritus of the entomology department at the Natural History Museum of Los Angeles County.

== Description ==
The length of the forewings is 20–21.5 mm for males and 22.5–24 mm for females. The forewing is chocolate or black-brown above and has a glossy violet wash, with a concolorous underside. The hindwing is largely transparent, except for a dark brown border around the edges and the brown veins. The underside is also similarly colored.

== Distribution and habitat ==
Phanoptis donahuei is endemic to Mexico and Guatemala, where it inhabits lowlands. It has been recorded from three locations in Mexico, located in Chiapas near the Guatemalan border and Catemaco and Dos Amates in Veracruz, and one location in Guatemala, Quiriguá near the Honduras border. It is known from elevations of 200–500 m (660–1,640 ft) in Mexico and 100 m (330 ft) in Guatemala. This moths probably feeds on Rinorea as a caterpillar.
