= Momonipta onorei =

Scientific classification
- Kingdom: Animalia
- Phylum: Arthropoda
- Clade: Pancrustacea
- Class: Insecta
- Order: Lepidoptera
- Superfamily: Noctuoidea
- Family: Notodontidae
- Genus: Momonipta
- Species: M. onorei

Binomial name
- Momonipta onorei Miller, 2008

Species of moth

Momonipta onorei is a moth of the family Notodontidae first described by James S. Miller in 2008. It is found in Ecuador (the provinces of Esmeraldas, Imbabura and Pichincha).

The length of the forewings is 18.5–20 mm for males and 21.5–23 mm for females.

== Etymology ==
The species is named in honor of Giovanni Onore.
