= Phaio bacchans =

Scientific classification
- Kingdom: Animalia
- Phylum: Arthropoda
- Clade: Pancrustacea
- Class: Insecta
- Order: Lepidoptera
- Superfamily: Noctuoidea
- Family: Erebidae
- Subfamily: Arctiinae
- Genus: Phaio
- Species: P. bacchans

Binomial name
- Phaio bacchans (Schaus, 1892)

Synonyms
- Eupyra bacchans Schaus, 1892

Species of moth

Phaio bacchans is a moth of the subfamily Arctiinae. It was described by Schaus in 1892. It is found in Peru.
