= Dolophrosyne mirax =

Scientific classification
- Kingdom: Animalia
- Phylum: Arthropoda
- Clade: Pancrustacea
- Class: Insecta
- Order: Lepidoptera
- Superfamily: Noctuoidea
- Family: Notodontidae
- Genus: Dolophrosyne
- Species: D. mirax

Binomial name
- Dolophrosyne mirax L. B. Prout, 1918

Synonyms
- Scoturopsis uniformis Hering, 1925

Species of moth

Dolophrosyne mirax is a moth of the family Notodontidae first described by Louis Beethoven Prout in 1918. It is found in Peru and Bolivia.
