= Isostyla ithomeina =

Scientific classification
- Kingdom: Animalia
- Phylum: Arthropoda
- Clade: Pancrustacea
- Class: Insecta
- Order: Lepidoptera
- Superfamily: Noctuoidea
- Family: Notodontidae
- Genus: Isostyla
- Species: I. ithomeina

Binomial name
- Isostyla ithomeina (Butler, 1872)

Synonyms
- Dioptis ithomeina Butler, 1872; Dioptis erycinoides C. Felder & R. Felder, 1874

Species of moth

Isostyla ithomeina is a moth of the family Notodontidae first described by Arthur Gardiner Butler in 1872. It is found in Panama and Costa Rica.

Larvae have been reared on palms of the genus Asterogyne.
