= Argentala subcaesia =

Scientific classification
- Kingdom: Animalia
- Phylum: Arthropoda
- Clade: Pancrustacea
- Class: Insecta
- Order: Lepidoptera
- Superfamily: Noctuoidea
- Family: Notodontidae
- Genus: Argentala
- Species: A. subcaesia

Binomial name
- Argentala subcaesia (L. B. Prout, 1918)

Synonyms
- Momonipta subcaesia Prout, 1918; Scotura subcoerulea Dognin, 1909

Species of moth

Argentala subcaesia is a moth of the family Notodontidae first described by Louis Beethoven Prout in 1918. It is found in Colombia.
