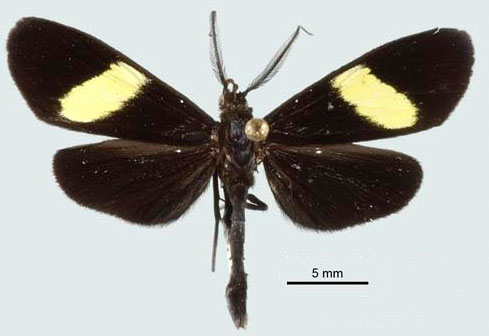
- Phintia broweri

Scientific classification
- Kingdom: Animalia
- Phylum: Arthropoda
- Clade: Pancrustacea
- Class: Insecta
- Order: Lepidoptera
- Superfamily: Noctuoidea
- Family: Notodontidae
- Tribe: Josiini
- Genus: Phintia; Walker, 1854

= Phintia =

Genus of moths

Phintia is a genus of moths of the family Notodontidae first described by Francis Walker in 1854. It consists of the following species:

- Phintia broweri J. S. Miller, 2009
- Phintia podarce Walker, 1854
