= Xenomigia monticolata =

Scientific classification
- Kingdom: Animalia
- Phylum: Arthropoda
- Clade: Pancrustacea
- Class: Insecta
- Order: Lepidoptera
- Superfamily: Noctuoidea
- Family: Notodontidae
- Genus: Xenomigia
- Species: X. monticolata

Binomial name
- Xenomigia monticolata (Maassen, 1890)

Synonyms
- Lignyoptera monticolata Maassen, 1890

Species of moth

Xenomigia monticolata is a moth of the family Notodontidae. It is found in Colombia and Ecuador.
