= Phaio albicincta =

Scientific classification
- Kingdom: Animalia
- Phylum: Arthropoda
- Clade: Pancrustacea
- Class: Insecta
- Order: Lepidoptera
- Superfamily: Noctuoidea
- Family: Erebidae
- Subfamily: Arctiinae
- Genus: Phaio
- Species: P. albicincta

Binomial name
- Phaio albicincta (Schaus, 1896)

Synonyms
- Eupyra albicincta Schaus, 1896

Species of moth

Phaio albicincta is a moth of the subfamily Arctiinae. It was described by Schaus in the year 1896. It is found in Ecuador.
