= Isostyla purefacta =

Scientific classification
- Kingdom: Animalia
- Phylum: Arthropoda
- Clade: Pancrustacea
- Class: Insecta
- Order: Lepidoptera
- Superfamily: Noctuoidea
- Family: Notodontidae
- Genus: Isostyla
- Species: I. purefacta

Binomial name
- Isostyla purefacta L. B. Prout, 1918

Species of moth

Isostyla purefacta is a moth of the family Notodontidae first described by Louis Beethoven Prout in 1918. It is found along the western slope of the Ecuadorian Andes.
