= Scoturopsis =

Scientific classification
- Kingdom: Animalia
- Phylum: Arthropoda
- Clade: Pancrustacea
- Class: Insecta
- Order: Lepidoptera
- Superfamily: Noctuoidea
- Family: Notodontidae
- Tribe: Dioptini
- Genus: Scoturopsis; Hering, 1925

Genus of moths

Scoturopsis is a genus of moths of the family Notodontidae. It consists of the following species:

- Scoturopsis basilinea Hering, 1925
- Scoturopsis coras (Druce, 1893)
- Scoturopsis flaviplaga (Dognin, 1911)
- Scoturopsis franclemonti Miller, 2008
- Scoturopsis seitzi Hering, 1925
- Scoturopsis unifascia (Hering, 1925)
