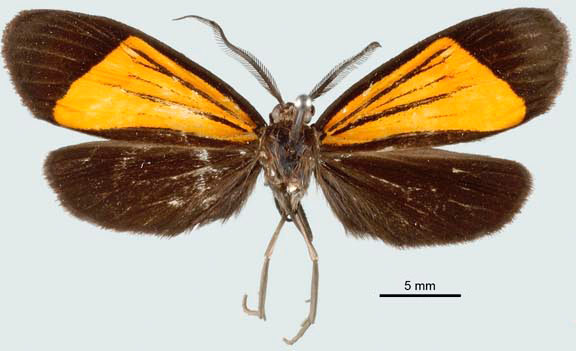
- Notascea brevispinula

Scientific classification
- Kingdom: Animalia
- Phylum: Arthropoda
- Clade: Pancrustacea
- Class: Insecta
- Order: Lepidoptera
- Superfamily: Noctuoidea
- Family: Notodontidae
- Tribe: Josiini
- Genus: Notascea; Miller, 2009

= Notascea =

Genus of moths

Notascea is a genus of moths of the family Notodontidae. It consists of the following species:

- Notascea brevispinula Miller, 2008
- Notascea nudata (Hering, 1925)
- Notascea obliquaria (Warren, 1906)
- Notascea straba Miller, 2008
