= Scoturopsis franclemonti =

Scientific classification
- Kingdom: Animalia
- Phylum: Arthropoda
- Clade: Pancrustacea
- Class: Insecta
- Order: Lepidoptera
- Superfamily: Noctuoidea
- Family: Notodontidae
- Genus: Scoturopsis
- Species: S. franclemonti

Binomial name
- Scoturopsis franclemonti Miller, 2008

Species of moth

Scoturopsis franclemonti is a moth of the family Notodontidae. It is found in the eastern Andes of southern Peru.

The length of the forewings is 11-11.5 mm for males.

== Etymology ==
The species is named in honor of John G. Franclemont.
