= Scoturopsis basilinea =

Scientific classification
- Kingdom: Animalia
- Phylum: Arthropoda
- Clade: Pancrustacea
- Class: Insecta
- Order: Lepidoptera
- Superfamily: Noctuoidea
- Family: Notodontidae
- Genus: Scoturopsis
- Species: S. basilinea

Binomial name
- Scoturopsis basilinea Hering, 1925

Species of moth

Scoturopsis basilinea is a moth of the family Notodontidae. It is found in Bolivia.
