= Stenoplastis carderi =

Scientific classification
- Kingdom: Animalia
- Phylum: Arthropoda
- Clade: Pancrustacea
- Class: Insecta
- Order: Lepidoptera
- Superfamily: Noctuoidea
- Family: Notodontidae
- Genus: Stenoplastis
- Species: S. carderi

Binomial name
- Stenoplastis carderi (H. Druce, 1899)

Synonyms
- Devara carderi H. Druce, 1899

Species of moth

"Stenoplastis" carderi is a moth of the family Notodontidae first described by Herbert Druce in 1899. It is found in Colombia.

== Taxonomy ==
The species probably does not belong in Stenoplastis, but has not been placed in another genus yet.
