= Phanoptis vitrina =

Scientific classification
- Domain: Eukaryota
- Kingdom: Animalia
- Phylum: Arthropoda
- Class: Insecta
- Order: Lepidoptera
- Superfamily: Noctuoidea
- Family: Notodontidae
- Genus: Phanoptis
- Species: P. vitrina

Binomial name
- Phanoptis vitrina H. Druce, 1886

Species of moth

Phanoptis vitrina is a moth of the family Notodontidae first described by Herbert Druce in 1886. It is found in Colombia, Panama and Costa Rica.

Adults have a semitransparent white forewing cross band. Furthermore, the wing ground color is generally chocolate brown.
