= Pseudoricia flavizoma =

Scientific classification
- Kingdom: Animalia
- Phylum: Arthropoda
- Clade: Pancrustacea
- Class: Insecta
- Order: Lepidoptera
- Superfamily: Noctuoidea
- Family: Notodontidae
- Genus: Pseudoricia
- Species: P. flavizoma

Binomial name
- Pseudoricia flavizoma Miller, 2008

Species of moth

Pseudoricia flavizoma is a moth of the family Notodontidae. It is found in wet forest areas at elevations ranging between 200 and 1,100 meters in Costa Rica. It has also been recorded from Panama.

The length of the forewings is 14–15.5 mm for males.
