= Hadesina limbaria =

Scientific classification
- Kingdom: Animalia
- Phylum: Arthropoda
- Clade: Pancrustacea
- Class: Insecta
- Order: Lepidoptera
- Superfamily: Noctuoidea
- Family: Notodontidae
- Genus: Hadesina
- Species: H. limbaria

Binomial name
- Hadesina limbaria Warren, 1900

Species of moth

Hadesina limbaria is a moth of the family Notodontidae first described by William Warren in 1900. It is endemic to the Chocó region of Ecuador and Colombia in north-western South America.
