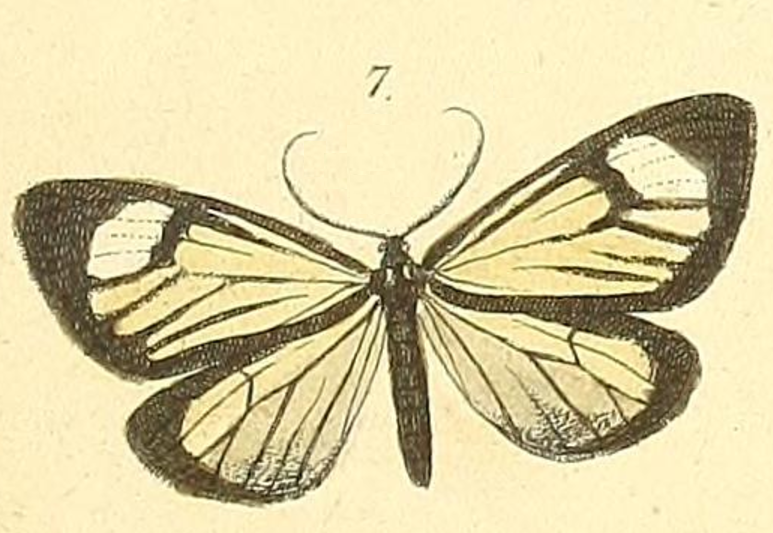
- Male

Scientific classification
- Kingdom: Animalia
- Phylum: Arthropoda
- Clade: Pancrustacea
- Class: Insecta
- Order: Lepidoptera
- Superfamily: Noctuoidea
- Family: Notodontidae
- Genus: Monocreagra
- Species: M. pheloides

Binomial name
- Monocreagra pheloides C. Felder & R. Felder, 1874

Synonyms
- Tanaostyla conjunctiva Warren, 1900; Tanaostyla dilucida Warren, 1897

= Monocreagra pheloides =

Species of moth

Monocreagra pheloides is a moth of the family Notodontidae first described by Cajetan and Rudolf Felder in 1874. It is found in Colombia, Ecuador and Peru.
