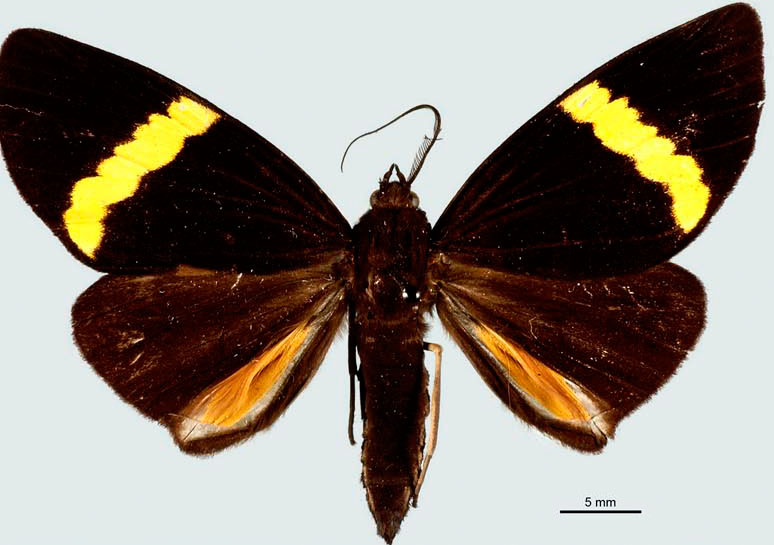

Scientific classification
- Kingdom: Animalia
- Phylum: Arthropoda
- Clade: Pancrustacea
- Class: Insecta
- Order: Lepidoptera
- Superfamily: Noctuoidea
- Family: Notodontidae
- Genus: Phavaraea
- Species: P. rejecta

Binomial name
- Phavaraea rejecta (Geyer, 1832)

Synonyms
- Centronia rejecta Geyer, 1832; Josia stygne Walker, 1854; Eucyane ortropea Druce, 1893

= Phavaraea rejecta =

Species of moth

Phavaraea rejecta is a moth of the family Notodontidae. It is found in South America, including Brazil.
