= Xenomigia consanguinea =

Scientific classification
- Kingdom: Animalia
- Phylum: Arthropoda
- Clade: Pancrustacea
- Class: Insecta
- Order: Lepidoptera
- Superfamily: Noctuoidea
- Family: Notodontidae
- Genus: Xenomigia
- Species: X. consanguinea

Binomial name
- Xenomigia consanguinea (Dognin, 1911)

Synonyms
- Tithraustes consanguinea Dognin, 1911

Species of moth

Xenomigia consanguinea is a moth of the family Notodontidae. It occurs at upper elevations in the central Andes of Colombia.

It has a forewing length of 20–22 cm, making it one of the largest described species in the genus Xenomigia.
