= Xenomigia brachyptera =

Scientific classification
- Kingdom: Animalia
- Phylum: Arthropoda
- Clade: Pancrustacea
- Class: Insecta
- Order: Lepidoptera
- Superfamily: Noctuoidea
- Family: Notodontidae
- Genus: Xenomigia
- Species: X. brachyptera

Binomial name
- Xenomigia brachyptera Sattler and Wojtusiak, 2000

Species of moth

Xenomigia brachyptera is a moth of the family Notodontidae. It is found in the Andes of western Venezuela.
