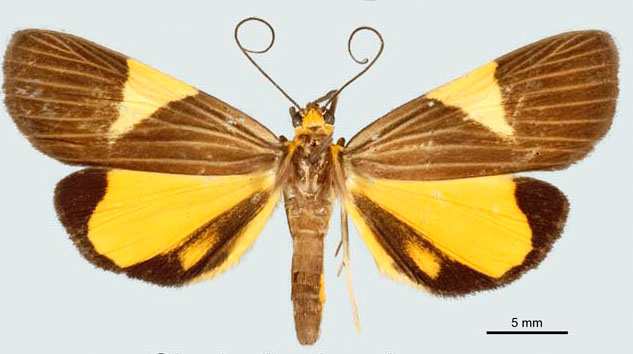

Scientific classification
- Kingdom: Animalia
- Phylum: Arthropoda
- Clade: Pancrustacea
- Class: Insecta
- Order: Lepidoptera
- Superfamily: Noctuoidea
- Family: Notodontidae
- Tribe: Dioptini
- Genus: Cleptophasia; Prout, 1918
- Species: C. scissa

Binomial name
- Cleptophasia scissa (Warren, 1909)

Synonyms
- Oricia scissa Warren, 1909

= Cleptophasia =

Genus of moths

Cleptophasia is a monotypic moth genus of the family Notodontidae described by Prout in 1918. It consists of only one species, Cleptophasia scissa, first described by William Warren in 1909, which is found in Brazil, French Guiana and Venezuela.
