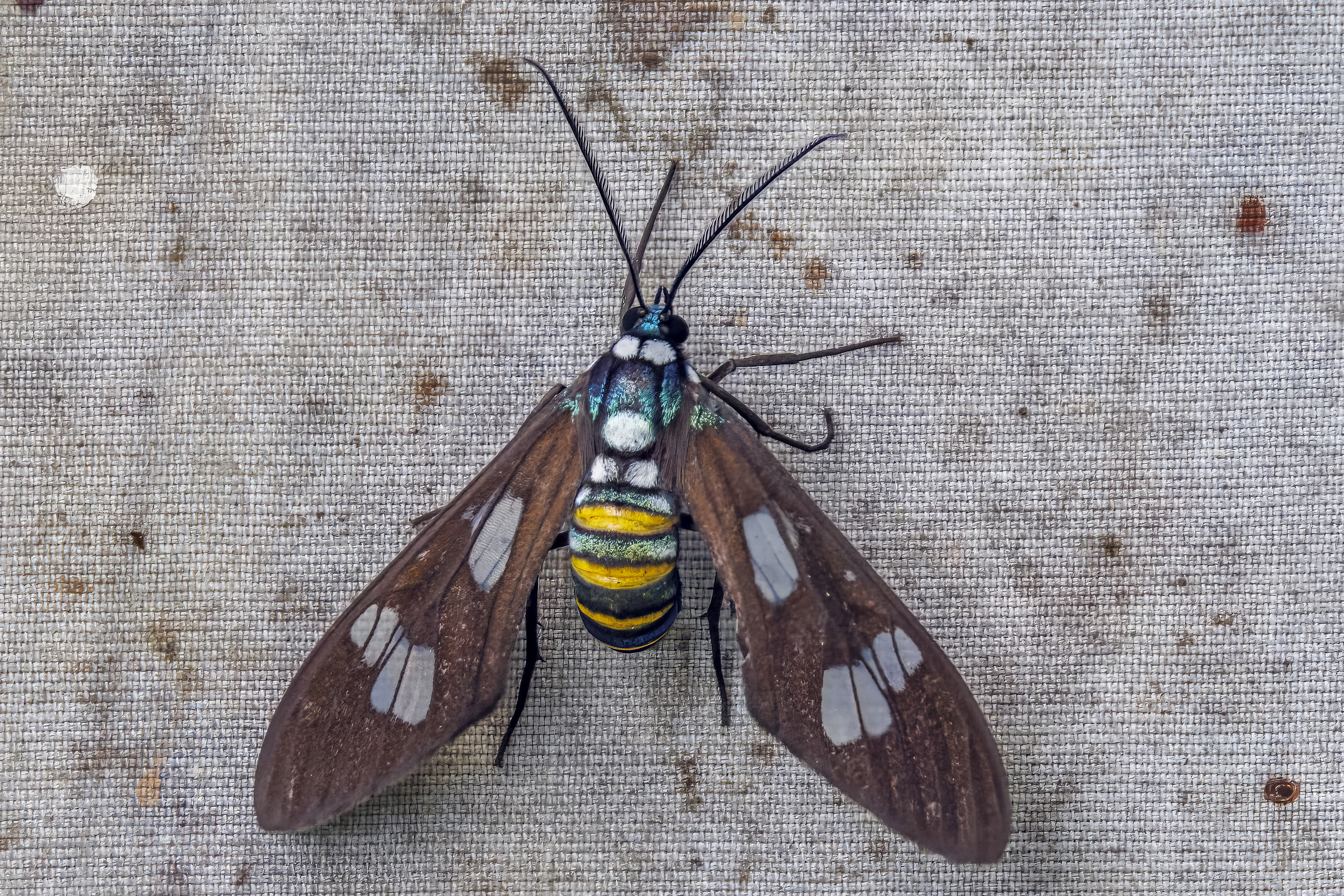
- Phaio acquiguttata, Ecuador

Scientific classification
- Domain: Eukaryota
- Kingdom: Animalia
- Phylum: Arthropoda
- Class: Insecta
- Order: Lepidoptera
- Superfamily: Noctuoidea
- Family: Erebidae
- Subfamily: Arctiinae
- Genus: Phaio; Neumoegen, 1894

Synonyms
- Mydropastea Hampson, 1898

= Phaio =

Genus of moths

Phaio is a genus of moths in the subfamily Arctiinae.

== Species ==
- Phaio acquiguttata Dognin, 1909
- Phaio albicincta Schaus, 1896
- Phaio aurata Schaus, 1892
- Phaio bacchans Schaus, 1892
- Phaio caeruleonigra Schaus, 1905
- Phaio cephalena Druce, 1883
- Phaio geminiguttata Dognin, 1911
- Phaio longipennis Neum., 1894
- Phaio quadriguttata Dognin, 1909
- Phaio salmoni Druce, 1883
- Phaio stratiotes Dyar, 1914
- Phaio sylva Schaus, 1896
- Phaio unimacula Rothschild, 1911
