= Xenomigia =

Scientific classification
- Kingdom: Animalia
- Phylum: Arthropoda
- Clade: Pancrustacea
- Class: Insecta
- Order: Lepidoptera
- Superfamily: Noctuoidea
- Family: Notodontidae
- Tribe: Dioptini
- Genus: Xenomigia; Warren, 1906

Synonyms
- Ceraeotricha Hering, 1925; Tolimicola Prout, 1918

Genus of moths

Xenomigia is a genus of moths of the family Notodontidae.

== Species ==
The genus consists of the following species:

- Xenomigia brachyptera Sattler and Wojtusiak, 2000
- Xenomigia caesura Miller, 2011
- Xenomigia concinna Dognin, 1911
- Xenomigia consanguinea (Dognin, 1911)
- Xenomigia cosanga Miller, 2011
- Xenomigia crenula Miller, 2011
- Xenomigia cuneifera Dognin, 1913
- Xenomigia dactyloides Miller, 2011
- Xenomigia disciplaga Hering, 1926
- Xenomigia fassli Prout, 1918
- Xenomigia flavivulta Miller, 2011
- Xenomigia involuta Miller, 2008
- Xenomigia monticolata (Maassen, 1890)
- Xenomigia noctipenna Miller, 2011
- Xenomigia nubilata (Dognin, 1912)
- Xenomigia phaeoloma Miller, 2011
- Xenomigia pinasi Miller, 2008
- Xenomigia premiosa Miller, 2011
- Xenomigia sordida Dognin, 1913
- Xenomigia veninotata Warren, 1906
- Xenomigia wilmeri Miller, 2011
