= Pseudoricia =

Scientific classification
- Kingdom: Animalia
- Phylum: Arthropoda
- Clade: Pancrustacea
- Class: Insecta
- Order: Lepidoptera
- Superfamily: Noctuoidea
- Family: Notodontidae
- Tribe: Dioptini
- Genus: Pseudoricia; Prout, 1918

Genus of moths

Pseudoricia is a genus of moths of the family Notodontidae. It consists of the following species:

- Pseudoricia flavizoma Miller, 2009
- Pseudoricia ovisigna (Prout, 1918)
- Pseudoricia sibyllae (Druce, 1885)
