= Hadesina caerulescens =

Scientific classification
- Kingdom: Animalia
- Phylum: Arthropoda
- Clade: Pancrustacea
- Class: Insecta
- Order: Lepidoptera
- Superfamily: Noctuoidea
- Family: Notodontidae
- Genus: Hadesina
- Species: H. caerulescens

Binomial name
- Hadesina caerulescens (Schaus, 1913)

Synonyms
- Hyrmina caerulescens Schaus, 1913

Species of moth

Hadesina caerulescens is a moth of the family Notodontidae first described by William Schaus in 1913. It is found in Costa Rica and Panama.
