= Xenormicola =

Scientific classification
- Kingdom: Animalia
- Phylum: Arthropoda
- Clade: Pancrustacea
- Class: Insecta
- Order: Lepidoptera
- Superfamily: Noctuoidea
- Family: Notodontidae
- Tribe: Dioptini
- Genus: Xenormicola; Hering, 1928

Genus of moths

Xenormicola is a genus of moths of the family Notodontidae. It consists of the following species:

- Xenormicola extensa (Hering, 1925)
- Xenormicola prouti Hering, 1928
