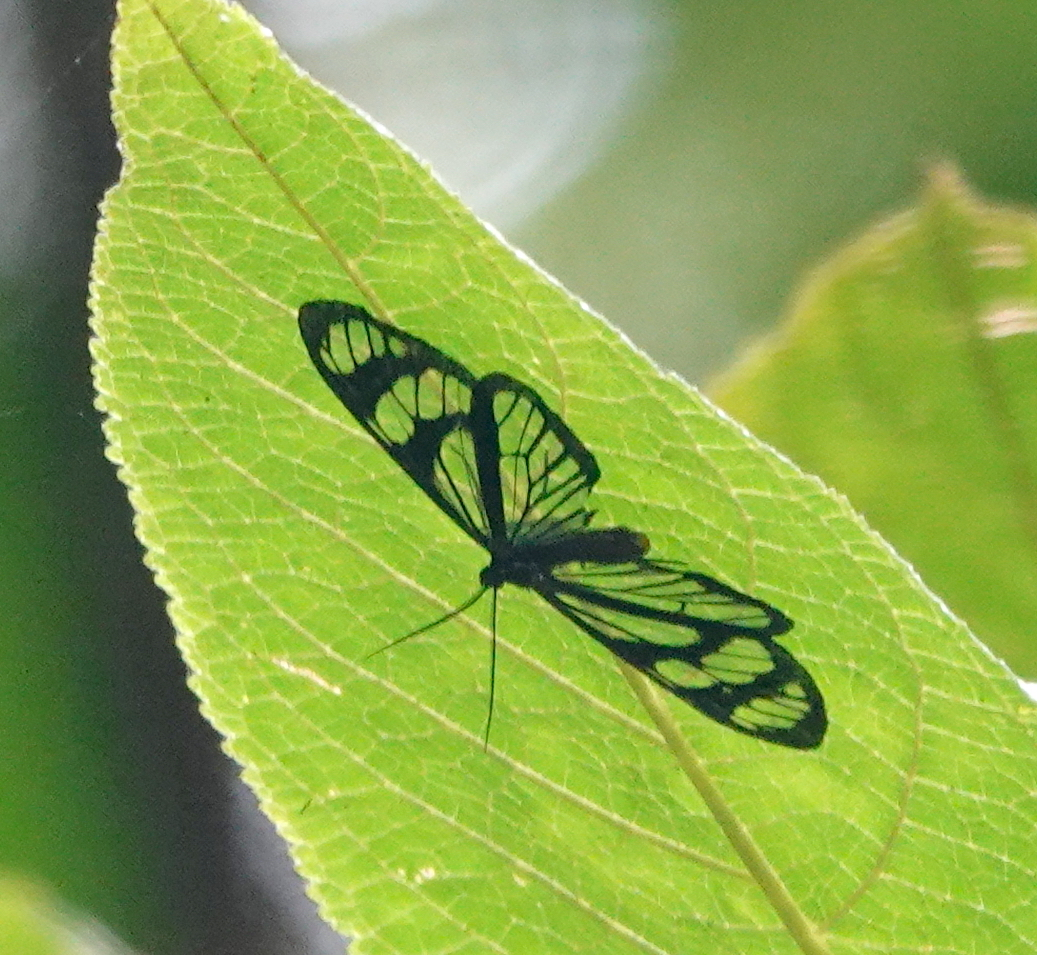

Scientific classification
- Kingdom: Animalia
- Phylum: Arthropoda
- Clade: Pancrustacea
- Class: Insecta
- Order: Lepidoptera
- Superfamily: Noctuoidea
- Family: Notodontidae
- Tribe: Dioptini
- Genus: Phanoptis; C. and R. Felder, 1874

= Phanoptis =

Genus of moths

Phanoptis is a genus of moths of the family Notodontidae. It was erected by the entomologists C. and R. Felder in 1874 for the species Phanoptis cyanomelas, described alongside the genus. They have highly variable colorations, being either generally dark with red or white markings on the forewings, or mostly transparent with dark veins and edges to the wings. The genus is a Neotropical endemic, being found from Bolivia north into southern Mexico.

== Taxonomy ==
The genus Phanoptis was erected by the entomologists C. and R. Felder in 1874. The type species of the genus is Phanoptis cyanomelas, described in the same paper by the same authors. The genus currently has six described species divided into two species groups, the cyanomelas group and fatidica group.

== Description ==
Phanoptis moths have highly variable forewings depending on the species. The forewings can be glossy blue-black with an oblique white stripe, dark brownish with three transparent patches intersected by the dark veins, or brown crossed by a diagonal red stripe. The hindwing is similarly variable, being either wholly blue-black in color or mostly transparent with dark edges and veins. The length of the forewings is 20.0–27.0 mm for males and 22.0–30.0 mm for females.

== Distribution and habitat ==
The genus is a Neotropical endemic, being found from Bolivia north into southern Mexico. In South America, these moths are restricted to the Andes from Bolivia to northern Venezuela, and are entirely absent from Amazonia. The species of these genus are generally uncommon.

== Species ==
It consists of the following species:

- Phanoptis cyanomelas C. and R. Felder, 1874
- Phanoptis donahuei Miller, 2008
- Phanoptis fatidica (Dognin, 1910)
- Phanoptis miltorrhabda Prout, 1922
- Phanoptis taxila Druce, 1907
- Phanoptis vitrina Druce, 1886
