= Isostyla picata =

Scientific classification
- Kingdom: Animalia
- Phylum: Arthropoda
- Clade: Pancrustacea
- Class: Insecta
- Order: Lepidoptera
- Superfamily: Noctuoidea
- Family: Notodontidae
- Genus: Isostyla
- Species: I. picata

Binomial name
- Isostyla picata (Warren, 1900)

Synonyms
- Tithraustes picata Warren, 1900; Isostyla ampliplaga Hering, 1930; Tithraustes intersecta Warren, 1900

Species of moth

Isostyla picata is a moth of the family Notodontidae first described by William Warren in 1900. It is found in Colombia and Ecuador.
