= Xenomigia sordida =

Scientific classification
- Kingdom: Animalia
- Phylum: Arthropoda
- Clade: Pancrustacea
- Class: Insecta
- Order: Lepidoptera
- Superfamily: Noctuoidea
- Family: Notodontidae
- Genus: Xenomigia
- Species: X. sordida

Binomial name
- Xenomigia sordida Dognin, 1913

Species of moth

Xenomigia sordida is a moth of the family Notodontidae. It is found in Colombia.
