= Momonipta albiplaga =

Scientific classification
- Kingdom: Animalia
- Phylum: Arthropoda
- Clade: Pancrustacea
- Class: Insecta
- Order: Lepidoptera
- Superfamily: Noctuoidea
- Family: Notodontidae
- Genus: Momonipta
- Species: M. albiplaga

Binomial name
- Momonipta albiplaga Warren, 1897

Species of moth

Momonipta albiplaga is a moth of the family Notodontidae. It is found along the western slope of the Colombian Andes.
