= Xenomigia dactyloides =

Scientific classification
- Kingdom: Animalia
- Phylum: Arthropoda
- Clade: Pancrustacea
- Class: Insecta
- Order: Lepidoptera
- Superfamily: Noctuoidea
- Family: Notodontidae
- Genus: Xenomigia
- Species: X. dactyloides

Binomial name
- Xenomigia dactyloides Miller, 2011

Species of moth

Xenomigia dactyloides is a moth of the family Notodontidae. It is found in Ecuador, from the Yanayacu Biological Station in the Napo Province south to Sierra Azul, in the Huacamayos Range.

The length of the forewings is 16-20.5 mm.
