= Xenormicola prouti =

Scientific classification
- Kingdom: Animalia
- Phylum: Arthropoda
- Clade: Pancrustacea
- Class: Insecta
- Order: Lepidoptera
- Superfamily: Noctuoidea
- Family: Notodontidae
- Genus: Xenormicola
- Species: X. prouti

Binomial name
- Xenormicola prouti Hering, 1928

Species of moth

Xenormicola prouti is a moth of the family Notodontidae. It is found in Bolivia.
