= Hadesina goeleti =

Scientific classification
- Kingdom: Animalia
- Phylum: Arthropoda
- Clade: Pancrustacea
- Class: Insecta
- Order: Lepidoptera
- Superfamily: Noctuoidea
- Family: Notodontidae
- Genus: Hadesina
- Species: H. goeleti

Binomial name
- Hadesina goeleti Miller, 2008

Species of moth

Hadesina goeleti is a moth of the family Notodontidae first described by James S. Miller in 2008. It is found in north-western Costa Rica, near the Nicaraguan border.

The length of the forewings is 14–15.5 mm for males and 15.5–16 mm for females.
