= Argentala mesitana =

Scientific classification
- Kingdom: Animalia
- Phylum: Arthropoda
- Clade: Pancrustacea
- Class: Insecta
- Order: Lepidoptera
- Superfamily: Noctuoidea
- Family: Notodontidae
- Genus: Argentala
- Species: A. mesitana

Binomial name
- Argentala mesitana (Dognin, 1917)

Synonyms
- Polypoetes mesitana Dognin, 1917; Momonipta felderi Prout, 1918

Species of moth

Argentala mesitana is a moth of the family Notodontidae first described by Paul Dognin in 1917. It is found along the western slope of the Colombian Andes.
