= Xenomigia fassli =

Scientific classification
- Kingdom: Animalia
- Phylum: Arthropoda
- Clade: Pancrustacea
- Class: Insecta
- Order: Lepidoptera
- Superfamily: Noctuoidea
- Family: Notodontidae
- Genus: Xenomigia
- Species: X. fassli

Binomial name
- Xenomigia fassli (Prout, 1918)

Synonyms
- Tolimicola fassli Prout, 1918

Species of moth

Xenomigia fassli is a species of moth in the family Notodontidae. It is found in Colombia.

The length of the forewings is about 22 mm. Adults have long, broad wings, and the forewings are strongly mottled with white.
