= Hadesina =

Scientific classification
- Kingdom: Animalia
- Phylum: Arthropoda
- Clade: Pancrustacea
- Class: Insecta
- Order: Lepidoptera
- Superfamily: Noctuoidea
- Family: Notodontidae
- Tribe: Dioptini
- Genus: Hadesina; Warren, 1900

Genus of moths

Hadesina is a genus of moths of the family Notodontidae. It consists of the following species:

- Hadesina caerulescens (Schaus, 1913)
- Hadesina divisa Dognin, 1902
- Hadesina goeleti Miller, 2008
- Hadesina limbaria Warren, 1900
