= Stenoplastis dyeri =

Scientific classification
- Kingdom: Animalia
- Phylum: Arthropoda
- Clade: Pancrustacea
- Class: Insecta
- Order: Lepidoptera
- Superfamily: Noctuoidea
- Family: Notodontidae
- Genus: Stenoplastis
- Species: S. dyeri

Binomial name
- Stenoplastis dyeri Miller, 2008

Species of moth

Stenoplastis dyeri is a moth of the family Notodontidae. It is found on the eastern side of the Andes in Ecuador.

The length of the forewings is 11.5–12 mm for males and 13 mm for females. The larvae feed on Geonoma orbignyana.
