= Pareuchontha fuscivena =

Scientific classification
- Kingdom: Animalia
- Phylum: Arthropoda
- Clade: Pancrustacea
- Class: Insecta
- Order: Lepidoptera
- Superfamily: Noctuoidea
- Family: Notodontidae
- Genus: Pareuchontha
- Species: P. fuscivena

Binomial name
- Pareuchontha fuscivena Miller, 2008

Species of moth

Pareuchontha fuscivena is a moth of the family Notodontidae first described by James S. Miller in 2008. It is found in the western foothills of the Andes in Colombia.

The length of the forewings is 14–15 mm (0.55–0.59 in) for males.
