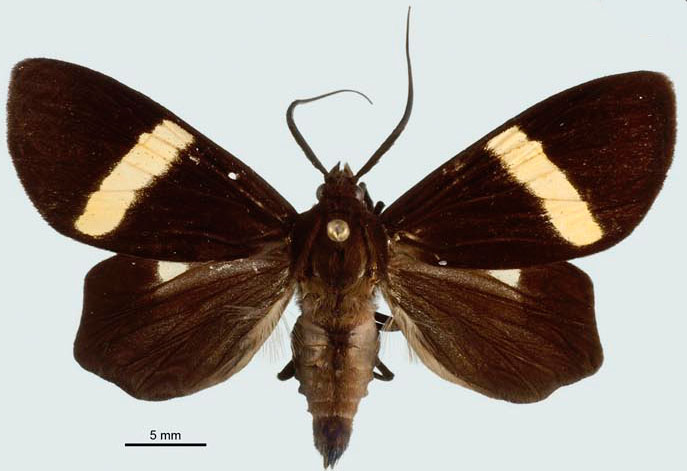

Scientific classification
- Kingdom: Animalia
- Phylum: Arthropoda
- Clade: Pancrustacea
- Class: Insecta
- Order: Lepidoptera
- Superfamily: Noctuoidea
- Family: Notodontidae
- Genus: Phavaraea
- Species: P. rectangularis

Binomial name
- Phavaraea rectangularis (Toulgoët & Navatte, 1997)

Synonyms
- Pseudophaloe rectangularis Toulgoët & Navatte, 1997

= Phavaraea rectangularis =

Species of moth

Phavaraea rectangularis is a moth of the family Notodontidae first described by Hervé de Toulgoët in 1997. It is only known from French Guiana.
