= Phaio caeruleonigra =

Scientific classification
- Kingdom: Animalia
- Phylum: Arthropoda
- Clade: Pancrustacea
- Class: Insecta
- Order: Lepidoptera
- Superfamily: Noctuoidea
- Family: Erebidae
- Subfamily: Arctiinae
- Genus: Phaio
- Species: P. caeruleonigra

Binomial name
- Phaio caeruleonigra Schaus, 1905

Species of moth

Phaio caeruleonigra is a moth of the subfamily Arctiinae. It was described by William Schaus in 1905. It is found in Peru.
