= Argentala subalba =

Scientific classification
- Kingdom: Animalia
- Phylum: Arthropoda
- Clade: Pancrustacea
- Class: Insecta
- Order: Lepidoptera
- Superfamily: Noctuoidea
- Family: Notodontidae
- Genus: Argentala
- Species: A. subalba

Binomial name
- Argentala subalba (Walker, 1859)

Synonyms
- Chrysauge subalba Walker, 1854

Species of moth

Argentala subalba is a moth of the family Notodontidae first described by Francis Walker in . It is found in Venezuela.

It is the smallest member of the genus Argentala, with a forewing length of 12–14 mm.
