= Pareuchontha grandimacula =

Scientific classification
- Kingdom: Animalia
- Phylum: Arthropoda
- Clade: Pancrustacea
- Class: Insecta
- Order: Lepidoptera
- Superfamily: Noctuoidea
- Family: Notodontidae
- Genus: Pareuchontha
- Species: P. grandimacula

Binomial name
- Pareuchontha grandimacula (Dognin, 1902)

Synonyms
- Stenoplastis grandimacula Dognin, 1902; Momonipta euchonthoides Prout, 1918; Stenoplastis inversa Dognin, 1916; Stenoplastis lactigera Hering, 1925; Stenoplastis occlusa Dognin, 1916

Species of moth

Pareuchontha grandimacula is a moth of the family Notodontidae. It is restricted to southern Peru and Bolivia.
