= Pareuchontha =

Scientific classification
- Kingdom: Animalia
- Phylum: Arthropoda
- Clade: Pancrustacea
- Class: Insecta
- Order: Lepidoptera
- Superfamily: Noctuoidea
- Family: Notodontidae
- Tribe: Dioptini
- Genus: Pareuchontha; Miller, 1989

Genus of moths

Pareuchontha is a genus of moths of the family Notodontidae. It consists of the following species:

- Pareuchontha albimargo Miller, 1989
- Pareuchontha albipes (Maassen, 1890)
- Pareuchontha fuscivena Miller, 2008
- Pareuchontha grandimacula (Dognin, 1902)
- Pareuchontha olibra Miller, 2008
