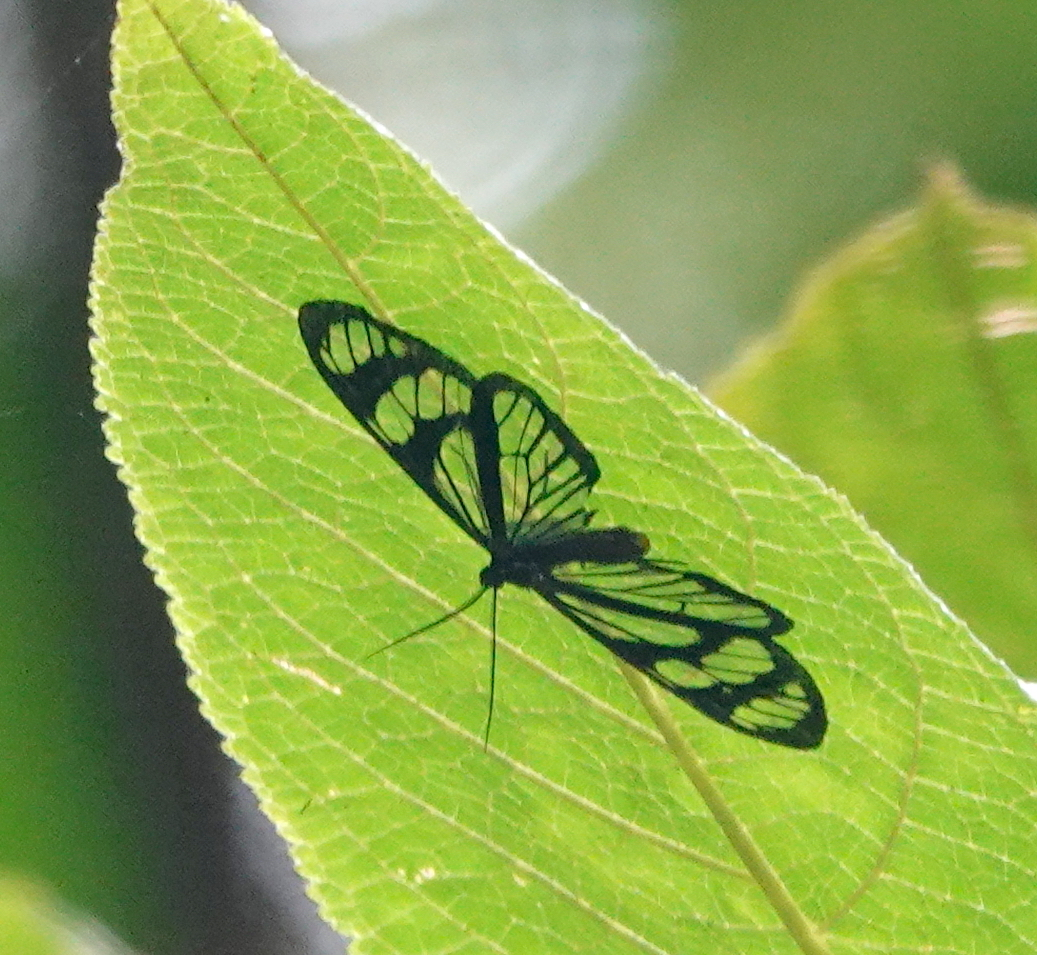

Scientific classification
- Kingdom: Animalia
- Phylum: Arthropoda
- Class: Insecta
- Order: Lepidoptera
- Superfamily: Noctuoidea
- Family: Notodontidae
- Genus: Phanoptis
- Species: P. cyanomelas

Binomial name
- Phanoptis cyanomelas C. Felder & R. Felder, 1874

= Phanoptis cyanomelas =

Species of moth

Phanoptis cyanomelas is a moth of the family Notodontidae first described by Cajetan and Rudolf Felder in 1874. It is found in Costa Rica, Panama, Colombia and Ecuador.

The larvae feed on Rinorea species.
