= Phaio quadriguttata =

Scientific classification
- Kingdom: Animalia
- Phylum: Arthropoda
- Clade: Pancrustacea
- Class: Insecta
- Order: Lepidoptera
- Superfamily: Noctuoidea
- Family: Erebidae
- Subfamily: Arctiinae
- Genus: Phaio
- Species: P. quadriguttata

Binomial name
- Phaio quadriguttata Dognin, 1909

Species of moth

Phaio quadriguttata is a moth of the subfamily Arctiinae. It was described by Paul Dognin in 1909. It is found in Ecuador.
