= Dolophrosyne elongata =

Scientific classification
- Kingdom: Animalia
- Phylum: Arthropoda
- Clade: Pancrustacea
- Class: Insecta
- Order: Lepidoptera
- Superfamily: Noctuoidea
- Family: Notodontidae
- Genus: Dolophrosyne
- Species: D. elongata

Binomial name
- Dolophrosyne elongata (Hering, 1925)

Synonyms
- Scoturopsis elongata Hering, 1925

Species of moth

Dolophrosyne elongata is a moth of the family Notodontidae first described by Hering in 1925. It is found in Peru and Bolivia.

Adults are completely dark chocolate brown, without any markings on the wings.
