= Pseudoricia sibyllae =

Scientific classification
- Kingdom: Animalia
- Phylum: Arthropoda
- Clade: Pancrustacea
- Class: Insecta
- Order: Lepidoptera
- Superfamily: Noctuoidea
- Family: Notodontidae
- Genus: Pseudoricia
- Species: P. sibyllae

Binomial name
- Pseudoricia sibyllae (H. Druce, 1885)

Synonyms
- Josiodes sibyllae H. Druce, 1885

Species of moth

Pseudoricia sibyllae is a moth of the family Notodontidae first described by Herbert Druce in 1885. It is found in Ecuador.
