= Cacolyces =

Scientific classification
- Kingdom: Animalia
- Phylum: Arthropoda
- Clade: Pancrustacea
- Class: Insecta
- Order: Lepidoptera
- Superfamily: Noctuoidea
- Family: Notodontidae
- Tribe: Dioptini
- Genus: Cacolyces; Warren, 1906
- Species: C. plagifera

Binomial name
- Cacolyces plagifera (Walker, 1856)

Synonyms
- Lyces plagifera Walker, 1856

Species of moth

Cacolyces is a monotypic moth genus of the family Notodontidae described by Warren in 1906. It consists of only one species, Cacolyces plagifera, first described by Francis Walker in 1856, which is found in Brazil, Venezuela, Guyana, Suriname and French Guiana.
