= Monocreagra unimacula =

Scientific classification
- Kingdom: Animalia
- Phylum: Arthropoda
- Clade: Pancrustacea
- Class: Insecta
- Order: Lepidoptera
- Superfamily: Noctuoidea
- Family: Notodontidae
- Genus: Monocreagra
- Species: M. unimacula

Binomial name
- Monocreagra unimacula (Warren, 1897)

Synonyms
- Tanaostyla unimacula Warren, 1897

Species of moth

Monocreagra unimacula is a moth of the family Notodontidae. It is found in Bolivia and Peru.
