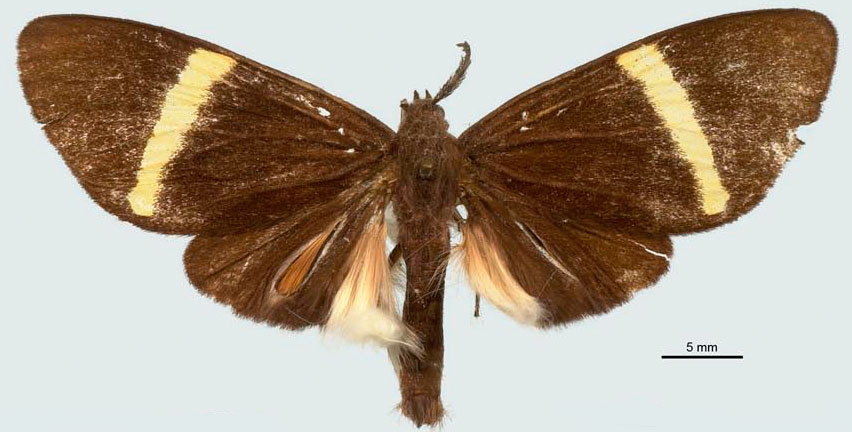
- Polyptychia fasciculosa

Scientific classification
- Kingdom: Animalia
- Phylum: Arthropoda
- Clade: Pancrustacea
- Class: Insecta
- Order: Lepidoptera
- Superfamily: Noctuoidea
- Family: Notodontidae
- Tribe: Josiini
- Genus: Polyptychia; C. Felder & R. Felder, 1874

= Polyptychia =

Genus of moths

Polyptychia is a genus of moths of the family Notodontidae. It was described by Cajetan and Rudolf Felder in 1874. It is found in central and northern South America.

== Species ==
There are two recognized species:

- Polyptychia fasciculosa C. Felder & R. Felder, 1874
- Polyptychia hermieri J. S. Miller, 2009
