= Hadesina divisa =

Scientific classification
- Kingdom: Animalia
- Phylum: Arthropoda
- Clade: Pancrustacea
- Class: Insecta
- Order: Lepidoptera
- Superfamily: Noctuoidea
- Family: Notodontidae
- Genus: Hadesina
- Species: H. divisa

Binomial name
- Hadesina divisa Dognin, 1902

Synonyms
- Brachyglene divisa Dognin, 1902

Species of moth

Hadesina divisa is a moth of the family Notodontidae first described by Paul Dognin in 1902. It is found in Colombia.
