= Stenoplastis satyroides =

Scientific classification
- Kingdom: Animalia
- Phylum: Arthropoda
- Clade: Pancrustacea
- Class: Insecta
- Order: Lepidoptera
- Superfamily: Noctuoidea
- Family: Notodontidae
- Genus: Stenoplastis
- Species: S. satyroides

Binomial name
- Stenoplastis satyroides C. Felder & R. Felder, 1874

Species of moth

Stenoplastis satyroides is a moth of the family Notodontidae. It is found in Colombia.
