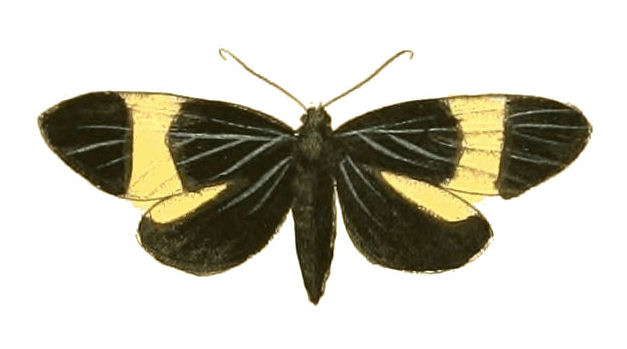
- Illustration by Dru Drury

Scientific classification
- Kingdom: Animalia
- Phylum: Arthropoda
- Clade: Pancrustacea
- Class: Insecta
- Order: Lepidoptera
- Superfamily: Noctuoidea
- Family: Notodontidae
- Genus: Brachyglene
- Species: B. caenea

Binomial name
- Brachyglene caenea (Drury, 1782)

Synonyms
- Phalaena caenea Drury, 1782; Callimorpha caenea (Drury, 1782); Scedrosa extensa Walker, 1864

= Brachyglene caenea =

Species of moth

Brachyglene caenea is a moth of the family Notodontidae first described by Dru Drury in 1782. It is restricted to south-eastern Brazil, from Rio de Janeiro south to Santa Catarina.

== Description ==
Antennae black and setaceous. Thorax and abdomen nearly black. Wings deep brown, nearly black; the anterior having a yellow band crossing them from the anterior edges to the lower corners; and the posterior having a broad yellow streak on the anterior edges. Margins of the wings entire. Wingspan 2 3/4 inches (70 mm).
