= Phaio sylva =

Scientific classification
- Kingdom: Animalia
- Phylum: Arthropoda
- Clade: Pancrustacea
- Class: Insecta
- Order: Lepidoptera
- Superfamily: Noctuoidea
- Family: Erebidae
- Subfamily: Arctiinae
- Genus: Phaio
- Species: P. sylva

Binomial name
- Phaio sylva (Schaus, 1896)

Synonyms
- Eupyra sylva Schaus, 1896; Phaio sylva f. impellucida Draudt

Species of moth

Phaio sylva is a moth of the subfamily Arctiinae. It was described by Schaus in 1896. It is found in Brazil.
