= Argentala brehmi =

Scientific classification
- Kingdom: Animalia
- Phylum: Arthropoda
- Clade: Pancrustacea
- Class: Insecta
- Order: Lepidoptera
- Superfamily: Noctuoidea
- Family: Notodontidae
- Genus: Argentala
- Species: A. brehmi

Binomial name
- Argentala brehmi Miller, 2008

Species of moth

Argentala brehmi is a moth of the family Notodontidae first described by James S. Miller in 2008. The length of the forewings is 13.5–14.5 mm for males and 15 mm for females. The species has two color morphs. The first has entirely chocolate to blackish-brown wings dorsally, marked only with an orange-yellow lining to the veins. The second has white fascia on both wings and a whitish patch surrounding the discal cell on the hindwing. Both morphs are in their remaining morphology. Argentala brehmi is endemic to Ecuador, where it has been recorded only from Estación Cientifica San Francisco in Zamora-Chinchipe Province. It inhabits cloud forests at elevations of 1,800–2,040 m (5,910–6,690 ft).

== Taxonomy ==
Argentala brehmi was formally described by the American entomologist James S. Miller in 2008 based on a male collected from Zamora-Chinchipe in Ecuador. The species is named after Gunnar Brehm, a German lepidopterist who caught the holotype and one of the paratypes of the species.

== Description ==
The length of the forewings is 13.5–14.5 mm for males and 15 mm for females. The species has two color morphs. The first morph is dorsally chocolate brown to blackish-brown on the forewing and hindwing, with an orange-yellow lining to the veins that is the only maculation on the wings. The second morph has prominent white fascia on the forewing and hindwing, as well as a whitish patch surrounding the discal cell on the hindwing. The undersides of the wings are similar in both morphs. The underside of the forewing is dark gray to fuscous. The underside of the hindwing is silvery-white for the two-thirds of the area closest to the base and dark gray for the furthest quarter.

== Distribution and habitat ==
Argentala brehmi is endemic to Ecuador, where it inhabits the eastern versant of the Andes. It has been recorded only from Estación Cientifica San Francisco in Zamora-Chinchipe Province. It inhabits cloud forests at elevations of 1,800–2,040 m (5,910–6,690 ft).
