= Scoturopsis unifascia =

Scientific classification
- Kingdom: Animalia
- Phylum: Arthropoda
- Clade: Pancrustacea
- Class: Insecta
- Order: Lepidoptera
- Superfamily: Noctuoidea
- Family: Notodontidae
- Genus: Scoturopsis
- Species: S. unifascia

Binomial name
- Scoturopsis unifascia (Hering, 1925)

Synonyms
- Stenoplastis unifascia Hering, 1925

Species of moth

Scoturopsis unifascia is a moth of the family Notodontidae. It is found in Bolivia.
