= Brachyglene patinata =

Scientific classification
- Kingdom: Animalia
- Phylum: Arthropoda
- Clade: Pancrustacea
- Class: Insecta
- Order: Lepidoptera
- Superfamily: Noctuoidea
- Family: Notodontidae
- Genus: Brachyglene
- Species: B. patinata

Binomial name
- Brachyglene patinata L. B. Prout, 1918

Species of moth

Brachyglene patinata is a moth of the family Notodontidae first described by Louis Beethoven Prout in 1918. It is found in Brazil.
