= Brachyglene subtilis =

Scientific classification
- Kingdom: Animalia
- Phylum: Arthropoda
- Clade: Pancrustacea
- Class: Insecta
- Order: Lepidoptera
- Superfamily: Noctuoidea
- Family: Notodontidae
- Genus: Brachyglene
- Species: B. subtilis

Binomial name
- Brachyglene subtilis (C. Felder & R. Felder, 1874)

Synonyms
- Anatolis subtilis C. & R. Felder, 1874; Eudesmia punctata Druce, 1899

Species of moth

Brachyglene subtilis is a moth of the family Notodontidae first described by Cajetan and Rudolf Felder in 1874. It is common in the dry forests of northern Venezuela, but is also found in Colombia and Paraguay.

The larvae feed on Bauhinia splendens.
