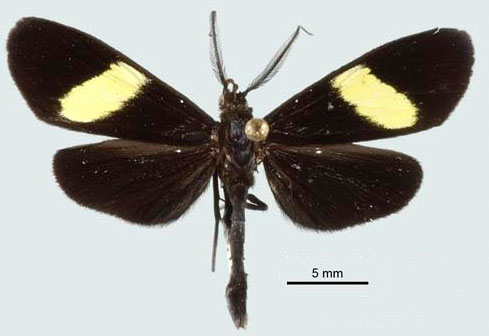

Scientific classification
- Kingdom: Animalia
- Phylum: Arthropoda
- Clade: Pancrustacea
- Class: Insecta
- Order: Lepidoptera
- Superfamily: Noctuoidea
- Family: Notodontidae
- Genus: Phintia
- Species: P. broweri

Binomial name
- Phintia broweri J.S. Miller, 2009

= Phintia broweri =

Species of moth

Phintia broweri is a moth of the family Notodontidae. It is found in South America, including Peru and Bolivia.

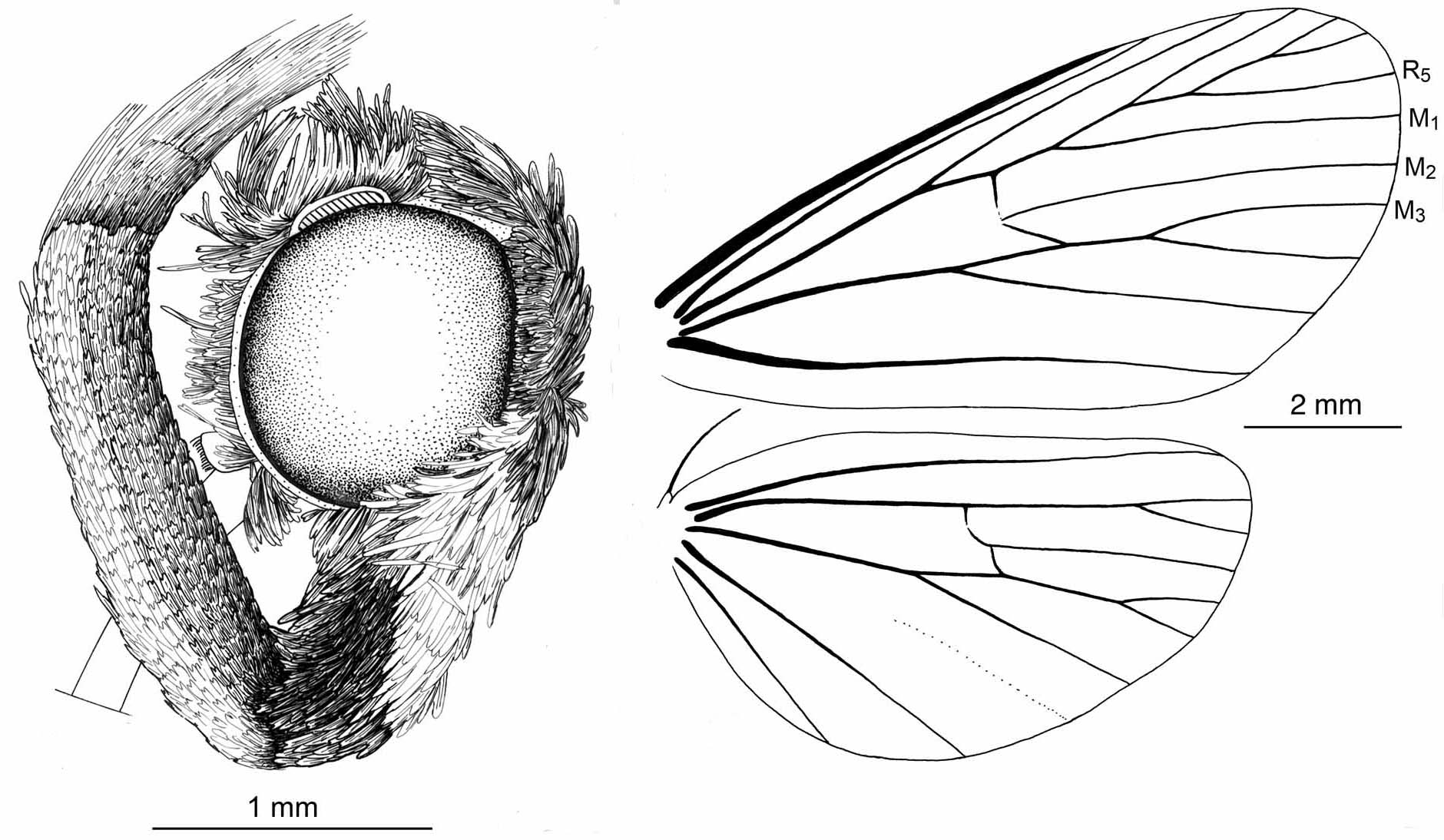
Head with elongated labial palpus and wing venation
