= Xenomigia involuta =

Scientific classification
- Kingdom: Animalia
- Phylum: Arthropoda
- Clade: Pancrustacea
- Class: Insecta
- Order: Lepidoptera
- Superfamily: Noctuoidea
- Family: Notodontidae
- Genus: Xenomigia
- Species: X. involuta

Binomial name
- Xenomigia involuta Miller, 2008

Species of moth

Xenomigia involuta is a moth of the family Notodontidae. It is endemic to cloud forests on the western slope of the Ecuadorian Andes.

The length of the forewings is 14.5–16 mm for males and 16–17.5 mm for females.
