= Dolophrosyne coniades =

Scientific classification
- Kingdom: Animalia
- Phylum: Arthropoda
- Clade: Pancrustacea
- Class: Insecta
- Order: Lepidoptera
- Superfamily: Noctuoidea
- Family: Notodontidae
- Genus: Dolophrosyne
- Species: D. coniades

Binomial name
- Dolophrosyne coniades (H. Druce, 1893)

Synonyms
- Trochiodes coniades H. Druce, 1893

Species of moth

Dolophrosyne coniades is a moth of the family Notodontidae first described by Herbert Druce in 1893. It is found in cloud-forest habitats in Ecuador.

The larvae feed on Chusquea scandens.
