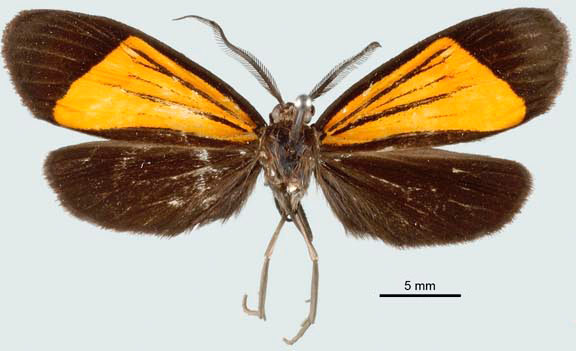

Scientific classification
- Kingdom: Animalia
- Phylum: Arthropoda
- Clade: Pancrustacea
- Class: Insecta
- Order: Lepidoptera
- Superfamily: Noctuoidea
- Family: Notodontidae
- Genus: Notascea
- Species: N. brevispinula

Binomial name
- Notascea brevispinula Miller, 2008

= Notascea brevispinula =

Species of moth

Notascea brevispinula is a moth of the family Notodontidae. It is known only from Rio de Janeiro and Tijaca in Brazil.
