= Brachyglene fracta =

Scientific classification
- Kingdom: Animalia
- Phylum: Arthropoda
- Clade: Pancrustacea
- Class: Insecta
- Order: Lepidoptera
- Superfamily: Noctuoidea
- Family: Notodontidae
- Genus: Brachyglene
- Species: B. fracta

Binomial name
- Brachyglene fracta Miller, 2008

Species of moth

Brachyglene fracta is a moth of the family Notodontidae first described by James S. Miller in 2008. It is endemic to north-central Venezuela.

The length of the forewings is 15.5–16.5 mm for females.

== Bibliography ==
- Miller, James S. (2009). "Generic revision of the Dioptinae (Lepidoptera: Noctuoidea: Notodontidae) Part 1: Dioptini". Bulletin of the American Museum of Natural History. 321 (2): 1–676. hdl:2246/5978.
