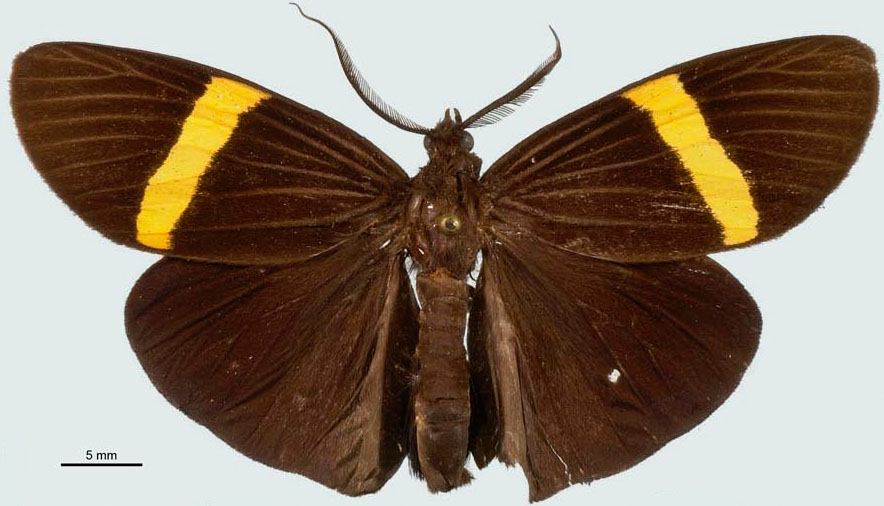

Scientific classification
- Kingdom: Animalia
- Phylum: Arthropoda
- Clade: Pancrustacea
- Class: Insecta
- Order: Lepidoptera
- Superfamily: Noctuoidea
- Family: Notodontidae
- Genus: Phavaraea
- Species: P. dilatata

Binomial name
- Phavaraea dilatata (Walker, 1854)

Synonyms
- Josia dilatata Walker, 1854; Scedros dilatata Walker, 1854; Milodora agis Boisduval, 1870

= Phavaraea dilatata =

Species of moth

Phavaraea dilatata is a moth of the family Notodontidae. It is found in South America, from French Guiana to southeastern Brazil.
