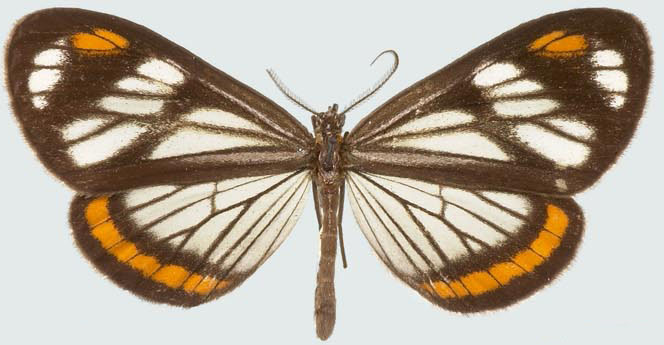
- Dioptis cyma, the type species of the tribe Dioptini
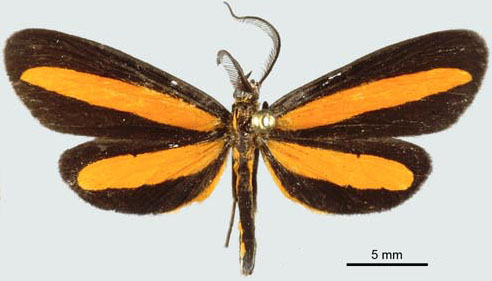
- Josia ligula, the type species of the tribe Josiini

Scientific classification
- Kingdom: Animalia
- Phylum: Arthropoda
- Clade: Pancrustacea
- Class: Insecta
- Order: Lepidoptera
- Superfamily: Noctuoidea
- Family: Notodontidae
- Subfamily: Dioptinae; Walker, 1862

Genera
- See text

= Dioptinae =

Subfamily of moths

Dioptinae is a subfamily of the moth family Notodontidae.

The Dioptinae are an almost exclusively neotropical group of day-flying moths.

== Taxonomy ==
The subfamily was formerly placed in a separate family (Dioptidae). Furthermore, the tribe Josiini has been treated as a family (Josiidae) by Piepers & Snellen in 1900 and as a subfamily (Josiinae) by Kiriakoff in 1950.

== Genera ==
- Tribe Josiini Miller & Otero, 1994
  - Caribojosia
  - Ephialtias
  - Getta
  - Josia
  - Lyces
  - Notascea
  - Phavaraea
  - Phintia
  - Polyptychia
  - Proutiella
  - Scea
- Tribe Dioptini Minet, 1983
  - Anticoreura
  - Argentala
  - Brachyglene
  - Cacolyces
  - Chrysoglossa
  - Cleptophasia
  - Dioptis
  - Dolophrosyne
  - Erbessa
  - Eremonidia
  - Eremonidiopsis
  - Euchontha
  - Hadesina
  - Isostyla
  - Momonipta
  - Monocreagra
  - Nebulosa
  - Oricia
  - Pareuchontha
  - Phaeochlaena
  - Phanoptis
  - Phryganidia
  - Pikroprion
  - Polypoetes
  - Pseudoricia
  - Sagittala
  - Scotura
  - Scoturopsis
  - Stenoplastis
  - Tithraustes
  - Xenomigia
  - Xenorma
  - Xenormicola
