= Scoturopsis coras =

Scientific classification
- Kingdom: Animalia
- Phylum: Arthropoda
- Clade: Pancrustacea
- Class: Insecta
- Order: Lepidoptera
- Superfamily: Noctuoidea
- Family: Notodontidae
- Genus: Scoturopsis
- Species: S. coras

Binomial name
- Scoturopsis coras (H. Druce, 1893)

Synonyms
- Trochiodes coras H. Druce, 1893; Stenoplastis biplaga Dognin, 1902

Species of moth

Scoturopsis coras is a moth of the family Notodontidae first described by Herbert Druce in 1893. It is found in Ecuador.

The larvae feed on Chusquea scandens.
