= Xenomigia nubilata =

Scientific classification
- Kingdom: Animalia
- Phylum: Arthropoda
- Clade: Pancrustacea
- Class: Insecta
- Order: Lepidoptera
- Superfamily: Noctuoidea
- Family: Notodontidae
- Genus: Xenomigia
- Species: X. nubilata

Binomial name
- Xenomigia nubilata (Dognin, 1912)

Synonyms
- Tithraustes nubilata Dognin, 1912

Species of moth

Xenomigia nubilata is a moth of the family Notodontidae. It is found in Colombia.

The length of the forewings is 18–18.5 mm (0.71–0.73 in).
