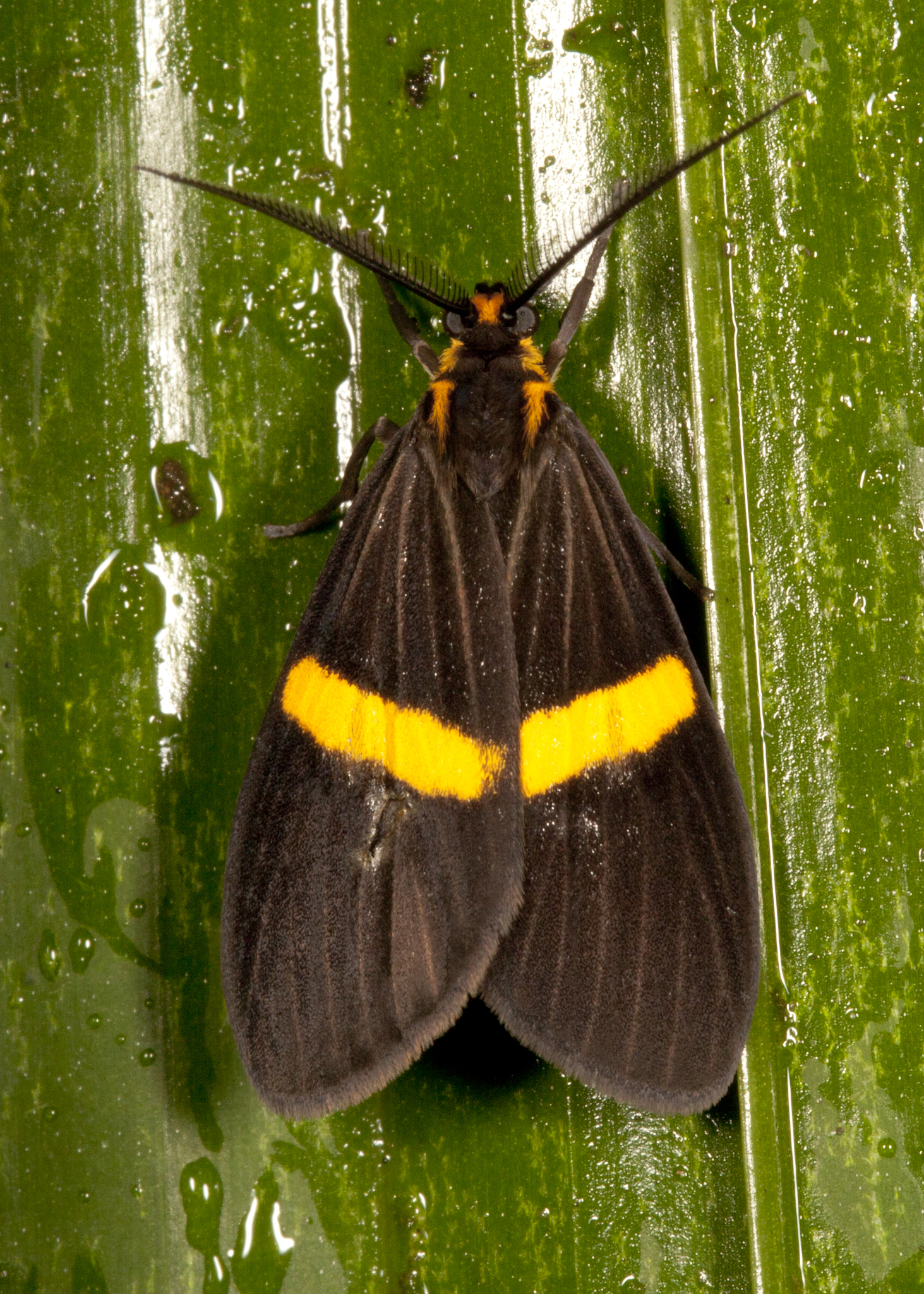

Scientific classification
- Kingdom: Animalia
- Phylum: Arthropoda
- Clade: Pancrustacea
- Class: Insecta
- Order: Lepidoptera
- Superfamily: Noctuoidea
- Family: Notodontidae
- Genus: Brachyglene
- Species: B. schausi

Binomial name
- Brachyglene schausi L. B. Prout, 1918

= Brachyglene schausi =

Species of moth

Brachyglene schausi is a species of moth in the family Notodontidae that was first described by Louis Beethoven Prout in 1918. It is found in Colombia, Costa Rica, Nicaragua and Mexico.
