= Dolophrosyne sinuosa =

Scientific classification
- Kingdom: Animalia
- Phylum: Arthropoda
- Clade: Pancrustacea
- Class: Insecta
- Order: Lepidoptera
- Superfamily: Noctuoidea
- Family: Notodontidae
- Genus: Dolophrosyne
- Species: D. sinuosa

Binomial name
- Dolophrosyne sinuosa Miller, 2008

Species of moth

Dolophrosyne sinuosa is a moth of the family Notodontidae first described by James S. Miller in 2008. It is found in the Cosnipata Valley east of Cuzco in Peru.

The length of the forewings is 11–11.5 mm for males.
