= Brachyglene bracteola =

Scientific classification
- Kingdom: Animalia
- Phylum: Arthropoda
- Clade: Pancrustacea
- Class: Insecta
- Order: Lepidoptera
- Superfamily: Noctuoidea
- Family: Notodontidae
- Genus: Brachyglene
- Species: B. bracteola

Binomial name
- Brachyglene bracteola (Geyer, 1832)

Synonyms
- Phaeochlaena bracteola Geyer, 1832; Brachyglene circumlita Prout, 1918; Brachyglene dilatata Hering, 1925; Brachyglene elongata Hering, 1925; Phaeochlaena privata Walker, 1864

Species of moth

Brachyglene bracteola is a moth of the family Notodontidae first described by Carl Geyer in 1832. It is found from Venezuela east to Ceará, Brazil, and south at least as far as Rio de Janeiro.

Females show extensive wing-pattern variation.
