= Phanoptis fatidica =

Scientific classification
- Domain: Eukaryota
- Kingdom: Animalia
- Phylum: Arthropoda
- Class: Insecta
- Order: Lepidoptera
- Superfamily: Noctuoidea
- Family: Notodontidae
- Genus: Phanoptis
- Species: P. fatidica

Binomial name
- Phanoptis fatidica (Dognin, 1910)

Synonyms
- Phelloe fatidica Dognin, 1910

Species of moth

Phanoptis fatidica is a moth of the family Notodontidae. It is found from Venezuela west to Colombia, then south along the eastern slope of the Andes to central Peru.
