= Pareuchontha albimargo =

Scientific classification
- Kingdom: Animalia
- Phylum: Arthropoda
- Clade: Pancrustacea
- Class: Insecta
- Order: Lepidoptera
- Superfamily: Noctuoidea
- Family: Notodontidae
- Genus: Pareuchontha
- Species: P. albimargo

Binomial name
- Pareuchontha albimargo Miller, 1989

Species of moth

Pareuchontha albimargo is a moth of the family Notodontidae. It is found in Ecuador and Peru.
