= Scoturopsis seitzi =

Scientific classification
- Kingdom: Animalia
- Phylum: Arthropoda
- Clade: Pancrustacea
- Class: Insecta
- Order: Lepidoptera
- Superfamily: Noctuoidea
- Family: Notodontidae
- Genus: Scoturopsis
- Species: S. seitzi

Binomial name
- Scoturopsis seitzi Hering, 1925

Species of moth

"Scoturopsis" seitzi is a moth of the family Notodontidae first described by Hering in 1925. It is found in Bolivia.
