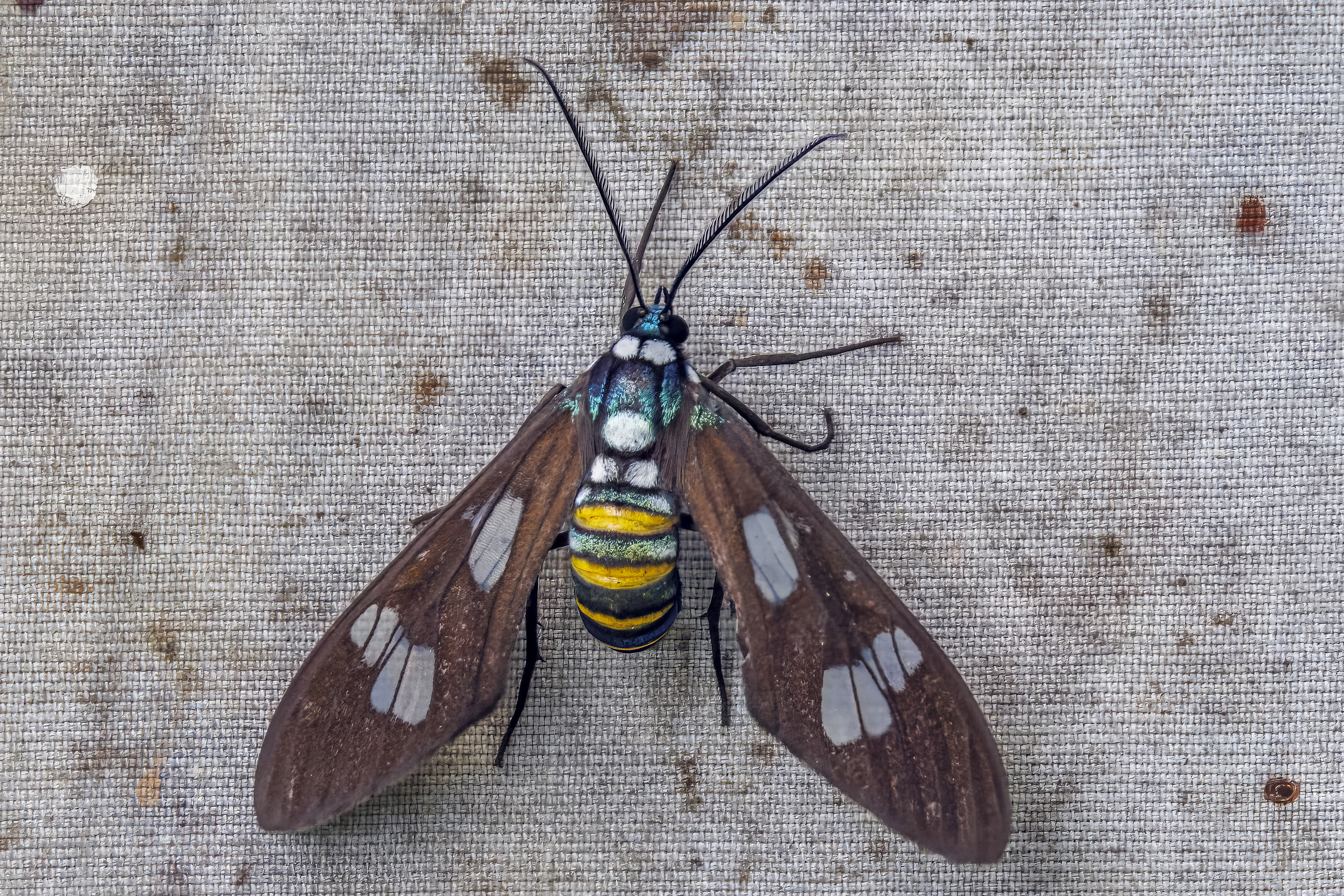
- In Ecuador

Scientific classification
- Kingdom: Animalia
- Phylum: Arthropoda
- Clade: Pancrustacea
- Class: Insecta
- Order: Lepidoptera
- Superfamily: Noctuoidea
- Family: Erebidae
- Subfamily: Arctiinae
- Genus: Phaio
- Species: P. acquiguttata

Binomial name
- Phaio acquiguttata Dognin, 1909

= Phaio acquiguttata =

Species of moth

Phaio acquiguttata is a moth of the subfamily Arctiinae. It was described by Paul Dognin in 1909. It is found in Colombia.
