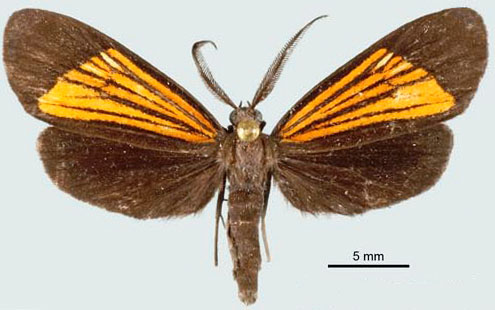

Scientific classification
- Kingdom: Animalia
- Phylum: Arthropoda
- Clade: Pancrustacea
- Class: Insecta
- Order: Lepidoptera
- Superfamily: Noctuoidea
- Family: Notodontidae
- Genus: Notascea
- Species: N. obliquaria

Binomial name
- Notascea obliquaria (Warren, 1906)

Synonyms
- Scea obliquaria Warren, 1906

= Notascea obliquaria =

Species of moth

Notascea obliquaria is a moth of the family Notodontidae. It is found in Paraguay.

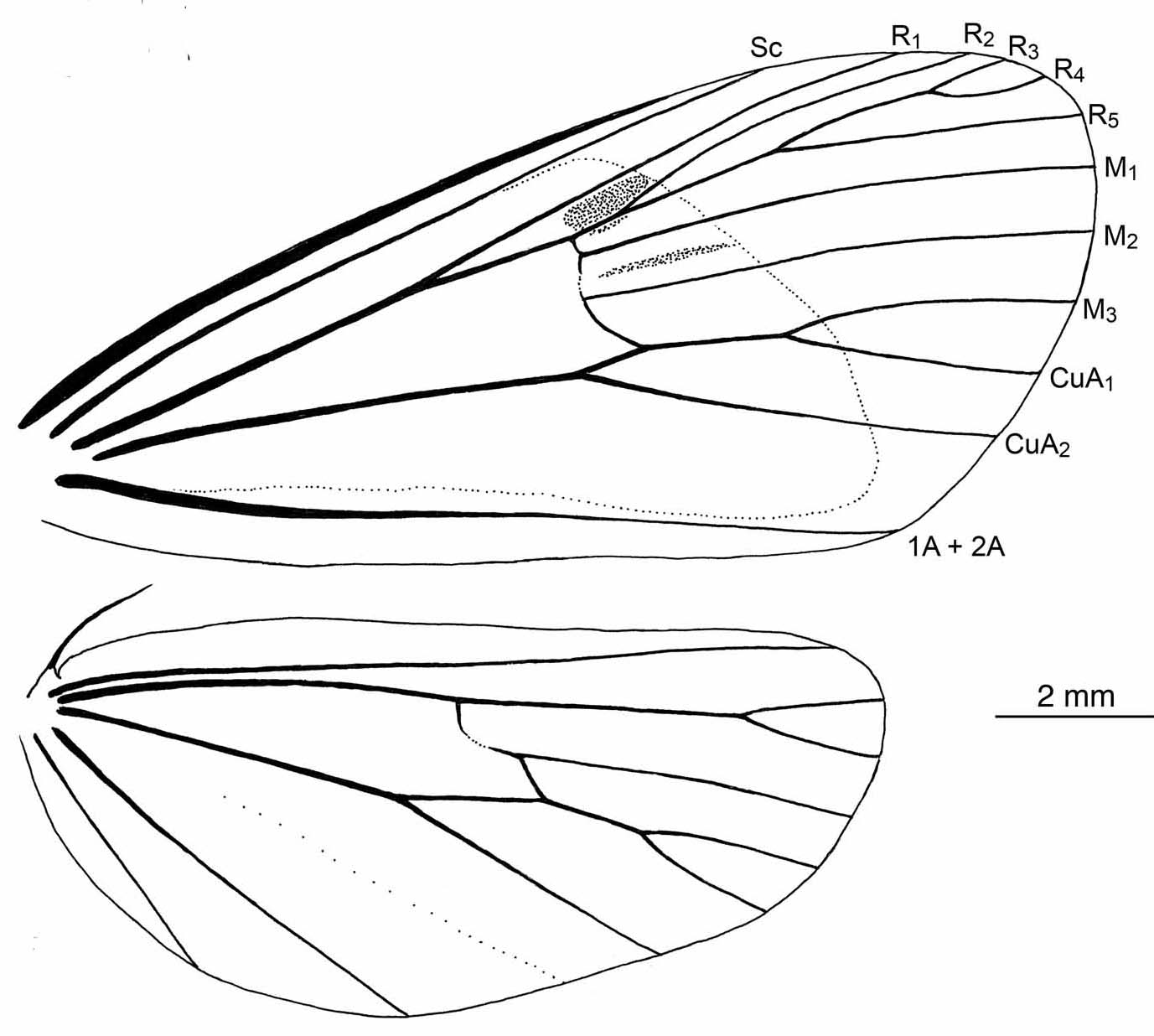
Wing venation
