= Xenomigia pinasi =

Scientific classification
- Kingdom: Animalia
- Phylum: Arthropoda
- Clade: Pancrustacea
- Class: Insecta
- Order: Lepidoptera
- Superfamily: Noctuoidea
- Family: Notodontidae
- Genus: Xenomigia
- Species: X. pinasi

Binomial name
- Xenomigia pinasi Miller, 2008

Species of moth

Xenomigia pinasi is a moth of the family Notodontidae. It is found along the eastern slope of the Ecuadorian Andes.

The length of the forewings is 19-19.5 mm for males and 21.5 mm for females.

== Etymology ==
The species is named in honor of Francisco Pinas, a collector of Ecuadorian moths.
