= Brachyglene thirmida =

Scientific classification
- Kingdom: Animalia
- Phylum: Arthropoda
- Clade: Pancrustacea
- Class: Insecta
- Order: Lepidoptera
- Superfamily: Noctuoidea
- Family: Notodontidae
- Genus: Brachyglene
- Species: B. thirmida

Binomial name
- Brachyglene thirmida Hering, 1925

Species of moth

"Brachyglene" thirmida is a moth of the family Notodontidae first described by Hering in 1925. It is found in Bolivia.

Adults resemble Scea species.
