= Phaio geminiguttata =

Scientific classification
- Kingdom: Animalia
- Phylum: Arthropoda
- Clade: Pancrustacea
- Class: Insecta
- Order: Lepidoptera
- Superfamily: Noctuoidea
- Family: Erebidae
- Subfamily: Arctiinae
- Genus: Phaio
- Species: P. geminiguttata

Binomial name
- Phaio geminiguttata Dognin, 1911

Species of moth

Phaio geminiguttata is a moth of the subfamily Arctiinae. It was described by Paul Dognin in 1911. It is found in Colombia.
