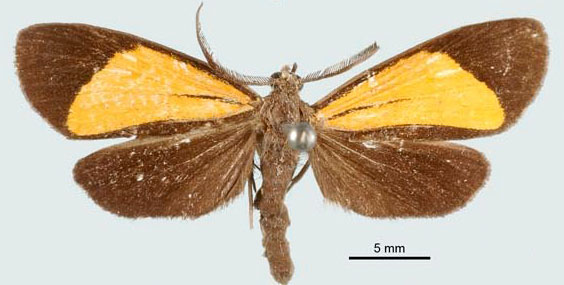

Scientific classification
- Kingdom: Animalia
- Phylum: Arthropoda
- Clade: Pancrustacea
- Class: Insecta
- Order: Lepidoptera
- Superfamily: Noctuoidea
- Family: Notodontidae
- Genus: Notascea
- Species: N. nudata

Binomial name
- Notascea nudata (Hering, 1925)

Synonyms
- Scea nudata Hering, 1925

= Notascea nudata =

Species of moth

Notascea nudata is a moth of the family Notodontidae. It is known only from Brazil.
