= Phanoptis taxila =

Scientific classification
- Domain: Eukaryota
- Kingdom: Animalia
- Phylum: Arthropoda
- Class: Insecta
- Order: Lepidoptera
- Superfamily: Noctuoidea
- Family: Notodontidae
- Genus: Phanoptis
- Species: P. taxila

Binomial name
- Phanoptis taxila H. Druce, 1907

Species of moth

Phanoptis taxila is a moth of the family Notodontidae first described by Herbert Druce in 1907. It is found in Colombia.
