= Dolophrosyne =

Scientific classification
- Kingdom: Animalia
- Phylum: Arthropoda
- Clade: Pancrustacea
- Class: Insecta
- Order: Lepidoptera
- Superfamily: Noctuoidea
- Family: Notodontidae
- Tribe: Dioptini
- Genus: Dolophrosyne; Prout, 1918

Synonyms
- Euscoturopsis Bryk, 1930

Genus of moths

Dolophrosyne is a genus of moths of the family Notodontidae. It consists of the following species:

- Dolophrosyne coniades (Druce, 1893)
- Dolophrosyne elongata (Hering, 1925)
- Dolophrosyne mirax Prout, 1918
- Dolophrosyne sinuosa Miller, 2008
