= Pareuchontha olibra =

Scientific classification
- Kingdom: Animalia
- Phylum: Arthropoda
- Clade: Pancrustacea
- Class: Insecta
- Order: Lepidoptera
- Superfamily: Noctuoidea
- Family: Notodontidae
- Genus: Pareuchontha
- Species: P. olibra

Binomial name
- Pareuchontha olibra Miller, 2008

Species of moth

Pareuchontha olibra is a moth of the family Notodontidae. It is found along eastern slope of the Ecuadorian Andes.

The length of the forewings is about 14 mm for males.
