= Brachyglene crocearia =

Scientific classification
- Kingdom: Animalia
- Phylum: Arthropoda
- Clade: Pancrustacea
- Class: Insecta
- Order: Lepidoptera
- Superfamily: Noctuoidea
- Family: Notodontidae
- Genus: Brachyglene
- Species: B. crocearia

Binomial name
- Brachyglene crocearia (Schaus, 1912)

Synonyms
- Phaeochlaena crocearia Schaus, 1912

Species of moth

Brachyglene crocearia is a moth of the family Notodontidae first described by William Schaus in 1912. It is found in Costa Rica, Honduras and Guatemala.
