= Isostyla =

Scientific classification
- Kingdom: Animalia
- Phylum: Arthropoda
- Clade: Pancrustacea
- Class: Insecta
- Order: Lepidoptera
- Superfamily: Noctuoidea
- Family: Notodontidae
- Tribe: Dioptini
- Genus: Isostyla; Prout, 1918

Genus of moths

Isostyla is a genus of moths of the family Notodontidae. It consists of the following species:

- Isostyla biquadrata Prout, 1918
- Isostyla ithomeina (Butler, 1872)
- Isostyla picata (Warren, 1900)
- Isostyla purefacta Prout, 1918
- Isostyla zetila (Boisduval, 1870)
