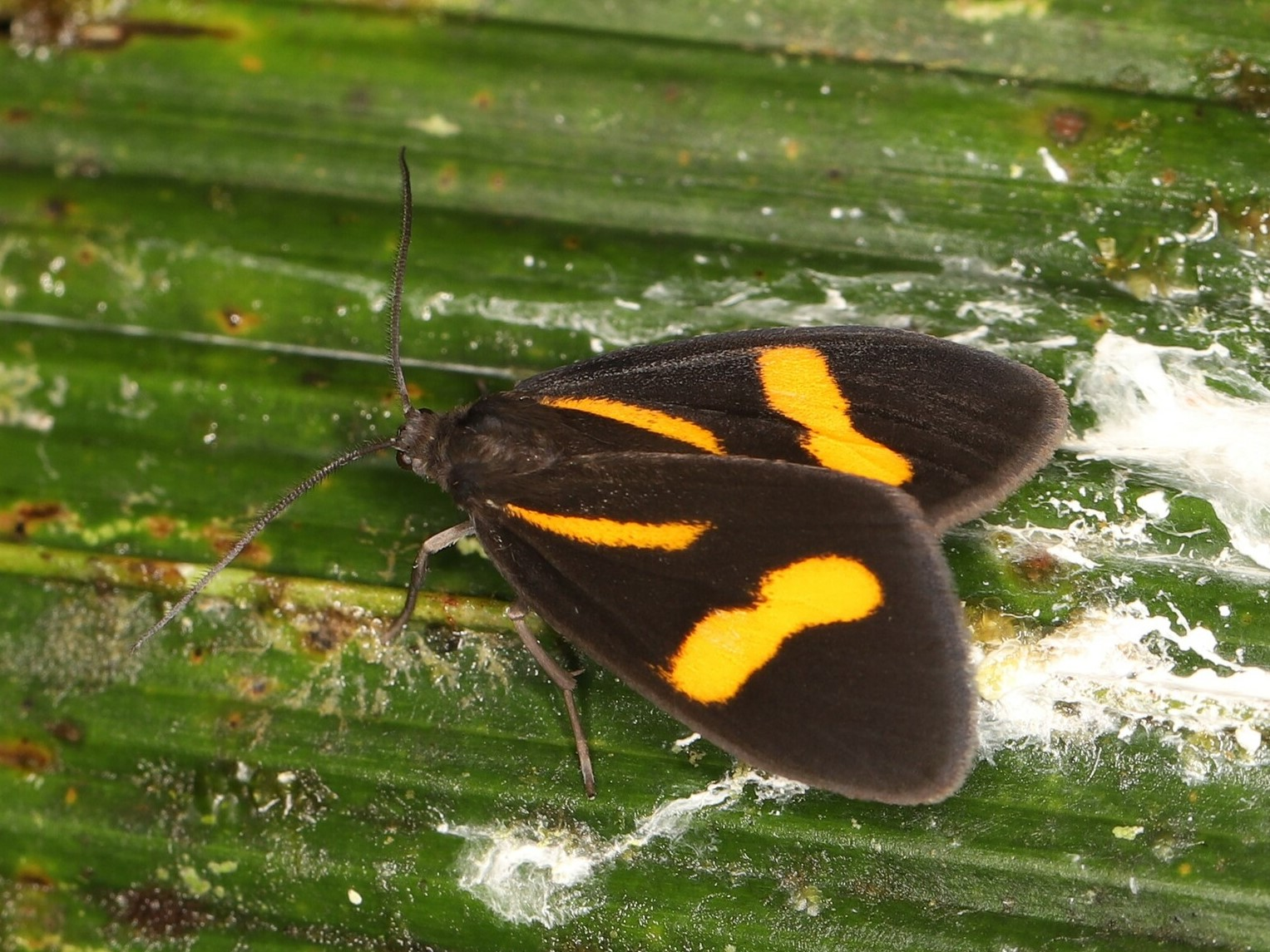

Scientific classification
- Kingdom: Animalia
- Phylum: Arthropoda
- Clade: Pancrustacea
- Class: Insecta
- Order: Lepidoptera
- Superfamily: Noctuoidea
- Family: Notodontidae
- Genus: Stenoplastis
- Species: S. decorata

Binomial name
- Stenoplastis decorata (Dognin, 1909)

Synonyms
- Polypoetes decorata Dognin, 1909

= Stenoplastis decorata =

Species of moth

Stenoplastis decorata is a species of moth in the family Notodontidae. It is found in Colombia.
