= Phaio longipennis =

Scientific classification
- Kingdom: Animalia
- Phylum: Arthropoda
- Clade: Pancrustacea
- Class: Insecta
- Order: Lepidoptera
- Superfamily: Noctuoidea
- Family: Erebidae
- Subfamily: Arctiinae
- Genus: Phaio
- Species: P. longipennis

Binomial name
- Phaio longipennis Neumoegen, 1894

Synonyms
- Phaio longipenuis Neumoegen, 1894

Species of moth

Phaio longipennis is a moth of the subfamily Arctiinae. It was described by Berthold Neumoegen in 1894. It is found on Cuba. The specific name was spelled "longipenuis" in the original 1894 description, and emended to "longipennis" in 1898; under ICZN Article 33.2.3.1 the emended spelling is to be preserved.
