= Pseudoricia ovisigna =

Scientific classification
- Kingdom: Animalia
- Phylum: Arthropoda
- Clade: Pancrustacea
- Class: Insecta
- Order: Lepidoptera
- Superfamily: Noctuoidea
- Family: Notodontidae
- Genus: Pseudoricia
- Species: P. ovisigna

Binomial name
- Pseudoricia ovisigna (L. B. Prout, 1918)

Synonyms
- Scotura ovisigna Prout, 1918

Species of moth

Pseudoricia ovisigna is a moth of the family Notodontidae. It is found in Colombia and Ecuador.

The larvae feed on Rinorea apiculata.
