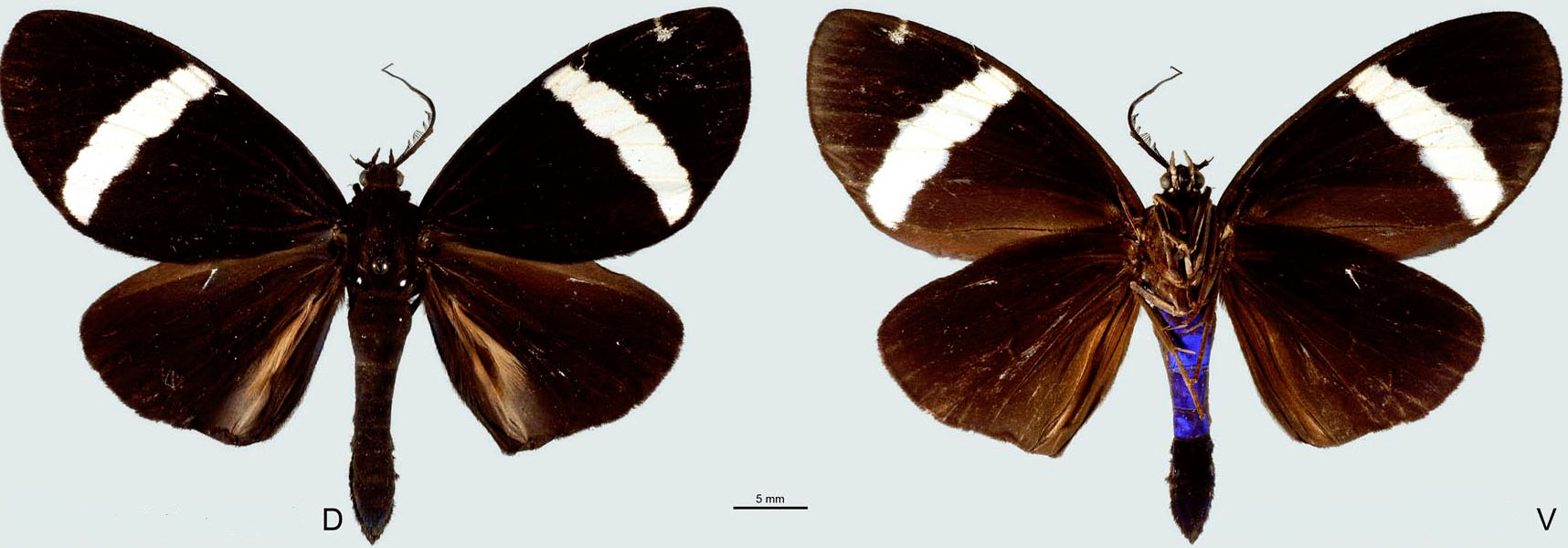

Scientific classification
- Kingdom: Animalia
- Phylum: Arthropoda
- Clade: Pancrustacea
- Class: Insecta
- Order: Lepidoptera
- Superfamily: Noctuoidea
- Family: Notodontidae
- Genus: Phavaraea
- Species: P. poliana

Binomial name
- Phavaraea poliana (H. Druce, 1893)

Synonyms
- Eucyane poliana H. Druce, 1893

= Phavaraea poliana =

Species of moth

Phavaraea poliana is a moth of the family Notodontidae first described by Herbert Druce in 1893. It is found in Brazil, Guyana and the lower Amazon.
