= Xenomigia cosanga =

Scientific classification
- Kingdom: Animalia
- Phylum: Arthropoda
- Clade: Pancrustacea
- Class: Insecta
- Order: Lepidoptera
- Superfamily: Noctuoidea
- Family: Notodontidae
- Genus: Xenomigia
- Species: X. cosanga

Binomial name
- Xenomigia cosanga Miller, 2011

Species of moth

Xenomigia cosanga is a moth of the family Notodontidae. It is found in north-eastern Ecuador.

The length of the forewings is 15-15.5 mm.

== Etymology ==
The species is named for the town of Cosanga in Ecuador.
