= Pareuchontha albipes =

Scientific classification
- Kingdom: Animalia
- Phylum: Arthropoda
- Clade: Pancrustacea
- Class: Insecta
- Order: Lepidoptera
- Superfamily: Noctuoidea
- Family: Notodontidae
- Genus: Pareuchontha
- Species: P. albipes

Binomial name
- Pareuchontha albipes (Maassen, 1890)

Synonyms
- Cymopsis albipes Maassen, 1890; Pareuchontha wormsi Miller, 1989

Species of moth

Pareuchontha albipes is a moth of the family Notodontidae. It is found in Ecuador.
