= Brachyglene =

Scientific classification
- Kingdom: Animalia
- Phylum: Arthropoda
- Clade: Pancrustacea
- Class: Insecta
- Order: Lepidoptera
- Superfamily: Noctuoidea
- Family: Notodontidae
- Tribe: Dioptini
- Genus: Brachyglene; Herrich-Schaffer 1855

Genus of moths

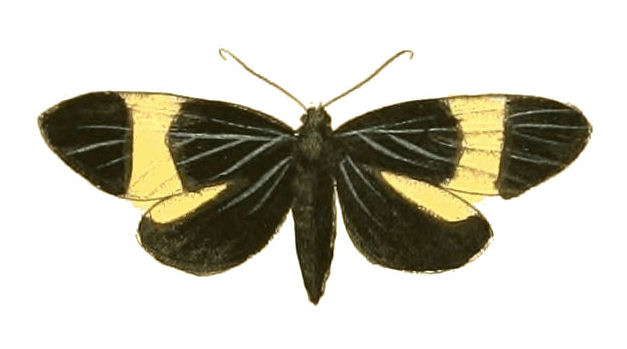
Brachyglene caenea

Brachyglene is a genus of moths of the family Notodontidae. It consists of the following species:

- Brachyglene albicephala Miller, 2008
- Brachyglene bracteola (Geyer, 1832)
- Brachyglene caenea (Drury, 1782)
- Brachyglene crocearia (Schaus, 1912)
- Brachyglene fracta Miller, 2008
- Brachyglene patinata Prout, 1918
- Brachyglene schausi Prout, 1918
- Brachyglene subtilis (C. and R. Felder, 1874)
- Brachyglene superbior (Strand, 1912)
- Brachyglene thirmida Hering, 1925
