= Stenoplastis flavibasis =

Scientific classification
- Kingdom: Animalia
- Phylum: Arthropoda
- Clade: Pancrustacea
- Class: Insecta
- Order: Lepidoptera
- Superfamily: Noctuoidea
- Family: Notodontidae
- Genus: Stenoplastis
- Species: S. flavibasis

Binomial name
- Stenoplastis flavibasis Hering, 1925

Species of moth

"Stenoplastis" flavibasis is a moth of the family Notodontidae. It is found in Peru.

== Taxonomy ==
The species probably does not belong in Stenoplastis, but has not been placed in another genus yet.
