= Isostyla zetila =

Scientific classification
- Kingdom: Animalia
- Phylum: Arthropoda
- Clade: Pancrustacea
- Class: Insecta
- Order: Lepidoptera
- Superfamily: Noctuoidea
- Family: Notodontidae
- Genus: Isostyla
- Species: I. zetila

Binomial name
- Isostyla zetila (Boisduval, 1870)

Synonyms
- Epilaus zetila Boisduval, 1870; Hyrmina nubila Schaus, 1912; Dioptis symoides Strand, 1914

Species of moth

Isostyla zetila is a moth of the family Notodontidae first described by Jean Baptiste Boisduval in 1870. It is found from Costa Rica north to Guatemala.
