= Xenomigia wilmeri =

Scientific classification
- Kingdom: Animalia
- Phylum: Arthropoda
- Clade: Pancrustacea
- Class: Insecta
- Order: Lepidoptera
- Superfamily: Noctuoidea
- Family: Notodontidae
- Genus: Xenomigia
- Species: X. wilmeri

Binomial name
- Xenomigia wilmeri Miller, 2011

Species of moth

Xenomigia wilmeri is a moth of the family Notodontidae first described by James S. Miller in 2011. It is found in north-eastern Ecuador.

The length of the forewings is 14–18 mm.

The larvae have been reared on Chusquea cf. scandens.
