= Brachyglene albicephala =

Scientific classification
- Kingdom: Animalia
- Phylum: Arthropoda
- Clade: Pancrustacea
- Class: Insecta
- Order: Lepidoptera
- Superfamily: Noctuoidea
- Family: Notodontidae
- Genus: Brachyglene
- Species: B. albicephala

Binomial name
- Brachyglene albicephala Miller, 2008

Species of moth

Brachyglene albicephala is a moth of the family Notodontidae first described by James S. Miller in 2008. It is endemic to the northern half of Costa Rica.

The length of the forewings is 13–16 mm for males and 16.5–18 mm for females.

The larvae feed on Bauhinia guianensis.

== Etymology ==
The species name is said to be derived from the Latin words albi and cephalus and refers to the white head region of this species. In classical Latin, albus (masculine), alba (feminine) or album (neuter) is the proper word for "white". Caput is the actual word for "head" in classical Latin, while in ancient Greek kephalē (κεφαλή) was used for "head". Kephalos (Κέφαλος) was the first name of various Greek mythological and historical figures that was rendered in Latin as Cephalus.
