= Phanoptis miltorrhabda =

Scientific classification
- Kingdom: Animalia
- Phylum: Arthropoda
- Clade: Pancrustacea
- Class: Insecta
- Order: Lepidoptera
- Superfamily: Noctuoidea
- Family: Notodontidae
- Genus: Phanoptis
- Species: P. miltorrhabda

Binomial name
- Phanoptis miltorrhabda L. B. Prout, 1922

Species of moth

Phanoptis miltorrhabda is a moth of the family Notodontidae. It is found in Peru and Bolivia.

Adults have red markings and are possibly mimics of the butterfly Abananote erinome.

== Notes ==
- Miller, James S. (2009). "Generic revision of the Dioptinae (Lepidoptera: Noctuoidea: Notodontidae) Part 1: Dioptini". Bulletin of the American Museum of Natural History. 321 (2): 1–676. doi:10.1206/321.1. hdl:2246/5978. S2CID 86824329.
