= Pikroprion =

Scientific classification
- Kingdom: Animalia
- Phylum: Arthropoda
- Clade: Pancrustacea
- Class: Insecta
- Order: Lepidoptera
- Superfamily: Noctuoidea
- Family: Notodontidae
- Tribe: Dioptini
- Genus: Pikroprion; J. S. Miller, 2009
- Species: P. sullivani

Binomial name
- Pikroprion sullivani J. S. Miller, 2009

Genus of moths

Pikroprion is a genus of moths of the family Notodontidae. It consists of only one species, Pikroprion sullivani, which is endemic to the Choco habitat along the western slopes of the Andes in Ecuador and Colombia.

The length of the forewings is 14.5–16 mm for males and 15.5–17 mm for females.
