= Anticoreura =

Scientific classification
- Kingdom: Animalia
- Phylum: Arthropoda
- Clade: Pancrustacea
- Class: Insecta
- Order: Lepidoptera
- Superfamily: Noctuoidea
- Family: Notodontidae
- Tribe: Dioptini
- Genus: Anticoreura; Prout, 1918
- Species: A. salmoni

Binomial name
- Anticoreura salmoni (H. Druce, 1885)

Synonyms
- Coreura salmoni H. Druce, 1885

Genus of moths

Anticoreura is a monotypic moth genus of the family Notodontidae described by Prout in 1918. Its one species, Anticoreura salmoni, first described by Herbert Druce in 1885, is found in Colombia.
