= Stenoplastis =

Scientific classification
- Kingdom: Animalia
- Phylum: Arthropoda
- Clade: Pancrustacea
- Class: Insecta
- Order: Lepidoptera
- Superfamily: Noctuoidea
- Family: Notodontidae
- Tribe: Dioptini
- Genus: Stenoplastis; Felder, 1874

Genus of moths

Stenoplastis is a genus of moths of the family Notodontidae. It consists of the following species:

- Stenoplastis carderi (Druce, 1899)
- Stenoplastis decorata Dognin, 1909
- Stenoplastis dyeri Miller, 2008
- Stenoplastis flavibasis Hering, 1925
- Stenoplastis flavinigra (Dognin, 1910)
- Stenoplastis satyroides C. and R. Felder, 1874
