= Phaio salmoni =

Scientific classification
- Kingdom: Animalia
- Phylum: Arthropoda
- Clade: Pancrustacea
- Class: Insecta
- Order: Lepidoptera
- Superfamily: Noctuoidea
- Family: Erebidae
- Subfamily: Arctiinae
- Genus: Phaio
- Species: P. salmoni

Binomial name
- Phaio salmoni H. Druce, 1883

Species of moth

Phaio salmoni is a moth of the subfamily Arctiinae. It was described by Herbert Druce in 1883. It is found in Colombia.
