= Eremonidia =

Scientific classification
- Kingdom: Animalia
- Phylum: Arthropoda
- Clade: Pancrustacea
- Class: Insecta
- Order: Lepidoptera
- Superfamily: Noctuoidea
- Family: Notodontidae
- Tribe: Dioptini
- Genus: Eremonidia; Rawlins & J. S. Miller, 2008
- Species: E. mirifica

Binomial name
- Eremonidia mirifica Rawlins and J. S. Miller, 2008

Genus of moths

Eremonidia is a monotypic moth genus of the family Notodontidae. Its only species, Eremonidia mirifica, is known from two mountain ranges in the south-western part of the Dominican Republic. Both the genus and species were first described by John E. Rawlins and James S. Miller in 2008.
