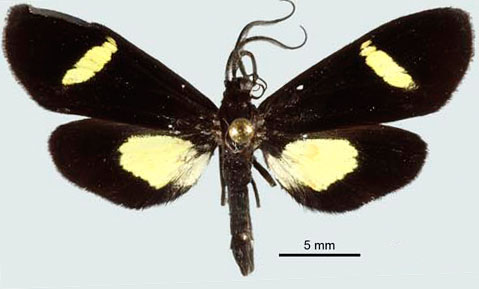

Scientific classification
- Kingdom: Animalia
- Phylum: Arthropoda
- Clade: Pancrustacea
- Class: Insecta
- Order: Lepidoptera
- Superfamily: Noctuoidea
- Family: Notodontidae
- Genus: Phintia
- Species: P. podarce

Binomial name
- Phintia podarce Walker, 1854

Synonyms
- Phintia cercostis Walker, 1854; Josia podarce (Walker, 1854)

= Phintia podarce =

Species of insect

Phintia podarce is a moth of the family Notodontidae. It is found from the lower Amazon to the Andean foothills of Peru.
