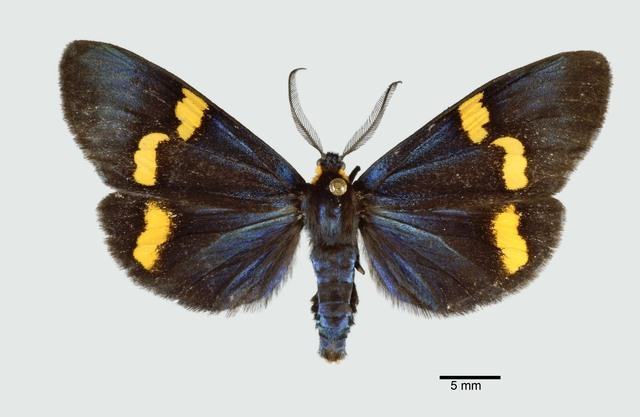

Scientific classification
- Kingdom: Animalia
- Phylum: Arthropoda
- Clade: Pancrustacea
- Class: Insecta
- Order: Lepidoptera
- Superfamily: Noctuoidea
- Family: Notodontidae
- Genus: Caribojosia; Rawlins & J. S. Miller, 2008
- Species: C. youngi

Binomial name
- Caribojosia youngi Rawlins & J. S. Miller, 2008

= Caribojosia =

Genus of moths

Caribojosia is a monotypic moth genus in the family Notodontidae. Its only species, Caribojosia youngi, is found in the Dominican Republic and adjacent Haiti. Both the genus and species were first described by John E. Rawlins and James S. Miller in 2008.

The larvae feed on mature leaves of Passiflora sexflora.
