= Xenomigia concinna =

Scientific classification
- Kingdom: Animalia
- Phylum: Arthropoda
- Clade: Pancrustacea
- Class: Insecta
- Order: Lepidoptera
- Superfamily: Noctuoidea
- Family: Notodontidae
- Genus: Xenomigia
- Species: X. concinna

Binomial name
- Xenomigia concinna Dognin, 1911

Species of moth

Xenomigia concinna is a moth of the family Notodontidae. It is found in Colombia.

The length of the forewings is about 17 mm.
