= Momonipta =

Scientific classification
- Kingdom: Animalia
- Phylum: Arthropoda
- Clade: Pancrustacea
- Class: Insecta
- Order: Lepidoptera
- Superfamily: Noctuoidea
- Family: Notodontidae
- Tribe: Dioptini
- Genus: Momonipta; Warren, 1897

Genus of moths

Momonipta is a genus of moths of the family Notodontidae. It consists of the following species:

- Momonipta albiplaga Warren, 1897
- Momonipta onorei Miller, 2008
