= Ovia (disambiguation) =

Ovia is a genus of spiders native to Asia.

Ovia may also refer to:

- Ovia, a deity of the Edo people in Nigeria
- Ovia River, a river in Nigeria also known as Osse
- Erbessa ovia, a species of moth native to South America
- Ovia North-East, a Local Government Area in Edo State, Nigeria
- Ovia South-West, a Local Government Area in Edo State, Nigeria
- Ovia Olo, a village in Marowijne District, Suriname
- Ovia-Osese Festival, an annual festival of the Ogori people in Nigeria
- Ovia (name), people with Ovia as their given name or surname
