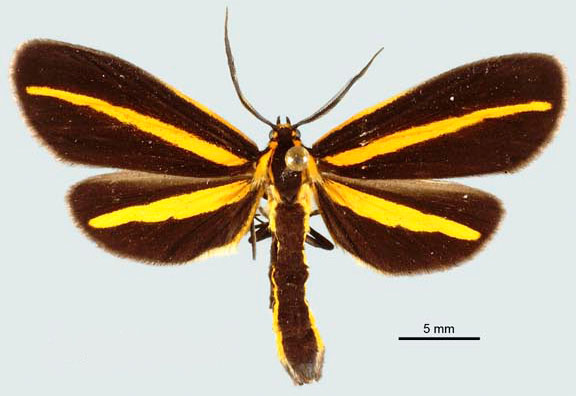

Scientific classification
- Kingdom: Animalia
- Phylum: Arthropoda
- Clade: Pancrustacea
- Class: Insecta
- Order: Lepidoptera
- Superfamily: Noctuoidea
- Family: Notodontidae
- Genus: Josia
- Species: J. radians

Binomial name
- Josia radians Warren, 1905

= Josia radians =

Species of moth

Josia radians is a moth of the family Notodontidae. It is found in Amazonian Colombia and Ecuador.

Larvae have been recorded on Passiflora capsularis, Passiflora rubra, Passiflora cuneata and Passiflora manicata.
