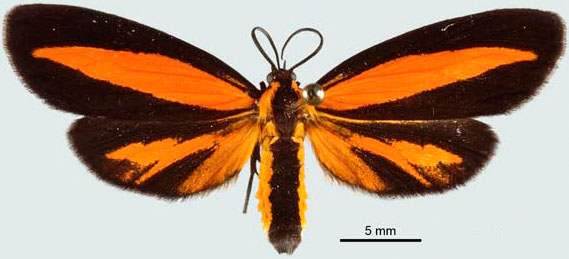

Scientific classification
- Kingdom: Animalia
- Phylum: Arthropoda
- Clade: Pancrustacea
- Class: Insecta
- Order: Lepidoptera
- Superfamily: Noctuoidea
- Family: Notodontidae
- Genus: Josia
- Species: J. aurifusa

Binomial name
- Josia aurifusa Walker, 1854

Synonyms
- Josia glycera Druce, 1885; Josia conifera Warren, 1905

= Josia aurifusa =

Species of moth

Josia aurifusa is a moth of the family Notodontidae. It is endemic to Venezuela.

Larvae have been recorded on Passiflora rubra and Passiflora capsularis.
