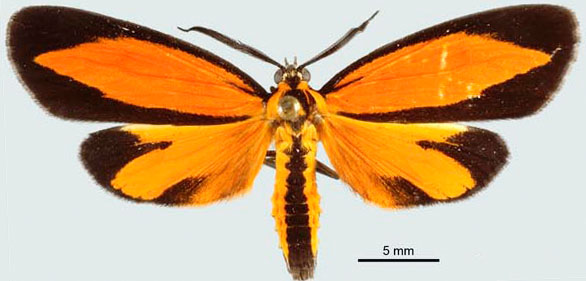

Scientific classification
- Kingdom: Animalia
- Phylum: Arthropoda
- Clade: Pancrustacea
- Class: Insecta
- Order: Lepidoptera
- Superfamily: Noctuoidea
- Family: Notodontidae
- Genus: Josia
- Species: J. turgida

Binomial name
- Josia turgida Warren, 1905

= Josia turgida =

Species of moth

Josia turgida is a moth of the family Notodontidae. It is found in Venezuela and possibly Colombia.

Larvae have been reared on Passiflora capsularis and Passiflora rubra.
