= Erbessa albilinea =

Scientific classification
- Kingdom: Animalia
- Phylum: Arthropoda
- Clade: Pancrustacea
- Class: Insecta
- Order: Lepidoptera
- Superfamily: Noctuoidea
- Family: Notodontidae
- Genus: Erbessa
- Species: E. albilinea

Binomial name
- Erbessa albilinea Miller, 2008

Species of moth

Erbessa albilinea is a moth of the family Notodontidae first described by James S. Miller in 2008. The length of the forewings is 18.5–21 mm for males and 21–23 mm for females. It has a black-brown forewing with a diagonal lemon-yellow stripe, glossy aquamarine or turquoise blue hingwings, and a narrow white stripe running through the pleurons. It is endemic to the Cordillera Central mountain range in Costa Rica. It is known from an elevation of 700 m (2,300 ft).

== Taxonomy ==
Erbessa albilinea was formally described by the American entomologist James S. Miller in 2008 based on a male collected from Guanacaste in Costa Rica. Its specific epithet is derived from the Latin words meaning "white line", in reference to the white abdominal line that helps distinguish it from the closely related E. lindigii.

== Description ==
The length of the forewings is 18.5–21 mm for males and 21–23 mm for females. It is a colorful species that can be easily distinguished from most other Erbessa. The black-brown forewing has a diagonal lemon-yellow stripe running from the subcosta to the tornus. The underside of the forewing is paler and has a broader stripe. The hindwing is a bright, glossy aquamarine or turquoise blue, with a black-brown border along the edge of the wing. The underside of the hindwing is black-brown with a slight metallic blue-green hue. It can be told apart from the similar Getta tica by the presence of a lachrymiform orange-yellow spot at the tip of the hindwing. It is extremely similar to E. lindigii, but can be told apart from that species by a narrow white stripe running through the pleurons on the sides of the abdomen and the paler, less purplish hindwing.

Caterpillars have a contrasting tiger-stripe pattern, running over almost the entire length of the body.

== Distribution and habitat ==
Erbessa albilinea is endemic to Costa Rica, where it inhabits the Caribbean versant of the Cordillera Central mountain range from the Orosí Volcano to the Barva Volcano. It is known from an elevation of 700 m (2,300 ft). Specimens of Erbessa historically identified as E. lindigii from north of this species' range in Honduras, Guatemala, and Belize may turn out to represent this species on reexamination, but are more likely to be a currently undescribed species.

Caterpillars feed on Miconia dolichopoda and Conostegia subcrustulata.
