= C. O. Idahosa =

Nigerian jurist and former Chief Justice of Edo State

Justice Cromwell Osamwonyi Idahosa

Chief Judge of Edo State, Nigeria
- In office 2010 – 26 January 2017
- Appointed by: Adams Oshiomhole
- Preceded by: Michael I. Edokpayi
- Succeeded by: Justice Esther Edigin

Personal details
- Born: 25 January 1952 (age 74) Ovia

Justice Cromwell Osamwonyi Idahosa is a Nigerian jurist who served as the Chief Judge of Edo State from 2010 until his retirement in January 2017. Educated in Benin City and at the University of Ife, he was called to the Nigerian bar in 1976.

== Early life and education ==
Cromwell Osamwonyi Idahosa was born on 25 January 1952 and hails from Ovia South West Local Government Area in Edo State. He attended Immaculate Conception College, Benin City (1964-1969) and Edo College, Benin City (1970–1971). He then studied law at the University of Ife (now Obafemi Awolowo University), Ile-Ife from 1971 to 1975, earning an LL.B. degree. After graduation, he completed the Nigerian Law School and was called to the bar in 1976.

== Career ==
Idahosa entered the judiciary in the early 1990s. In June 1993 he was appointed a Judge of the Edo State High Court. He served on the High Court bench for over a decade. After the sudden death of Edo's then Chief Judge Michael I. Edokpayi in November 2009, Governor Adams Oshiomhole swore in Justice Idahosa as Acting Chief Judge. Idahosa was formally confirmed as the substantive Chief Judge of Edo State in 2010 and held that office until his retirement. In this role he presided over the state's judicial branch and was responsible for the administration of all Edo State courts. During his tenure, he also spearheaded initiatives such as the introduction of a Multi-Door Court House in Benin City to expand alternative dispute resolution services.

In January 2016 (marking his 64th birthday) and again in subsequent years, Idahosa delivered speeches and court sessions on retirement and legal reform. He urged lawyers to embrace mediation and other forms of Alternative Dispute Resolution, noting that lawyers "not skilled in ADR options will soon find themselves completely out of touch". At a ceremony inaugurating the Edo State Multi-Door Courthouse, he assured state government support for training judicial officers in mediation and improving access to justice. Governor Godwin Obaseki, who later succeeded Oshiomhole, praised Idahosa's efforts in strengthening the judiciary, stating that "the CJ is leaving his footprints indelibly in the sands of time".

=== Achievements ===
As Chief Judge, Idahosa oversaw several reforms to expedite litigation and improve judicial services. In September 2012, under his leadership the Edo State Judiciary replaced its 24-year-old Civil Procedure Rules with a new set of rules designed to reduce delays. He stated that the old rules (in use since 1988) had allowed cases to drag on for many years, and the new rules would restore public faith and "rekindle hope for the speedy dispensation of justice". Idahosa emphasized that an effective judicial system must be "independent, transparent, accountable, efficient, cost-effective and timely".

He also championed the use of Alternative Dispute Resolution. For example, on opening the state's Multi-Door Courthouse he called on the legal profession to "brace up" to mediation as a faster way of resolving disputes, warning that lawyers who ignored ADR would be out of touch with public needs.

His leadership was credited with tangible improvements in the state's public finances as well. The Edo State Internal Revenue Service (IRS) noted that Idahosa's tenure saw over 4,000 tax cases handled in court, reflecting a more effective tax regime. Idahosa personally inaugurated measures to support collection of a new Land Use Charge, saying that the state's land and revenue laws must be backed by court support. Under his guidance, the IRS executive chairman reported, Idahosa "brought in panache and style to the dispensation of justice which led to the development in the state". These reforms helped raise state revenues and reduce litigation backlogs.

During and after his tenure, Idahosa received many accolades from peers and public officials. Colleagues described him as an "erudite scholar of the law" who brought the courts closer to ordinary people. Upon his retirement in January 2017, the Edo IRS chief gave him a formal commendation for his "sterling leadership" and vital contributions to state development. At the same ceremony Governor Obaseki repeated that Idahosa had "left his footprints indelibly in the sands of time".

== Retirement ==
Idahosa retired upon reaching the statutory retirement age for state chief judges. He officially left office on 26 January 2017 and was succeeded by Justice Esohe Ikponwen. His retirement was marked by a valedictory court session and thanksgiving service in Benin City. In his valedictory speech he reflected on decades of service and thanked colleagues, saying "I did it for my state" in reference to his judicial contributions.

In retirement Justice Idahosa has remained active in legal discourse. He has made public statements urging that communal conflicts be resolved through the courts. For example, in January 2018 he warned that only legal processes, not violence, can bring lasting solutions to farmers-herders clashes, saying "legal way is the only way I know of settling disputes" and calling for patience while security agencies prosecute offenders. His continuing advocacy of due process and rule of law underscores his legacy as a jurist committed to justice. He is widely remembered for modernizing Edo's judiciary, improving case management, and enhancing cooperation between the courts and other branches of government.
