= Erbessa stroudi =

Scientific classification
- Kingdom: Animalia
- Phylum: Arthropoda
- Clade: Pancrustacea
- Class: Insecta
- Order: Lepidoptera
- Superfamily: Noctuoidea
- Family: Notodontidae
- Genus: Erbessa
- Species: E. stroudi

Binomial name
- Erbessa stroudi Miller, 2008

Species of moth

Erbessa stroudi is a moth of the family Notodontidae first described by James S. Miller in 2008. It is endemic to Costa Rica, where it is widespread in lowland and submontane forests on the slopes of the Cordillera Central in northern Costa Rica. It is known from nearly sea level up to an elevation of 1,100 m (3,600 ft). The length of the forewings is 16–18.5 mm for males and 16.5–18.5 mm for females. Caterpillars feed on Eugenia valerii.

== Taxonomy ==
Erbessa stroudi was formally described by the American entomologist James S. Miller in 2008 based on a male collected from Guanacaste in Costa Rica. The species is named after Steven M. Stroud and the Stroud family, whose support for conservation has helped the Area de Conservación Guanacaste, where the present species was discovered. E. stroudi is thought to be most closely related to E. regis.

== Description ==
The length of the forewings is 16–18.5 mm for males and 16.5–18.5 mm for females.

It is extremely similar to E. regis, but can be told apart from that species by the uniform yellow on both the forewings and hindwings, a longer yellow central streak on the hindwing, and the differing shape of the yellow triangle near the base of the forewing. Additionally, these two species are widely separated in their ranges, with E. regis being native to Ecuador, Peru, and Bolivia, compared to the Costa Rican endemic E. stroudi.

== Distribution and habitat ==
Erbessa stroudi is endemic to Costa Rica, where it is widespread in lowland and submontane forests. It inhabits the Cordillera Central mountain range from the Caribbean shore of Costa Rica almost to the Pacific coast. It is known from nearly sea level up to an elevation of 1,100 m (3,600 ft).

Caterpillars feed on Eugenia valerii in the family Myrtaceae, which is unique within its genus; most Erbessa species seem to feed on Melastomataceae.
