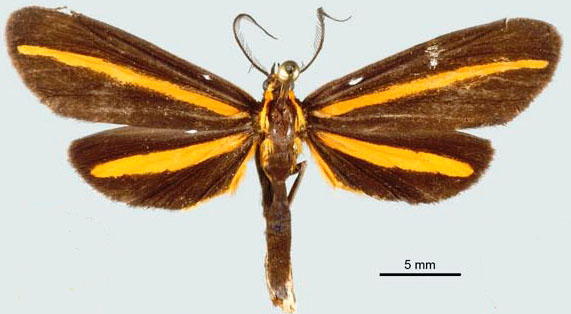

Scientific classification
- Kingdom: Animalia
- Phylum: Arthropoda
- Clade: Pancrustacea
- Class: Insecta
- Order: Lepidoptera
- Superfamily: Noctuoidea
- Family: Notodontidae
- Genus: Josia
- Species: J. fustula

Binomial name
- Josia fustula Warren, 1901

= Josia fustula =

Species of moth

Josia fustula is a moth of the family Notodontidae. It is found on the Pacific slope of the Andes in Ecuador and perhaps also Colombia and Peru.

Larvae have been reared on Passiflora rubra.
