= Erbessa tegyroides =

Scientific classification
- Kingdom: Animalia
- Phylum: Arthropoda
- Clade: Pancrustacea
- Class: Insecta
- Order: Lepidoptera
- Superfamily: Noctuoidea
- Family: Notodontidae
- Genus: Erbessa
- Species: E. tegyroides

Binomial name
- Erbessa tegyroides Miller, 2008

Species of moth

Erbessa tegyroides is a moth of the family Notodontidae first described by James S. Miller in 2008. The length of the forewings is 12 mm for males and 13.5–14 mm for females. It is native to Peru and Ecuador and is known from an elevation of 700 m (2,300 ft). It is a mimic of the josiine moth Proutiella tegyra and differs significantly from all other moths in its genus in its appearance. Caterpillars E. tegyroides of feed on Miconia plants.

== Taxonomy ==
Erbessa tegyroides was formally described by the American entomologist James S. Miller in 2008 based on a male collected from Madre de Dios Department in Peru. Its specific epithet is derived from the name of the moth species Proutiella tegyra, which female E. tegyroides are extremely similar to. E. tegyroides is thought to be most closely related to as as-yet undescribed species of Erbessa native to Sucumbíos Province in Ecuador.

== Description ==
It is a rather small species, with the length of the forewings being 12 mm in males and 13.5–14 mm in females. The species is extremely different from all other moths in its genus in its appearance, instead resembling Proutiella tegyra, which it mimics. The forewing is black with a diagonal orange-yellow stripe. The hindwing is blackish-brown, ovular orange spot in the middle. The underside of the hindwing is silvery-white with a thick, blackish-brown border along the edges. E. tegyroides can be distinguished from P. tegyra by a cream-yellow streak near the base of the forewing.

== Distribution and habitat ==
Erbessa tegyroides is native to Peru and Ecuador. It is known from an elevation of 700 m (2,300 ft). It is a mimic of the josiine moth Proutiella tegyra. Several other moths from the families Arctiidae and Pyralidae are known to be part of this mimicry complex in Tambopata National Reserve in Peru. Caterpillars E. tegyroides of feed on Miconia plants.
