= Erbessa pyraloides =

Scientific classification
- Kingdom: Animalia
- Phylum: Arthropoda
- Class: Insecta
- Order: Lepidoptera
- Superfamily: Noctuoidea
- Family: Notodontidae
- Genus: Erbessa
- Species: E. pyraloides

Binomial name
- Erbessa pyraloides (Walker, 1854)

Synonyms
- Chrysauge pyraloides Walker, 1854

Species of moth

Erbessa pyraloides is a moth of the family Notodontidae first described by Francis Walker in 1854. It is found in Brazil, Colombia and Venezuela.

The length of the forewings is 17–19 mm for males.

The larvae have been recorded feeding on Eucalyptus cloeziana, which is an introduced species.
