= Erbessa prolifera =

Scientific classification
- Kingdom: Animalia
- Phylum: Arthropoda
- Class: Insecta
- Order: Lepidoptera
- Superfamily: Noctuoidea
- Family: Notodontidae
- Genus: Erbessa
- Species: E. prolifera

Binomial name
- Erbessa prolifera (Walker, 1854)

Synonyms
- Josia prolifera Walker, 1854; Glissa bifacies Walker, 1864; Oricia grandis Bryk, 1953; Adelphoneura nerias C. Felder & R. Felder, 1874

Species of moth

Erbessa prolifera is a moth of the family Notodontidae first described by Francis Walker in 1854. It is found in Brazil, Guyana and Peru.
