= Erbessa euryzona =

Scientific classification
- Kingdom: Animalia
- Phylum: Arthropoda
- Clade: Pancrustacea
- Class: Insecta
- Order: Lepidoptera
- Superfamily: Noctuoidea
- Family: Notodontidae
- Genus: Erbessa
- Species: E. euryzona

Binomial name
- Erbessa euryzona (L. B. Prout, 1922)

Synonyms
- Myonia euryzona Prout, 1922

Species of moth

Erbessa euryzona is a moth of the family Notodontidae first described by Louis Beethoven Prout in 1922. It is found in Bolivia.
