= Erbessa clite =

Scientific classification
- Kingdom: Animalia
- Phylum: Arthropoda
- Class: Insecta
- Order: Lepidoptera
- Superfamily: Noctuoidea
- Family: Notodontidae
- Genus: Erbessa
- Species: E. clite

Binomial name
- Erbessa clite (Walker, 1854)

Synonyms
- Josia clite Walker, 1854; Ephialtias aequivoca Warren, 1901

Species of moth

Erbessa clite is a moth of the family Notodontidae first described by Francis Walker in 1854. It is found in Brazil, Venezuela, French Guiana and Guyana.
