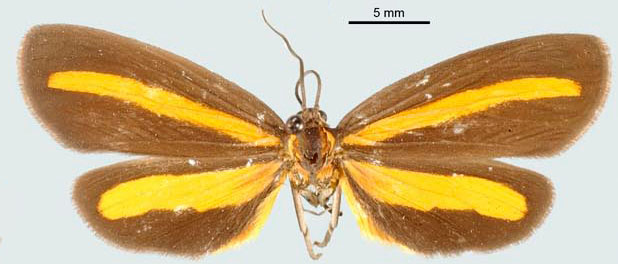

Scientific classification
- Kingdom: Animalia
- Phylum: Arthropoda
- Clade: Pancrustacea
- Class: Insecta
- Order: Lepidoptera
- Superfamily: Noctuoidea
- Family: Notodontidae
- Genus: Josia
- Species: J. infausta

Binomial name
- Josia infausta Hering, 1925

= Josia infausta =

Species of moth

Josia infausta is a moth of the family Notodontidae. It is found in Panama and the Chocó region of northwestern Colombia.
