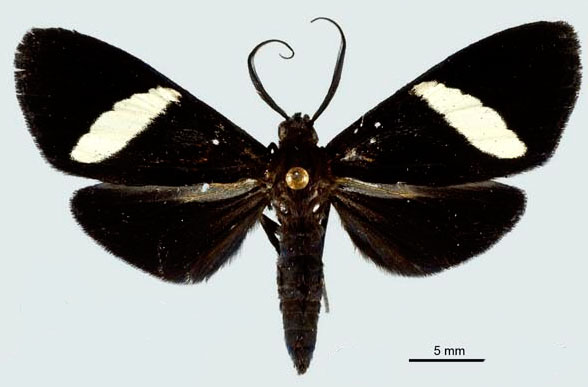

Scientific classification
- Kingdom: Animalia
- Phylum: Arthropoda
- Clade: Pancrustacea
- Class: Insecta
- Order: Lepidoptera
- Superfamily: Noctuoidea
- Family: Notodontidae
- Genus: Getta
- Species: G. niveifascia

Binomial name
- Getta niveifascia Walker, 1864

Synonyms
- Getta probles Prout, 1918

= Getta niveifascia =

Species of moth

Getta niveifascia is a moth of the family Notodontidae. It is found in the Amazonian region of South America, including French Guiana.

Larvae have been reared on Passiflora candida.
