= Erbessa thiaucourti =

Scientific classification
- Kingdom: Animalia
- Phylum: Arthropoda
- Clade: Pancrustacea
- Class: Insecta
- Order: Lepidoptera
- Superfamily: Noctuoidea
- Family: Notodontidae
- Genus: Erbessa
- Species: E. thiaucourti

Binomial name
- Erbessa thiaucourti Miller, 2008

Species of moth

Erbessa thiaucourti is a moth of the family Notodontidae first described by James S. Miller in 2008. The length of the forewings is 14.5–16 mm for males and 19 mm for females. The forewing is blackish-brown with a metallic violet hue; it is marked with iridescent gray-brown costa, three glossy blue streaks at its base, and a glossy white oval-shaped fascia. The hindwing is blackish-brown with a metallic blue and violet hue. It is endemic to French Guiana.

== Taxonomy ==
Erbessa thiaucourti was formally described by the American entomologist James S. Miller in 2008 based on a male collected from Counamama road in French Guiana. This species is named in honor of Paul Thiaucourt, a French lepidopterist who has published extensively on the Notodontidae.

== Description ==
The length of the forewings is 14.5–16 mm for males and 19 mm for females. The forewing is blackish-brown with a metallic violet hue and iridescent gray-brown costa. There are three glossy blue streaks at the base of the forewing, varying in color from turquoise to cobalt blue. These is a glossy white fascia, in the shape of a crosswise oval, located at a bit over half the wing length from the base. The underside of the forewing has a similar pattern, but lacks the basal streaks, instead having a uniform turquoise wash from the base to the fascia. The hindwing is blackish-brown, with a metallic blue hue for the three-quarters of the area closest to the base and a metallic violet hue for the remaining area. The violet-hued area is broadest near the tip of the hindwing.

== Distribution and habitat ==
Erbessa thiaucourti is endemic to French Guiana, where it has been recorded from the Counamama road and the Kaw Marshes. It is a rather scarce species.
