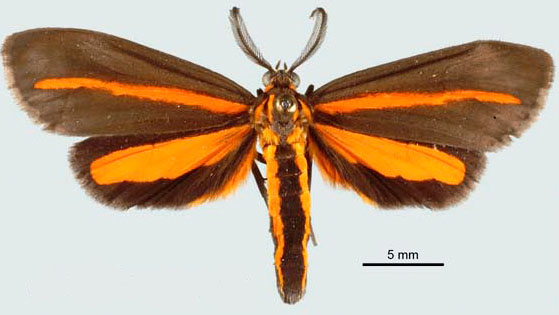

Scientific classification
- Kingdom: Animalia
- Phylum: Arthropoda
- Clade: Pancrustacea
- Class: Insecta
- Order: Lepidoptera
- Superfamily: Noctuoidea
- Family: Notodontidae
- Genus: Josia
- Species: J. insincera

Binomial name
- Josia insincera Prout, 1918

= Josia insincera =

Species of moth

Josia insincera is a moth of the family Notodontidae first described by Louis Beethoven Prout in 1918. It lives in Venezuela, where larvae are reared on Passiflora biflora.
