= Erbessa cassandra =

Scientific classification
- Kingdom: Animalia
- Phylum: Arthropoda
- Class: Insecta
- Order: Lepidoptera
- Superfamily: Noctuoidea
- Family: Notodontidae
- Genus: Erbessa
- Species: E. cassandra

Binomial name
- Erbessa cassandra (H. Druce, 1885)

Synonyms
- Pseuderbessa cassandra H. Druce, 1885

Species of moth

Erbessa cassandra is a moth of the family Notodontidae that was first described by Herbert Druce in 1885. It is found in Colombia, Ecuador and Peru.
