= Erbessa umbrifera =

Scientific classification
- Kingdom: Animalia
- Phylum: Arthropoda
- Class: Insecta
- Order: Lepidoptera
- Superfamily: Noctuoidea
- Family: Notodontidae
- Genus: Erbessa
- Species: E. umbrifera

Binomial name
- Erbessa umbrifera (Walker, 1854)

Synonyms
- Dioptis umbrifera Walker, 1854; Phelloe decorata Walker, 1864; Phelloe munda Walker, 1864

Species of moth

Erbessa umbrifera is a moth of the family Notodontidae first described by Francis Walker in 1854. It is found in French Guiana, Guyana, Suriname and Brazil.
