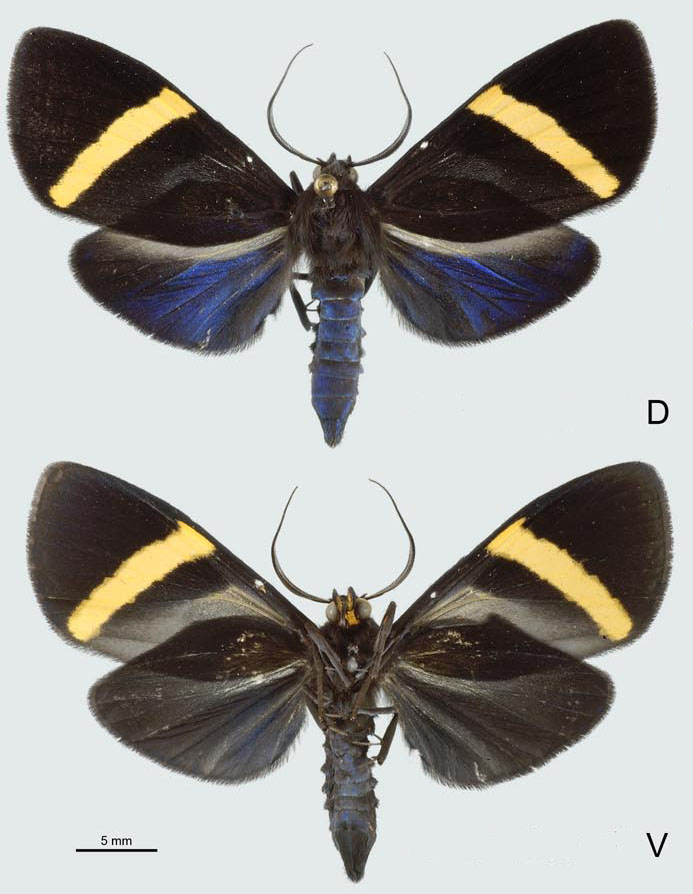
- Getta baetifica

Scientific classification
- Kingdom: Animalia
- Phylum: Arthropoda
- Clade: Pancrustacea
- Class: Insecta
- Order: Lepidoptera
- Superfamily: Noctuoidea
- Family: Notodontidae
- Tribe: Josiini
- Genus: Getta; Walker, 1864

= Getta =

Genus of moths

Getta is a genus of moths of the family Notodontidae.

== Species ==
- Getta baetifica (Druce, 1898)
- Getta ennia Druce, 1899
- Getta niveifascia Walker, 1864
- Getta tica J.S. Miller, 2009
- Getta turrenti J.S. Miller, 2009
- Getta unicolor (Hering, 1925)
