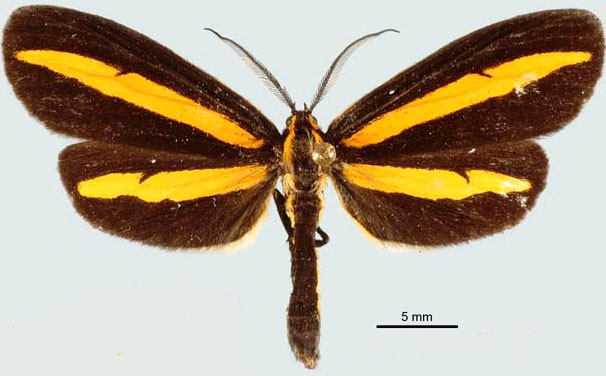

Scientific classification
- Kingdom: Animalia
- Phylum: Arthropoda
- Clade: Pancrustacea
- Class: Insecta
- Order: Lepidoptera
- Superfamily: Noctuoidea
- Family: Notodontidae
- Genus: Josia
- Species: J. ligata

Binomial name
- Josia ligata Walker, 1864

= Josia ligata =

Species of moth

Josia ligata is a moth of the family Notodontidae. It is found in Colombia and Ecuador.

Larvae have been recorded on Passiflora mollissima.
