= Erbessa biplagiata =

Scientific classification
- Kingdom: Animalia
- Phylum: Arthropoda
- Class: Insecta
- Order: Lepidoptera
- Superfamily: Noctuoidea
- Family: Notodontidae
- Genus: Erbessa
- Species: E. biplagiata

Binomial name
- Erbessa biplagiata (Warren, 1897)

Synonyms
- Oricia biplagiata Warren, 1897; Myonia peruviana Dognin, 1919

Species of moth

Erbessa biplagiata is a moth of the family Notodontidae first described by William Warren in 1897. It is found in Bolivia and Peru.
