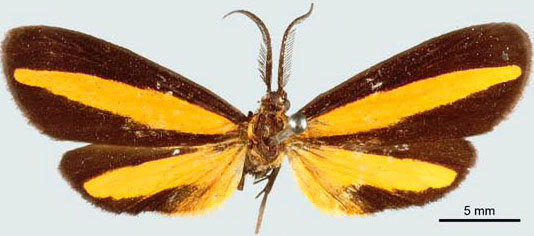

Scientific classification
- Kingdom: Animalia
- Phylum: Arthropoda
- Clade: Pancrustacea
- Class: Insecta
- Order: Lepidoptera
- Superfamily: Noctuoidea
- Family: Notodontidae
- Genus: Josia
- Species: J. subcuneifera

Binomial name
- Josia subcuneifera Dognin, 1902

= Josia subcuneifera =

Species of moth

Josia subcuneifera is a moth of the family Notodontidae. It is found in Ecuador and Peru.
