= Erbessa projecta =

Scientific classification
- Kingdom: Animalia
- Phylum: Arthropoda
- Class: Insecta
- Order: Lepidoptera
- Superfamily: Noctuoidea
- Family: Notodontidae
- Genus: Erbessa
- Species: E. projecta

Binomial name
- Erbessa projecta (Warren, 1909)

Synonyms
- Oricia projecta Warren, 1909

Species of moth

Erbessa projecta is a moth of the family Notodontidae first described by William Warren in 1909. It is found in Brazil.
