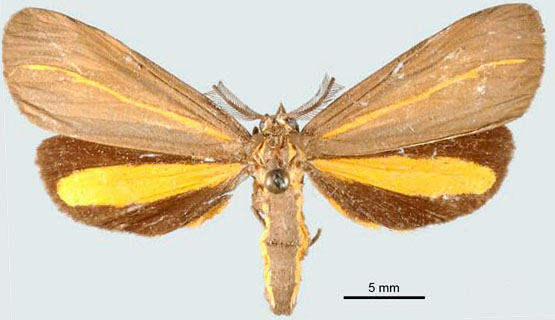

Scientific classification
- Kingdom: Animalia
- Phylum: Arthropoda
- Clade: Pancrustacea
- Class: Insecta
- Order: Lepidoptera
- Superfamily: Noctuoidea
- Family: Notodontidae
- Genus: Josia
- Species: J. similis

Binomial name
- Josia similis Hering, 1925

= Josia similis =

Species of moth

Josia similis is a moth of the family Notodontidae. It is only known from north-eastern Brazil.
