= Erbessa evippoides =

Scientific classification
- Kingdom: Animalia
- Phylum: Arthropoda
- Class: Insecta
- Order: Lepidoptera
- Superfamily: Noctuoidea
- Family: Notodontidae
- Genus: Erbessa
- Species: E. evippoides

Binomial name
- Erbessa evippoides (Hering, 1925)

Synonyms
- Myonia evippoides Hering, 1925; Myonia xanthogramma Hering, 1926

Species of moth

Erbessa evippoides is a moth of the family Notodontidae first described by Hering in 1925. It is found in Colombia and Ecuador.
