= Erbessa integra =

Scientific classification
- Kingdom: Animalia
- Phylum: Arthropoda
- Class: Insecta
- Order: Lepidoptera
- Superfamily: Noctuoidea
- Family: Notodontidae
- Genus: Erbessa
- Species: E. integra

Binomial name
- Erbessa integra (C. Felder & R. Felder, 1874)

Synonyms
- Clastognatha integra C. Felder & R. Felder, 1874

Species of moth

Erbessa integra is a moth of the family Notodontidae first described by Cajetan and Rudolf Felder in 1874. It is found in Brazil.
