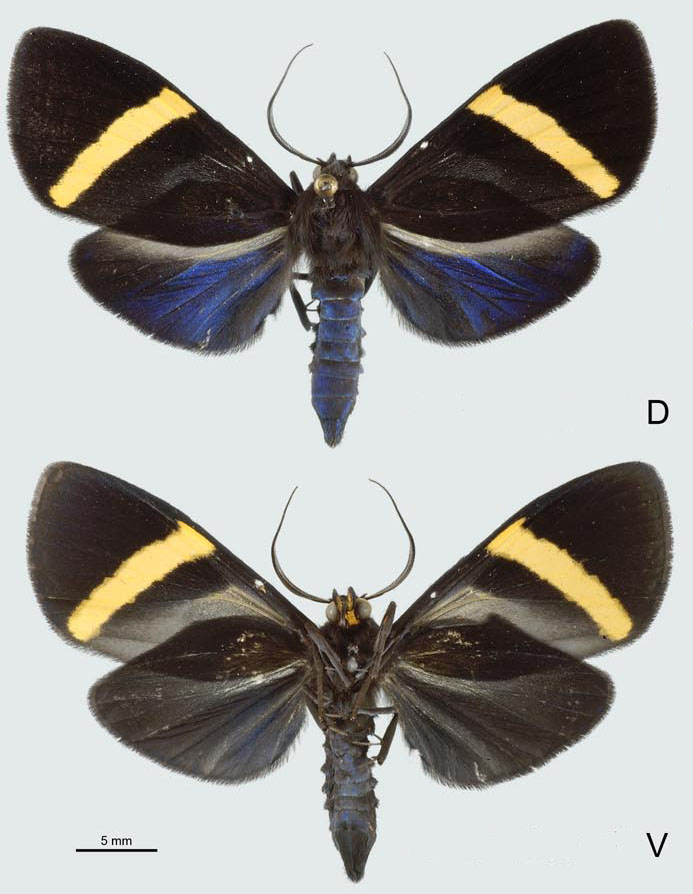

Scientific classification
- Kingdom: Animalia
- Phylum: Arthropoda
- Clade: Pancrustacea
- Class: Insecta
- Order: Lepidoptera
- Superfamily: Noctuoidea
- Family: Notodontidae
- Genus: Getta
- Species: G. baetifica

Binomial name
- Getta baetifica (H. Druce, 1898)

Synonyms
- Ephialtias baetifica H. Druce, 1898

= Getta baetifica =

Species of moth

Getta baetifica is a moth of the family Notodontidae first described by Herbert Druce in 1898. It is endemic to the western slopes of the Andes in Colombia and Ecuador.

Larvae have been reared on Passiflora macrophylla and Passiflora arborea.
