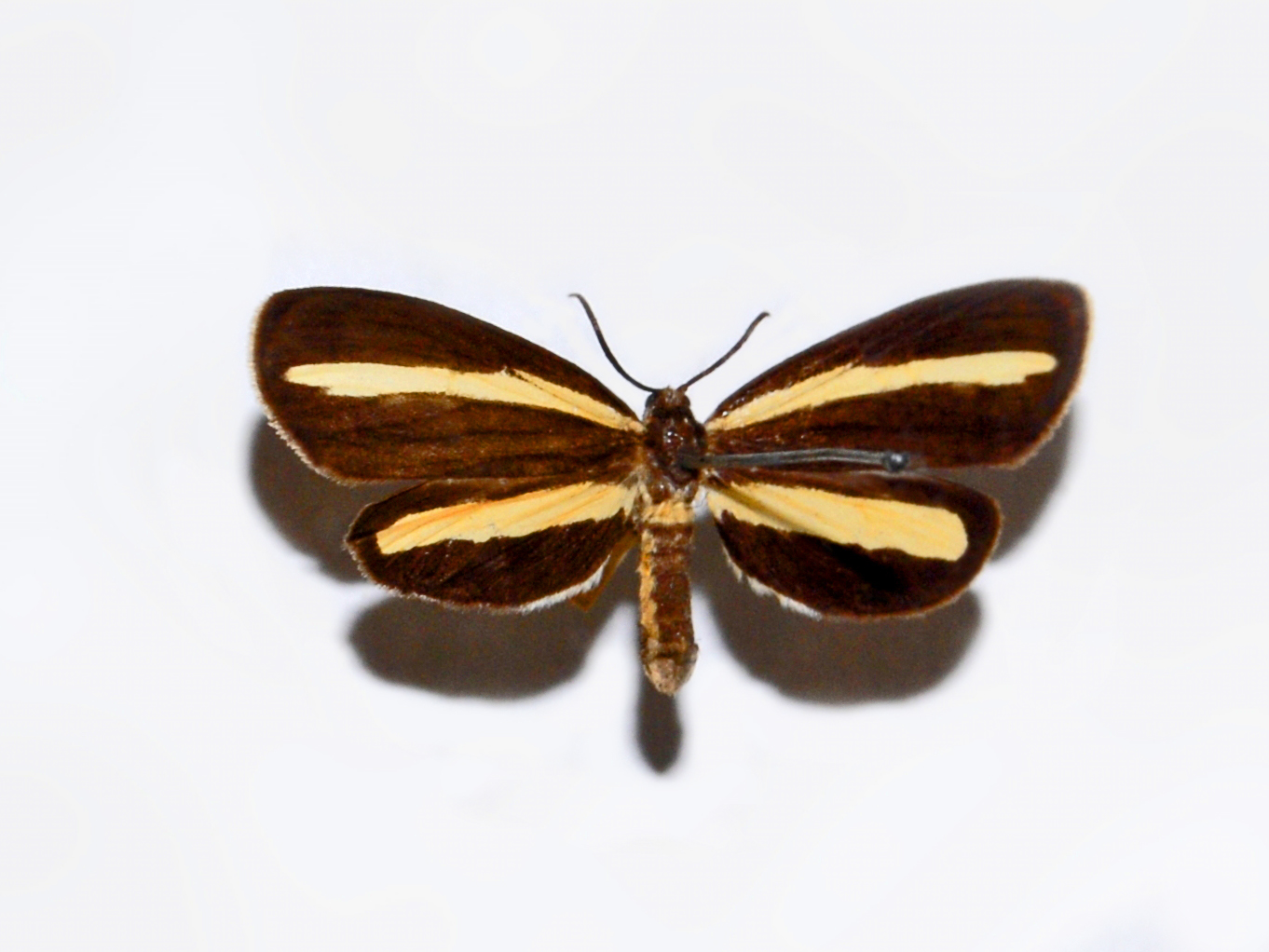
- Josia trabeata

Scientific classification
- Kingdom: Animalia
- Phylum: Arthropoda
- Clade: Pancrustacea
- Class: Insecta
- Order: Lepidoptera
- Superfamily: Noctuoidea
- Family: Notodontidae
- Tribe: Josiini
- Genus: Josia; Hübner, [1819]

Synonyms
- Phalcidon Walker, 1854; Phalcidona Walker, [1865]

= Josia =

Genus of moths

Josia is a genus of moths of the family Notodontidae erected by Jacob Hübner in 1819.

== Species ==
This genus consists of the following species:

- Josia auriflua Walker, 1864
- Josia aurifusa Walker, 1854
- Josia frigida Druce, 1885
- Josia fusigera Walker, 1864
- Josia fustula Warren, 1901
- Josia gigantea (Druce, 1885)
- Josia infausta Hering, 1925
- Josia insincera Prout, 1918
- Josia integra Walker, 1854
- Josia interrupta Warren, 1901
- Josia ligata Walker, 1864
- Josia ligula (Hübner, 1806)
- Josia megaera (Fabricius, 1787)
- Josia mononeura (Hübner, 1806)
- Josia neblina Miller, 2009
- Josia oribia Druce, 1885
- Josia radians Warren, 1905
- Josia similis Hering, 1925
- Josia subcuneifera Dognin, 1902
- Josia turgida Warren, 1905

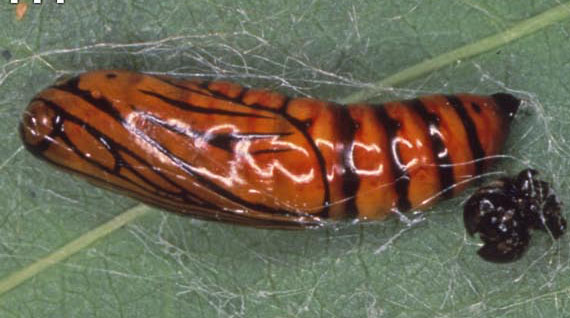
Pupa of a Josia species in Ecuador

Josia lativitta Walker, 1869 is only known from an illustration and discussions in the historical literature. Miller (2009) was unable to locate the holotype. He suggests that it may be a synonym of Josia ligula.
