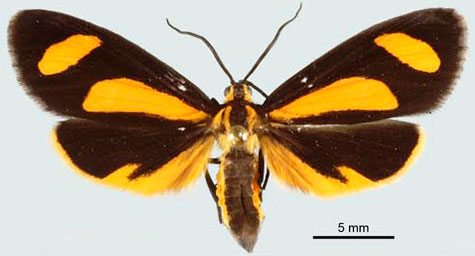

Scientific classification
- Kingdom: Animalia
- Phylum: Arthropoda
- Clade: Pancrustacea
- Class: Insecta
- Order: Lepidoptera
- Superfamily: Noctuoidea
- Family: Notodontidae
- Genus: Josia
- Species: J. megaera

Binomial name
- Josia megaera (Fabricius, 1787)

Synonyms
- Bombyx megaera Fabricius, 1787; Josiodes fasciata Rothschild, 1912; Josia fruhstorferi Proutm 1918; Josia putata Hering, 1925

= Josia megaera =

Species of moth

Josia megaera is a moth of the family Notodontidae. It is found from Brazil to Venezuela.

Larvae have been reared on Turnera odorata.
