= Erbessa inaria =

Scientific classification
- Kingdom: Animalia
- Phylum: Arthropoda
- Class: Insecta
- Order: Lepidoptera
- Superfamily: Noctuoidea
- Family: Notodontidae
- Genus: Erbessa
- Species: E. inaria

Binomial name
- Erbessa inaria (H. Druce, 1885)

Synonyms
- Phaeochlaena inaria H. Druce, 1885

Species of moth

Erbessa inaria is a moth of the family Notodontidae first described by Herbert Druce in 1885. It is found in Ecuador and Peru.
