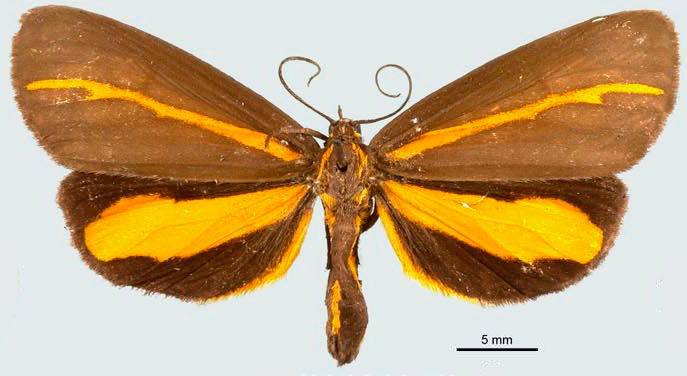

Scientific classification
- Kingdom: Animalia
- Phylum: Arthropoda
- Clade: Pancrustacea
- Class: Insecta
- Order: Lepidoptera
- Superfamily: Noctuoidea
- Family: Notodontidae
- Genus: Josia
- Species: J. mononeura

Binomial name
- Josia mononeura (Hübner, 1806)

Synonyms
- Josia mitis Walker, 1856; Hypocrita Tineiformis mononeura Hübner, 1806

= Josia mononeura =

Species of moth

Josia mononeura is a moth of the family Notodontidae. It is found in southeastern Brazil, Uruguay and northern Argentina.

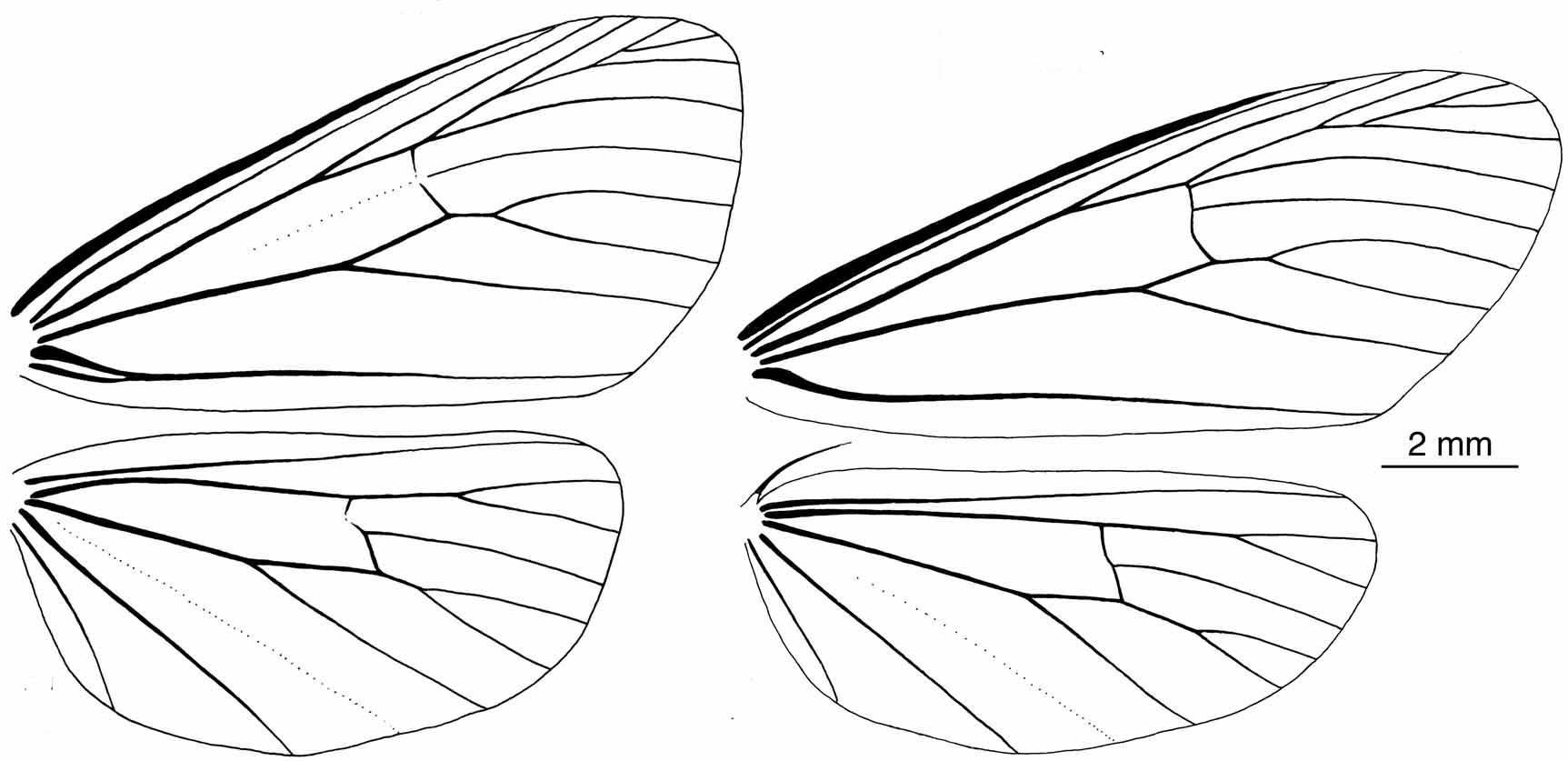
Wing venation of Josia mononeura (left) and Josia ligula (right)
