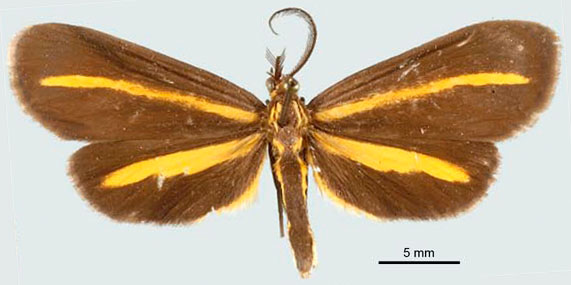

Scientific classification
- Kingdom: Animalia
- Phylum: Arthropoda
- Clade: Pancrustacea
- Class: Insecta
- Order: Lepidoptera
- Superfamily: Noctuoidea
- Family: Notodontidae
- Genus: Josia
- Species: J. interrupta

Binomial name
- Josia interrupta Warren, 1901

= Josia interrupta =

Species of moth

Josia interrupta is a moth of the family Notodontidae. It is found in from the Cordillera Central of Colombia. There is one record from Panama.
