= Erbessa primula =

Scientific classification
- Kingdom: Animalia
- Phylum: Arthropoda
- Class: Insecta
- Order: Lepidoptera
- Superfamily: Noctuoidea
- Family: Notodontidae
- Genus: Erbessa
- Species: E. primula

Binomial name
- Erbessa primula (Dognin, 1919)

Synonyms
- Myonia primula Dognin, 1919; Myonia ederi Prout, 1918

Species of moth

Erbessa primula is a moth of the family Notodontidae first described by Paul Dognin in 1919. It is found in Colombia, Ecuador and Peru.
