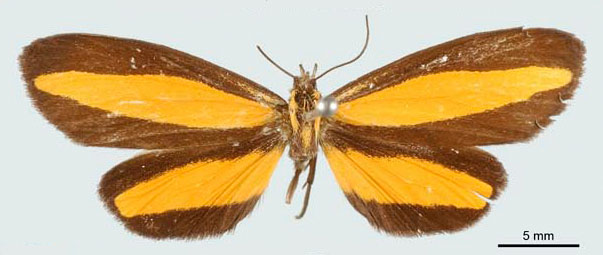

Scientific classification
- Kingdom: Animalia
- Phylum: Arthropoda
- Class: Insecta
- Order: Lepidoptera
- Superfamily: Noctuoidea
- Family: Notodontidae
- Genus: Erbessa
- Species: E. mimica

Binomial name
- Erbessa mimica (Hering, 1925)

Synonyms
- Myonia mimica Hering 1925

= Erbessa mimica =

Species of moth

Erbessa mimica is a moth of the family Notodontidae first described by Hering in 1925. It is found in Bolivia. The life expectancy of the moth is around 60 to 90 days.

It is engaged in Müllerian mimicry with Josia oribia.
