= Erbessa dominula =

Scientific classification
- Kingdom: Animalia
- Phylum: Arthropoda
- Class: Insecta
- Order: Lepidoptera
- Superfamily: Noctuoidea
- Family: Notodontidae
- Genus: Erbessa
- Species: E. dominula

Binomial name
- Erbessa dominula (Warren, 1909)

Synonyms
- Oricia dominula Warren, 1909

Species of moth

Erbessa dominula is a moth of the family Notodontidae first described by William Warren in 1909. It is found in Argentina, Uruguay and Brazil.
