= Erbessa cuneiplaga =

Scientific classification
- Kingdom: Animalia
- Phylum: Arthropoda
- Clade: Pancrustacea
- Class: Insecta
- Order: Lepidoptera
- Superfamily: Noctuoidea
- Family: Notodontidae
- Genus: Erbessa
- Species: E. cuneiplaga

Binomial name
- Erbessa cuneiplaga (L. B. Prout, 1918)

Synonyms
- Myonia cuneiplaga Prout, 1918

Species of moth

Erbessa cuneiplaga is a moth of the family Notodontidae first described by Louis Beethoven Prout in 1918. It is found in Suriname, French Guiana and Brazil.
