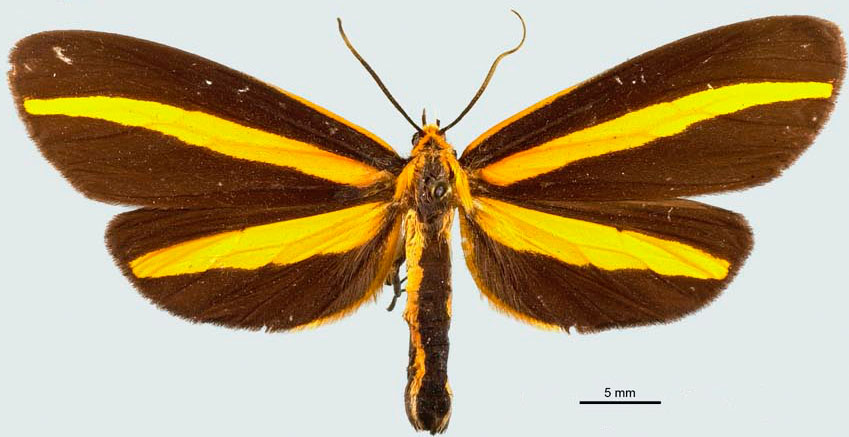

Scientific classification
- Kingdom: Animalia
- Phylum: Arthropoda
- Clade: Pancrustacea
- Class: Insecta
- Order: Lepidoptera
- Superfamily: Noctuoidea
- Family: Notodontidae
- Genus: Josia
- Species: J. gigantea

Binomial name
- Josia gigantea (H. Druce, 1885)

Synonyms
- Josiomorpha gigantea H. Druce, 1885

= Josia gigantea =

Species of moth

Josia gigantea is a moth of the family Notodontidae first described by Herbert Druce in 1885. It is found from southern Mexico to Colombia.

Larvae have been recorded on Passiflora sexflora and Passiflora apatela in Costa Rica.
