= Erbessa continens =

Scientific classification
- Kingdom: Animalia
- Phylum: Arthropoda
- Clade: Pancrustacea
- Class: Insecta
- Order: Lepidoptera
- Superfamily: Noctuoidea
- Family: Notodontidae
- Genus: Erbessa
- Species: E. continens

Binomial name
- Erbessa continens (L. B. Prout, 1918)

Synonyms
- Myonia continens Prout, 1918; Myonia amplificata Hering, 1925; Myonia caeneides Prout, 1918; Myonia flavifascia Hering, 1925

Species of moth

Erbessa continens is a moth of the family Notodontidae first described by Louis Beethoven Prout in 1918. It is found in Ecuador, Peru, Bolivia and Brazil.
