= Erbessa celata =

Scientific classification
- Kingdom: Animalia
- Phylum: Arthropoda
- Class: Insecta
- Order: Lepidoptera
- Superfamily: Noctuoidea
- Family: Notodontidae
- Genus: Erbessa
- Species: E. celata

Binomial name
- Erbessa celata (Warren, 1906)

Synonyms
- Dialephtis celata Warren, 1906

Species of moth

Erbessa celata is a moth of the family Notodontidae first described by William Warren in 1906. It is found in Peru.
