= Erbessa basivitta =

Scientific classification
- Kingdom: Animalia
- Phylum: Arthropoda
- Clade: Pancrustacea
- Class: Insecta
- Order: Lepidoptera
- Superfamily: Noctuoidea
- Family: Notodontidae
- Genus: Erbessa
- Species: E. basivitta

Binomial name
- Erbessa basivitta (L. B. Prout, 1918)

Synonyms
- Myonia basivitta Prout, 1918

Species of moth

Erbessa basivitta is a moth of the family Notodontidae first described by Louis Beethoven Prout in 1918. It is found in Brazil.
