= Erbessa quadricolor =

Scientific classification
- Kingdom: Animalia
- Phylum: Arthropoda
- Class: Insecta
- Order: Lepidoptera
- Superfamily: Noctuoidea
- Family: Notodontidae
- Genus: Erbessa
- Species: E. quadricolor

Binomial name
- Erbessa quadricolor (Walker, 1856)

Synonyms
- Phaeochlaena quadricolor Walker, 1856

Species of moth

Erbessa quadricolor is a moth of the family Notodontidae first described by Francis Walker in 1856. It is found in Brazil.
