= Erbessa conigera =

Scientific classification
- Kingdom: Animalia
- Phylum: Arthropoda
- Clade: Pancrustacea
- Class: Insecta
- Order: Lepidoptera
- Superfamily: Noctuoidea
- Family: Notodontidae
- Genus: Erbessa
- Species: E. conigera

Binomial name
- Erbessa conigera (L. B. Prout, 1918)

Synonyms
- Myonia conigera Prout, 1918

Species of moth

Erbessa conigera is a moth of the family Notodontidae first described by Louis Beethoven Prout in 1918. It is found in Peru and Ecuador.
