= Esohe Frances Ikponmwen =

Nigerian Jurist and former Chief Judge of Edo State

Chief Judge of Edo State, Nigeria
- In office 26 January 2017 – 22 November 2019
- Appointed by: Godwin Obaseki
- Preceded by: Justice C. O. Idahosa
- Succeeded by: Justice Esther Edigin

Personal details
- Born: 22 November 1954 (age 71) Warri

Esohe Frances Ikponmwen (born 22 November 1954) is a Nigerian jurist who served as Chief Judge of Edo State from 26 January 2017 to 22 November 2019. She was succeeded by Justice Esther Edigin.

== Early life and education ==
Ikponmwen was born on 22 November 1954 in Warri, Nigeria. She attended Anglican Girls' Grammar School in Ughelli and later Government College, Ughelli. Ikponmwen matriculated at the University of Nigeria, Enugu Campus, in 1974 and earned a law degree in 1978. She proceeded to the Nigerian Law School and obtained her Barrister-at-Law (B.L.) certificate in 1979. She was called to the Nigerian Bar on 17 July 1979.

== Career ==
In 1980, shortly after NYSC, Ikponmwen joined the Bendel State Ministry of Justice as a State Counsel (Grade II) and rose through the ranks becoming Principal State Counsel by 1991. After the creation of Edo State in 1991, she was appointed Chief Magistrate Grade I, serving in Benin City and in Abudu.

She also served as vice chairman (1992–1997) and then chairman of the Edo State Magistrates' Association. In 1999, she was elevated to the Edo State High Court bench, serving in Benin City, Ekpoma and Auchi Judicial Divisions.

In 2002 she was designated as the Edo State judge for the Independent Corrupt Practices Commission (ICPC) and later for the Economic and Financial Crimes Commission (EFCC). She also chaired several electoral and judicial management tribunals in Nigeria.

In January 2017, Governor Godwin Obaseki nominated Ikponmwen as Chief Judge of Edo State, and the Edo State House of Assembly confirmed her appointment (effective 26 January 2017).

She succeeded Justice C. O. Idahosa and was sworn in as Chief Judge in early 2017, serving until her statutory retirement on 22 November 2019.

== Honours ==
Ikponmwen has received several honours for her service to law and justice. In 2019 the Benin branch of the Nigerian Bar Association (NBA) conferred on her a Life Time Achievers' Award for her contributions to the development of law and the rule of law.

That year, upon her retirement, the Oba of Benin, Oba Ewuare II, honoured her by presenting the traditional royal Ikele beaded ring and appointing her to the Benin Kingdom's Alternate Dispute Resolution Committee.

She is a Paul Harris Fellow of Rotary International.

== Personal life ==
Ikponmwen is a member of the Church of Jesus Christ of Latter-day Saints. She is married to Edward Osawaru Ikponmwen, and has five children.

== Sources ==
- article from The Nation of Nigeria on Ikponmwen's taking office
- Mormon News Room article on Ikponmwen
- Edo State Judiciary profile of Ikponmwen
