= Erbessa pales =

Scientific classification
- Kingdom: Animalia
- Phylum: Arthropoda
- Class: Insecta
- Order: Lepidoptera
- Superfamily: Noctuoidea
- Family: Notodontidae
- Genus: Erbessa
- Species: E. pales

Binomial name
- Erbessa pales (H. Druce, 1893)

Synonyms
- Metastatia pales H. Druce, 1893

Species of moth

Erbessa pales is a moth of the family Notodontidae first described by Herbert Druce in 1893. It is found in Ecuador, Brazil, Peru and Bolivia.

The larvae feed on Miconia species.
