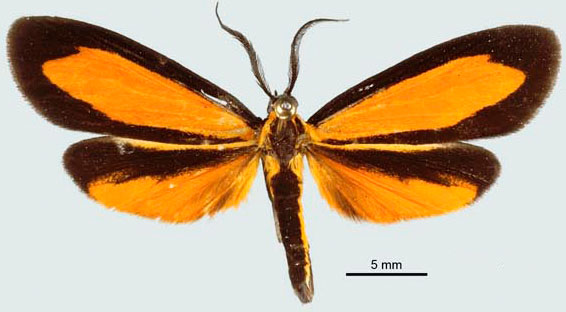

Scientific classification
- Kingdom: Animalia
- Phylum: Arthropoda
- Clade: Pancrustacea
- Class: Insecta
- Order: Lepidoptera
- Superfamily: Noctuoidea
- Family: Notodontidae
- Genus: Josia
- Species: J. auriflua

Binomial name
- Josia auriflua Walker, 1864

Synonyms
- ?Josia inaequiflexa Dognin, 1918; ?Josia scalata Dognin, 1911; ?Josia flavipars Prout, 1918

= Josia auriflua =

Species of moth

Josia auriflua is a moth of the family Notodontidae. It is found in South America, from Bolivia to French Guiana (including the western Andes in Colombia and Ecuador).
