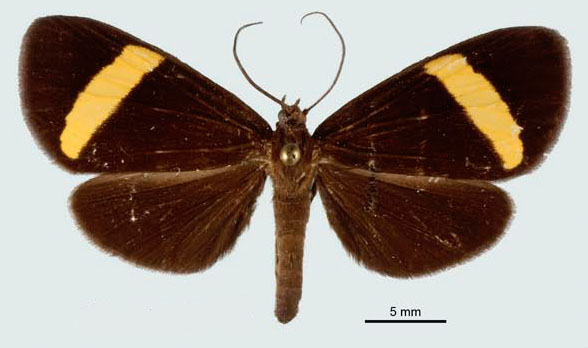

Scientific classification
- Kingdom: Animalia
- Phylum: Arthropoda
- Clade: Pancrustacea
- Class: Insecta
- Order: Lepidoptera
- Superfamily: Noctuoidea
- Family: Notodontidae
- Genus: Getta
- Species: G. ennia

Binomial name
- Getta ennia H. Druce, 1899

= Getta ennia =

Species of moth

Getta ennia is a moth of the family Notodontidae first described by Herbert Druce in 1899. It is found in the Amazon basin, including Peru.
