= Erbessa avara =

Scientific classification
- Kingdom: Animalia
- Phylum: Arthropoda
- Class: Insecta
- Order: Lepidoptera
- Superfamily: Noctuoidea
- Family: Notodontidae
- Genus: Erbessa
- Species: E. avara

Binomial name
- Erbessa avara (H. Druce, 1899)

Synonyms
- Scotura avara H. Druce, 1899

Species of moth

Erbessa avara is a moth of the family Notodontidae first described by Herbert Druce in 1899. It is found in Ecuador.

The larvae feed on Miconia species.
