= Erbessa semimarginata =

Scientific classification
- Kingdom: Animalia
- Phylum: Arthropoda
- Class: Insecta
- Order: Lepidoptera
- Superfamily: Noctuoidea
- Family: Notodontidae
- Genus: Erbessa
- Species: E. semimarginata

Binomial name
- Erbessa semimarginata (Dognin, 1902)

Synonyms
- Dialephtis semimarginata Dognin, 1902; Dialephtis bicurvata Bastelberger, 1908

Species of moth

Erbessa semimarginata is a moth of the family Notodontidae first described by Paul Dognin in 1902. It is found from Panama south to Peru and Colombia.
