= Erbessa salvini =

Scientific classification
- Kingdom: Animalia
- Phylum: Arthropoda
- Clade: Pancrustacea
- Class: Insecta
- Order: Lepidoptera
- Superfamily: Noctuoidea
- Family: Notodontidae
- Genus: Erbessa
- Species: E. salvini

Binomial name
- Erbessa salvini (C. Felder & R. Felder, 1874)

Synonyms
- Dialephtis salvini C. Felder & R. Felder, 1874

Species of moth

Erbessa salvini is a moth of the family Notodontidae first described by Cajetan and Rudolf Felder in 1874. It is found in Guatemala, Nicaragua, Costa Rica and Panama.

The larvae feed on Henriettea tuberculosa.
