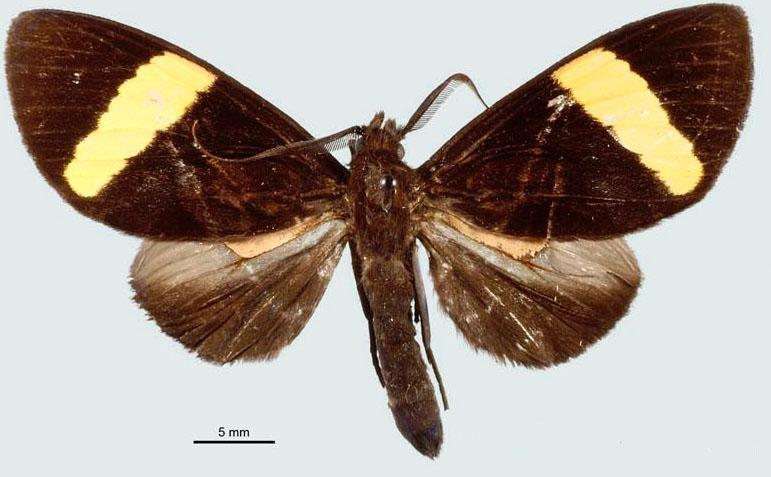

Scientific classification
- Kingdom: Animalia
- Phylum: Arthropoda
- Clade: Pancrustacea
- Class: Insecta
- Order: Lepidoptera
- Superfamily: Noctuoidea
- Family: Notodontidae
- Genus: Getta
- Species: G. unicolor

Binomial name
- Getta unicolor (Hering, 1925)

Synonyms
- Polyptychia unicolor Hering, 1925

= Getta unicolor =

Species of moth

Getta unicolor is a moth of the family Notodontidae. It is found in South America, including Peru, Ecuador, Colombia, Venezuela and Guyana.
