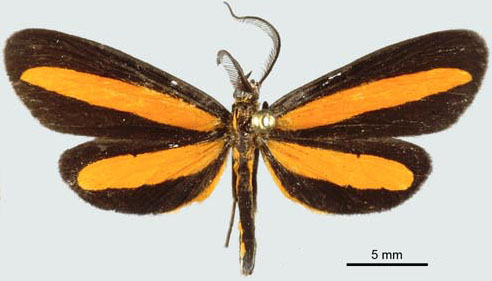

Scientific classification
- Kingdom: Animalia
- Phylum: Arthropoda
- Clade: Pancrustacea
- Class: Insecta
- Order: Lepidoptera
- Superfamily: Noctuoidea
- Family: Notodontidae
- Genus: Josia
- Species: J. ligula

Binomial name
- Josia ligula (Hübner, 1806)

Synonyms
- Hypocrita ligula Hübner, [1808]; Bombyx fulvia Cramer, 1779 (invalid - subsequent misidentification of Phalaena Noctua fulvia Linnaeus, 1758); Josia tenuivitta Butler 1878

= Josia ligula =

Species of moth

Josia ligula is a moth of the family Notodontidae. It is found in South America, on the lowlands of the Amazon basin, the Guiana shield, and the Atlantic coastal forest of Brazil.

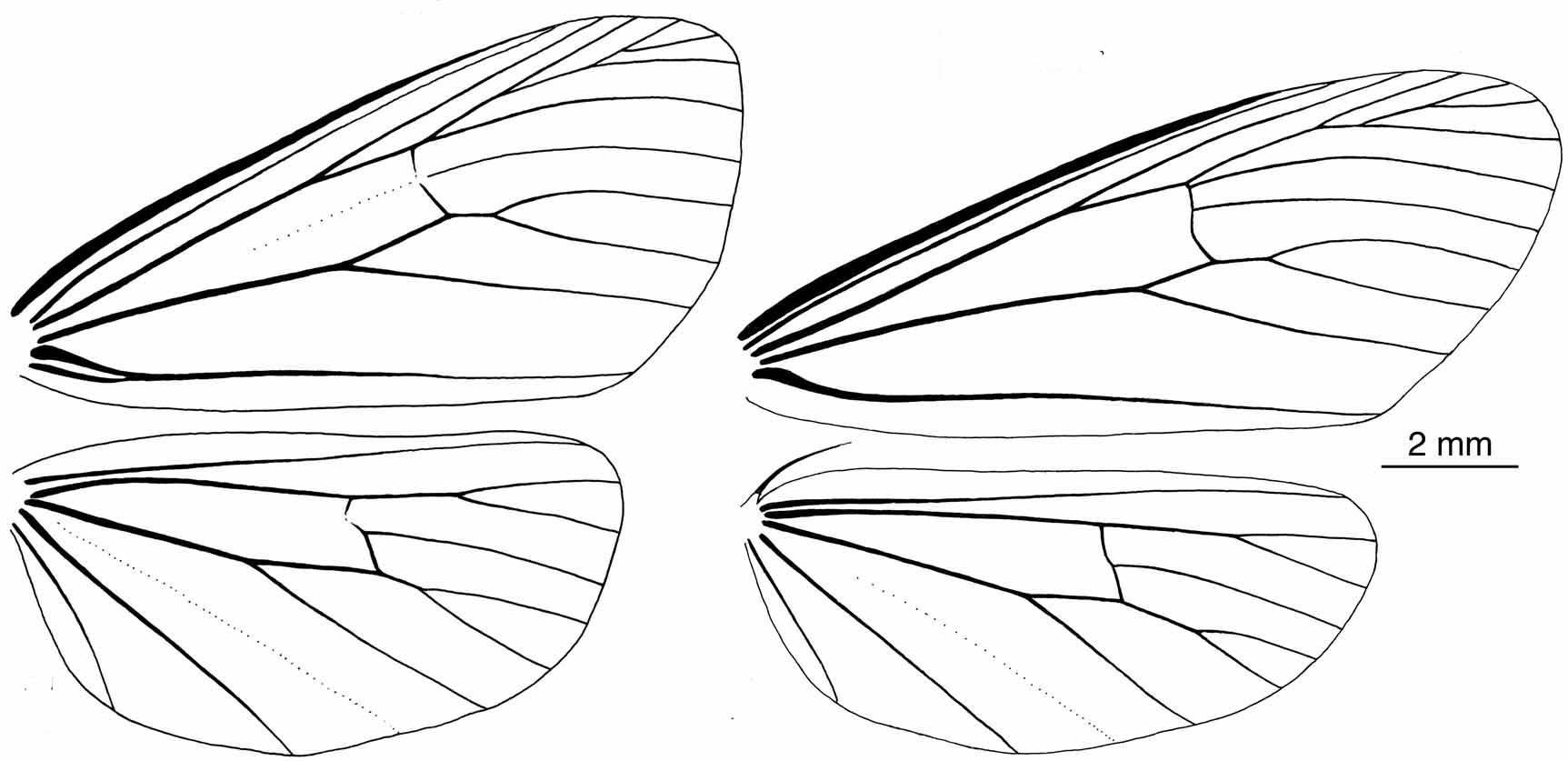
Wing venation of Josia mononeura (left) and Josia ligula (right)
