= Erbessa semiplaga =

Scientific classification
- Kingdom: Animalia
- Phylum: Arthropoda
- Class: Insecta
- Order: Lepidoptera
- Superfamily: Noctuoidea
- Family: Notodontidae
- Genus: Erbessa
- Species: E. semiplaga

Binomial name
- Erbessa semiplaga (Warren, 1905)

Synonyms
- Phelloe semiplaga Warren, 1905

Species of moth

Erbessa semiplaga is a moth of the family Notodontidae. It is found in Colombia.
