= Erbessa sobria =

Scientific classification
- Kingdom: Animalia
- Phylum: Arthropoda
- Class: Insecta
- Order: Lepidoptera
- Superfamily: Noctuoidea
- Family: Notodontidae
- Genus: Erbessa
- Species: E. sobria

Binomial name
- Erbessa sobria Walker, 1854

Synonyms
- Phelloe glaucaspis Walker, 1854

Species of moth

Erbessa sobria is a moth of the family Notodontidae first described by Francis Walker in 1854. It is found in Brazil, Ecuador, Colombia, Venezuela and Guyana.

The larvae feed on Miconia species.
