= Erbessa augusta =

Scientific classification
- Kingdom: Animalia
- Phylum: Arthropoda
- Class: Insecta
- Order: Lepidoptera
- Superfamily: Noctuoidea
- Family: Notodontidae
- Genus: Erbessa
- Species: E. augusta

Binomial name
- Erbessa augusta (Warren, 1909)

Synonyms
- Oricia augusta Warren, 1909

Species of moth

Erbessa augusta is a moth of the family Notodontidae first described by William Warren in 1909. It is found in Brazil and French Guiana.
