= Erbessa corvica =

Scientific classification
- Kingdom: Animalia
- Phylum: Arthropoda
- Class: Insecta
- Order: Lepidoptera
- Superfamily: Noctuoidea
- Family: Notodontidae
- Genus: Erbessa
- Species: E. corvica

Binomial name
- Erbessa corvica (Dognin, 1923)

Synonyms
- Myonia corvica Dognin, 1923; Myonia pleniplaga Prout, 1918

Species of moth

Erbessa corvica is a moth of the family Notodontidae first described by Paul Dognin in 1923. It is found in Bolivia.
