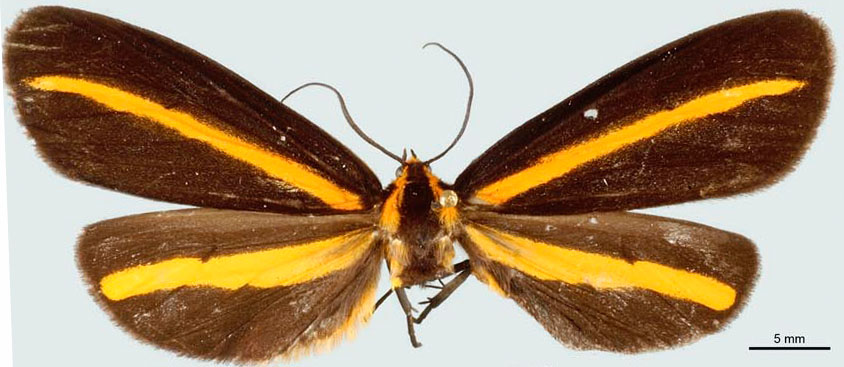

Scientific classification
- Kingdom: Animalia
- Phylum: Arthropoda
- Clade: Pancrustacea
- Class: Insecta
- Order: Lepidoptera
- Superfamily: Noctuoidea
- Family: Notodontidae
- Genus: Josia
- Species: J. neblina

Binomial name
- Josia neblina Miller, 2009

= Josia neblina =

Species of moth

Josia neblina is a moth of the family Notodontidae. It is only known from Cerro Neblina in southern Venezuela.
