= Erbessa lamasi =

Scientific classification
- Kingdom: Animalia
- Phylum: Arthropoda
- Clade: Pancrustacea
- Class: Insecta
- Order: Lepidoptera
- Superfamily: Noctuoidea
- Family: Notodontidae
- Genus: Erbessa
- Species: E. lamasi

Binomial name
- Erbessa lamasi Miller, 2008

Species of moth

Erbessa lamasi is a moth of the family Notodontidae first described by James S. Miller in 2008. The length of the forewings is 16 mm in males. It has a dark coppery-brown forewing with a dark gray underside. The hindwing coloration is unusual for its genus, with a spotless white center and a broad charcoal-gray border along the edges. It is known only from its type locality, the Cosñipata Valley of Cusco Department in Peru. It is known from an elevation of 1,020 m (3,350 ft). Caterpillars of this moth are thought to feed on Miconia species.

== Taxonomy ==
Erbessa lamasi was formally described by the American entomologist James S. Miller in 2008 based on a male collected from the Cosñipata Valley in Peru. The species is named after Gerardo Lamas Müller, a Peruvian entomologist who was part of the trip that collected the holotype of E. lamasi.

== Description ==
The length of the forewings is 16 mm in males. The forewing is dark coppery-brown above and dark gray below. The hindwing is spotless white centrally with a broad, somewhat shiny charcoal-gray border along its edges. The underside of the hindwing has much the same pattern, but with the border being grayish-black and having a white spot near the tip of the hindwing.

Erbessa lamasi is distinguished from most of its genus by the whitish center to the hindwing, a feature shared with E. avara, E. sobria, and E. conigera. It can be distinguished from these species by the color of the forewings and the vertex.

== Distribution and habitat ==
Erbessa lamasi has been recorded only from its type locality, the stream Quebrada Quita Calzón in the Cosñipata Valley of Cusco Department in Peru. The species differs from most other Erbessa, which usually occur at elevations below 500 m (1,600 ft), in being found at an elevation of 1,020 m (3,350 ft).

Caterpillars of this moth are thought to feed on Miconia species based on the feeding habits of closely related species, but no host has been confirmed.
