= Erbessa citrina =

Scientific classification
- Kingdom: Animalia
- Phylum: Arthropoda
- Class: Insecta
- Order: Lepidoptera
- Superfamily: Noctuoidea
- Family: Notodontidae
- Genus: Erbessa
- Species: E. citrina

Binomial name
- Erbessa citrina H. Druce, 1898

Synonyms
- Neolaurona citrina H. Druce, 1898; Neolaurona conjuncta Dognin, 1910

Species of moth

Erbessa citrina is a moth of the family Notodontidae first described by Herbert Druce in 1898. It is found in Peru, Venezuela, French Guiana and Brazil.
