= Erbessa longiplaga =

Scientific classification
- Kingdom: Animalia
- Phylum: Arthropoda
- Class: Insecta
- Order: Lepidoptera
- Superfamily: Noctuoidea
- Family: Notodontidae
- Genus: Erbessa
- Species: E. longiplaga

Binomial name
- Erbessa longiplaga (Warren, 1907)

Synonyms
- Paratryia longiplaga Warren, 1907

Species of moth

Erbessa longiplaga is a moth of the family Notodontidae first described by William Warren in 1907. It is found in Brazil.
