= Erbessa papula =

Scientific classification
- Kingdom: Animalia
- Phylum: Arthropoda
- Class: Insecta
- Order: Lepidoptera
- Superfamily: Noctuoidea
- Family: Notodontidae
- Genus: Erbessa
- Species: E. papula

Binomial name
- Erbessa papula (Dognin, 1923)

Synonyms
- Myonia papula Dognin, 1923

Species of moth

Erbessa papula is a moth of the family Notodontidae first described by Paul Dognin in 1923. It is found in Brazil and Venezuela.
