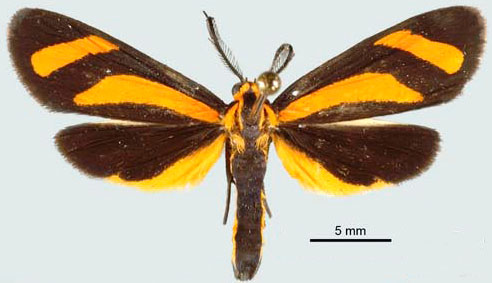

Scientific classification
- Kingdom: Animalia
- Phylum: Arthropoda
- Clade: Pancrustacea
- Class: Insecta
- Order: Lepidoptera
- Superfamily: Noctuoidea
- Family: Notodontidae
- Genus: Josia
- Species: J. integra

Binomial name
- Josia integra (Walker, 1854)

Synonyms
- List: Phalcidon (Josia) integra Walker, 1854; Josia decorata Druce, 1885; Phalcidon integra Walker, 1854; Josia megaera integra (Walker, 1854)

= Josia integra =

Species of moth

Josia integra is a species of moth in the family Notodontidae. It is found in southern Mexico and Belize.
