= Erbessa seducta =

Scientific classification
- Kingdom: Animalia
- Phylum: Arthropoda
- Clade: Pancrustacea
- Class: Insecta
- Order: Lepidoptera
- Superfamily: Noctuoidea
- Family: Notodontidae
- Genus: Erbessa
- Species: E. seducta

Binomial name
- Erbessa seducta (L. B. Prout, 1918)

Synonyms
- Myonia seducta Prout, 1918

Species of moth

Erbessa seducta is a moth of the family Notodontidae first described by Louis Beethoven Prout in 1918. It is found in Venezuela.

The length of the forewings is 15–16 mm.
