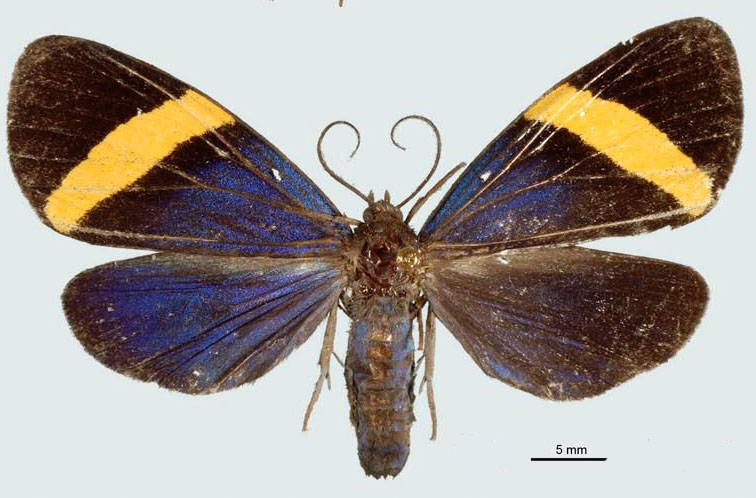

Scientific classification
- Kingdom: Animalia
- Phylum: Arthropoda
- Clade: Pancrustacea
- Class: Insecta
- Order: Lepidoptera
- Superfamily: Noctuoidea
- Family: Notodontidae
- Genus: Getta
- Species: G. turrenti

Binomial name
- Getta turrenti J.S. Miller, 2009

= Getta turrenti =

Species of moth

Getta turrenti is a moth of the family Notodontidae. It is found in southeastern Mexico (Veracruz, Chiapas) and Guatemala.
