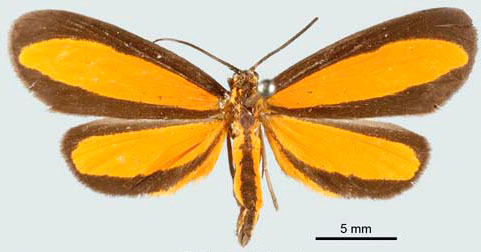

Scientific classification
- Kingdom: Animalia
- Phylum: Arthropoda
- Clade: Pancrustacea
- Class: Insecta
- Order: Lepidoptera
- Superfamily: Noctuoidea
- Family: Notodontidae
- Genus: Josia
- Species: J. oribia

Binomial name
- Josia oribia H. Druce, 1885

Synonyms
- Josia schnusei Strand, 1920

= Josia oribia =

Species of moth

Josia oribia is a moth of the family Notodontidae first described by Herbert Druce in 1885. It is found in the eastern Andean foothills of Peru and Bolivia.

It is engaged in Müllerian mimicry with Erbessa mimica.
