= Erbessa tapajoza =

Scientific classification
- Kingdom: Animalia
- Phylum: Arthropoda
- Class: Insecta
- Order: Lepidoptera
- Superfamily: Noctuoidea
- Family: Notodontidae
- Genus: Erbessa
- Species: E. tapajoza

Binomial name
- Erbessa tapajoza (Dognin, 1923)

Synonyms
- Myonia tapajoza Dognin, 1923

Species of moth

Erbessa tapajoza is a moth of the family Notodontidae first described by Paul Dognin in 1923. It is found in Brazil.
