= Erbessa josia =

Scientific classification
- Kingdom: Animalia
- Phylum: Arthropoda
- Class: Insecta
- Order: Lepidoptera
- Superfamily: Noctuoidea
- Family: Notodontidae
- Genus: Erbessa
- Species: E. josia

Binomial name
- Erbessa josia (C. Felder & R. Felder, 1862)

Synonyms
- Phaeochlaena josia C. Felder & R. Felder, 1862

Species of moth

Erbessa josia is a moth of the family Notodontidae first described by Cajetan and Rudolf Felder in 1862. It is found in Brazil.
