= Erbessa evippe =

Scientific classification
- Kingdom: Animalia
- Phylum: Arthropoda
- Class: Insecta
- Order: Lepidoptera
- Superfamily: Noctuoidea
- Family: Notodontidae
- Genus: Erbessa
- Species: E. evippe

Binomial name
- Erbessa evippe (Walker, 1854)

Synonyms
- Josia evippe Walker, 1854; Myonia assimilis Hering, 1925; Oricia imitatrix Warren, 1909

Species of moth

Erbessa euryzona is a moth of the family Notodontidae first described by Francis Walker in 1854. It is found in Brazil, Colombia, Venezuela, Ecuador and Peru.
