= Erbessa labana =

Scientific classification
- Kingdom: Animalia
- Phylum: Arthropoda
- Class: Insecta
- Order: Lepidoptera
- Superfamily: Noctuoidea
- Family: Notodontidae
- Genus: Erbessa
- Species: E. labana

Binomial name
- Erbessa labana (H. Druce, 1895)

Synonyms
- Getta labana H. Druce, 1899; Myonia attingens Prout, 1918; Myonia pravesignata Prout, 1918; Myonia simplificata Prout, 1918; Myonia subalba Hering, 1925

Species of moth

Erbessa labana is a moth of the family Notodontidae first described by Herbert Druce in 1895. It is found in Venezuela, Ecuador, Peru and Brazil.
