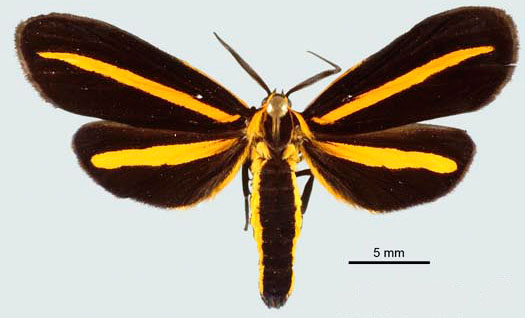

Scientific classification
- Kingdom: Animalia
- Phylum: Arthropoda
- Clade: Pancrustacea
- Class: Insecta
- Order: Lepidoptera
- Superfamily: Noctuoidea
- Family: Notodontidae
- Genus: Josia
- Species: J. frigida

Binomial name
- Josia frigida H. Druce, 1885

Synonyms
- Josia fulvia H. Druce, 1885

= Josia frigida =

Species of moth

Josia frigida is a moth of the family Notodontidae first described by Herbert Druce in 1885. It is found from Panama and Guatemala to southern Mexico. Its larvae have been reared on Passiflora costaricensis and Passiflora quinquangularis.
