= Erbessa leechi =

Scientific classification
- Kingdom: Animalia
- Phylum: Arthropoda
- Clade: Pancrustacea
- Class: Insecta
- Order: Lepidoptera
- Superfamily: Noctuoidea
- Family: Notodontidae
- Genus: Erbessa
- Species: E. leechi

Binomial name
- Erbessa leechi (L. B. Prout, 1918)

Synonyms
- Myonia leechi Prout, 1918; Scotura longipalpata Dognin, 1923

Species of moth

Erbessa leechi is a moth of the family Notodontidae first described by Louis Beethoven Prout in 1918. It is found in Brazil and French Guiana.
