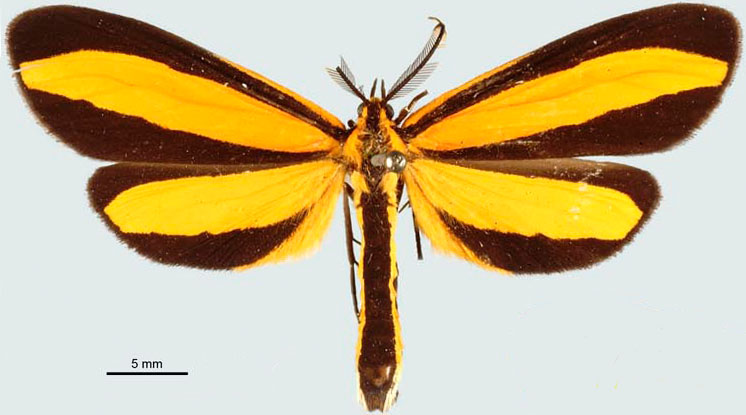

Scientific classification
- Kingdom: Animalia
- Phylum: Arthropoda
- Clade: Pancrustacea
- Class: Insecta
- Order: Lepidoptera
- Superfamily: Noctuoidea
- Family: Notodontidae
- Genus: Josia
- Species: J. fusigera

Binomial name
- Josia fusigera Walker, 1864

Synonyms
- Josia fusifera Druce, 1885; Josia flexuosa Hering, 1925; Josia flexuosa diminuata Hering, 1925

= Josia fusigera =

Species of moth

Josia fusigera is a moth of the family Notodontidae. It is found from southern Mexico to Nicaragua.
