= Erbessa maera =

Scientific classification
- Kingdom: Animalia
- Phylum: Arthropoda
- Class: Insecta
- Order: Lepidoptera
- Superfamily: Noctuoidea
- Family: Notodontidae
- Genus: Erbessa
- Species: E. maera

Binomial name
- Erbessa maera (Schaus, 1892)

Synonyms
- Lyces maera Schaus, 1892

Species of moth

Erbessa maera is a moth of the family Notodontidae first described by William Schaus in 1892. It is found in Brazil.

It is a close mimic of Lyces angulosa.
