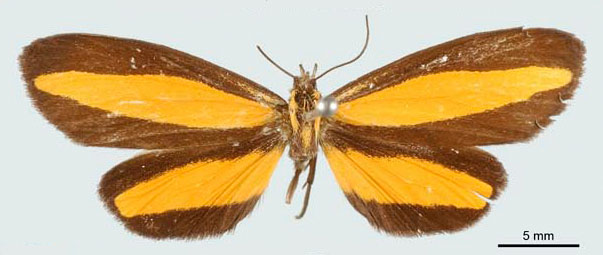
- Erbessa mimica

Scientific classification
- Kingdom: Animalia
- Phylum: Arthropoda
- Clade: Pancrustacea
- Class: Insecta
- Order: Lepidoptera
- Superfamily: Noctuoidea
- Family: Notodontidae
- Tribe: Dioptini
- Genus: Erbessa; Walker, 1854

Synonyms
- Myonia Walker, 1854; Glissa Walker, 1864

= Erbessa =

Genus of moths

Erbessa is a genus of moths of the family Notodontidae. It is found in the lowlands of the Neotropics, usually at elevations of 100–500 m (330–1,640 ft), but sometimes as high as 1,800 m (5,900 ft). Moths in this genus are colorful and striking with bright orange-yellow to metallic blue wings. The length of the forewings is 11.0–26.0 mm for males and 12.5–30.0 mm for females. The host ecology of the genus is very poorly known, with hosts documented for only 10 species, but the genus seems to depend on Melastomataceae plants, especially those in the genus Miconia.

== Taxonomy ==
The genus Erbessa was erected by the English entomologist Francis Walker in 1854 for the species Dioptis sobria. The genus has not been divided into species groups due to the absence of male specimens in many specimens and the homogeneity of both male and female genitalia across the genus.

== Description ==
Erbessa is a genus of colorful and striking moths with a variety of wing colors, from bright orange-yellow to metallic blue. Species in this genus have long labial palps, long and thin antennae, and big eyes. The ventral The abdomen is long in males and thick in females. The length of the forewings is 11.0–26.0 mm for males and 12.5–30.0 mm for females.

== Distribution and habitat ==
The genus is found in the lowlands of the Neotropics, with a range that largely tracks with that of the genus Miconia, on which its caterpillars feed. Most species occur at elevations of 100–500 m (330–1,640 ft), but E. corvica can be found as high as 1,800 m (5,900 ft). The host ecology of the genus is very poorly known, with hosts documented for only 10 species, but the genus seems to depend on Melastomataceae plants, especially those in the genus Miconia. Two species are also known to feed on Myrtaceae such as Eugenia valerii and non-native Eucalyptus.

== Species ==
Erbessa is the second-largest genus in its subfamily and has over 60 described species. The following species have been described as of 2008:

- Erbessa albilinea Miller, 2008
- Erbessa alea (Druce, 1890)
- Erbessa augusta (Warren, 1909)
- Erbessa avara (Druce, 1899)
- Erbessa basivitta (Prout, 1918)
- Erbessa biplagiata (Warren, 1897)
- Erbessa capena Druce, 1885
- Erbessa cassandra (Druce, 1885)
- Erbessa celata (Warren, 1906)
- Erbessa cingulina (Druce, 1885)
- Erbessa citrina Druce, 1898
- Erbessa clite (Walker, 1854)
- Erbessa conigera (Prout, 1918)
- Erbessa continens (Prout, 1918)
- Erbessa corvica (Dognin, 1923)
- Erbessa cuneiplaga (Prout, 1918)
- Erbessa decolorata (Hering, 1925)
- Erbessa depravata (Hering, 1925)
- Erbessa desmotrichoides (Hering, 1925)
- Erbessa dominula (Warren, 1909)
- Erbessa euryzona (Prout, 1922)
- Erbessa evippe (Walker, 1854)
- Erbessa evippoides (Hering, 1925)
- Erbessa graba (Druce, 1899)
- Erbessa inaria (Druce, 1885)
- Erbessa integra (C. and R. Felder, 1874)
- Erbessa josia (C. and R. Felder, 1862)
- Erbessa labana (Druce, 1895)
- Erbessa lamasi Miller, 2008
- Erbessa leechi (Prout, 1918)
- Erbessa lindigii (C. and R. Felder, 1874)
- Erbessa longiplaga (Warren, 1907)
- Erbessa macropoecila (Hering, 1925)
- Erbessa maera (Schaus, 1892)
- Erbessa mimica (Hering, 1925)
- Erbessa mitys (Druce, 1899)
- Erbessa ovia (Druce, 1893)
- Erbessa pales (Druce, 1893)
- Erbessa papula (Dognin, 1923)
- Erbessa primula (Dognin, 1919)
- Erbessa priverna (Cramer, 1777)
- Erbessa projecta (Warren, 1909)
- Erbessa prolifera (Walker, 1854)
- Erbessa prouti (Hering, 1925)
- Erbessa pyraloides (Walker, 1854)
- Erbessa quadricolor (Walker, 1856)
- Erbessa regis (Hering, 1925)
- Erbessa saga (Hering, 1925)
- Erbessa salvini (C. and R. Felder, 1874)
- Erbessa seducta (Prout, 1918)
- Erbessa semimarginata (Dognin, 1902)
- Erbessa semiplaga (Warren, 1905)
- Erbessa sobria Walker, 1854
- Erbessa stroudi Miller, 2008
- Erbessa tapajoza (Dognin, 1923)
- Erbessa tegyroides Miller, 2008
- Erbessa thiaucourti Miller, 2008
- Erbessa umbrifera (Walker, 1854)
- Erbessa unimacula (Warren, 1907)
- Erbessa ursula (Hering, 1925)
