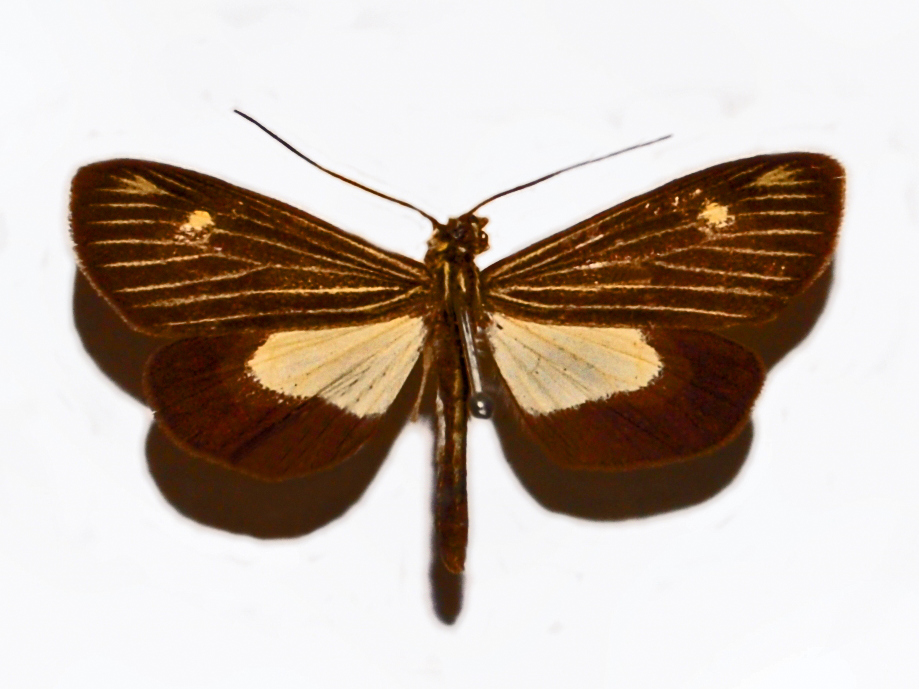
- On display at the Museo Civico di Storia Naturale di Trieste

Scientific classification
- Kingdom: Animalia
- Phylum: Arthropoda
- Class: Insecta
- Order: Lepidoptera
- Superfamily: Noctuoidea
- Family: Notodontidae
- Genus: Erbessa
- Species: E. cingulina

Binomial name
- Erbessa cingulina (H. Druce, 1885)

Synonyms
- Phaeochlaena cingulina H. Druce, 1885; Stenoplastis albifrons Warren, 1904; Phaeochlaena aurantica H. Druce, 1885; Myonia quadriguttata Hering, 1925; Stenoplastis semimaculata Warren, 1904; Stenoplastis spumata Warren, 1904; Myonia stenoxantha Hering, 1925

= Erbessa cingulina =

Species of moth

Erbessa cingulina is a moth of the family Notodontidae first described by Herbert Druce in 1885.

== Description ==
Erbessa cingulina has a wingspan of about 38 millimetres (1.5 in). The species has a high wing-pattern variability. Usually forewings are deep black, with all the nerves ochraceous brown and an oval spot at the end of the cell. Hindwings are creamy white with the margins broadly banded with black. The abdomen with a central streak and one on each side bright yellow.

== Distribution ==
This species can be found from northern Bolivia north to central Peru, along the eastern slope of the Andes.
