= Erbessa alea =

Scientific classification
- Kingdom: Animalia
- Phylum: Arthropoda
- Clade: Pancrustacea
- Class: Insecta
- Order: Lepidoptera
- Superfamily: Noctuoidea
- Family: Notodontidae
- Genus: Erbessa
- Species: E. alea

Binomial name
- Erbessa alea (H. Druce, 1890)

Synonyms
- Microgiton alea H. Druce, 1890

Species of moth

Erbessa alea is a moth of the family Notodontidae first described by Herbert Druce in 1890. It is found in Ecuador.

Adults exhibit sexual dimorphism in wing pattern. The yellow forewings area is distally acute in males, but is rounded at its apex in females.

== Taxonomy ==
The species was originally described by British entomologist Herbert Druce in 1890 under the basionym (original combination) Microgiton alea, with its type locality specified as Sarayacu, Ecuador.
