= Erbessa unimacula =

Scientific classification
- Kingdom: Animalia
- Phylum: Arthropoda
- Clade: Pancrustacea
- Class: Insecta
- Order: Lepidoptera
- Superfamily: Noctuoidea
- Family: Notodontidae
- Genus: Erbessa
- Species: E. unimacula

Binomial name
- Erbessa unimacula (Warren, 1907)

Synonyms
- Phaeochlaena unimacula Warren, 1907

Species of moth

Erbessa unimacula is a moth of the family Notodontidae first described by William Warren in 1907. It is found in Peru and Bolivia.
