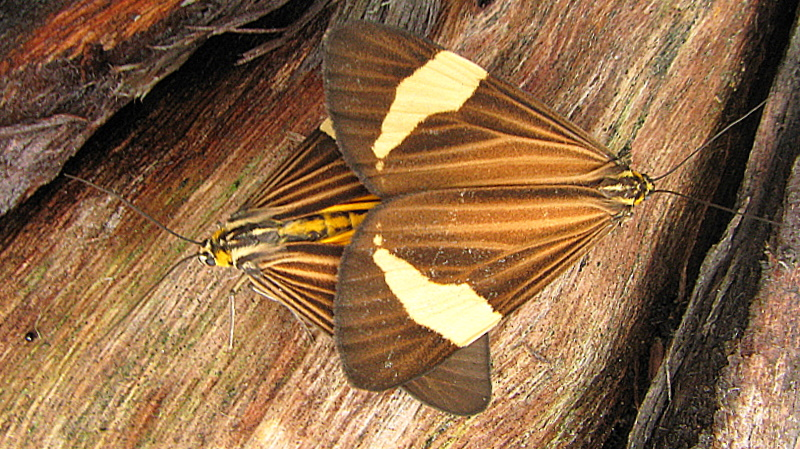

Scientific classification
- Kingdom: Animalia
- Phylum: Arthropoda
- Class: Insecta
- Order: Lepidoptera
- Superfamily: Noctuoidea
- Family: Notodontidae
- Genus: Erbessa
- Species: E. priverna

Binomial name
- Erbessa priverna (Cramer, 1777)

Synonyms
- Phalaena Noctua priverna Cramer, 1777

= Erbessa priverna =

Species of moth

Erbessa priverna is a moth of the family Notodontidae first described by Pieter Cramer in 1777. It is found in northern South America, extending as far west as central Venezuela. It also occurs south into Brazil.

The length of the forewings reaches up to 25 mm for females.
