= Erbessa mitys =

Scientific classification
- Kingdom: Animalia
- Phylum: Arthropoda
- Class: Insecta
- Order: Lepidoptera
- Superfamily: Noctuoidea
- Family: Notodontidae
- Genus: Erbessa
- Species: E. mitys

Binomial name
- Erbessa mitys (H. Druce, 1899)

Synonyms
- Myonia mitys H. Druce, 1899

Species of moth

Erbessa mitys is a moth of the family Notodontidae first described by Herbert Druce in 1899. It is found in Brazil, French Guiana and Venezuela.
