= Esther Edigin =

Nigerian jurist and Former Chief Judge of Edo State

Honorable Esther Amenaghawon Edigin

Chief Judge of Edo State
- In office 22 November 2019 – 17 May 2021
- Appointed by: Godwin Obaseki
- Preceded by: Esohe Frances Ikponmwen
- Succeeded by: Joe Acha

Personal details
- Born: 17 May 1956 (age 69) Edo, Nigeria
- Profession: Judge

Esther Edigin is a Nigerian jurist who served as the Chief Judge of Edo State from 22 November 2019 to 17 May 2021. She was succeeded by Joe Acha as Acting Chief Judge on 19 May 2021 before his confirmation as substantive Chief Judge on 6 October 2021.

== Early life and education ==
Edigin was born on 17 May 1956, into the family of Mr. Emmanuel Egiebor Eribo of Idunogba, Orhionmwon Local Government Area. She attended St. Mathias Primary School, Okesuna, Lagos (1961–1963), followed by A.D.R.A.O. International School and Corona School, Victoria Island, Lagos, where she earned her Primary School Leaving Certificate in 1968. She attended Federal Government College, Warri (1969–1973) and proceeded to Idia College, Benin City, for her higher school certificate (1973–1975).

In 1975, she was admitted to the University of Lagos, where she studied law. Upon graduation, she was called to the Nigerian Bar on 17 July 1979, and subsequently completed her National Youth Service Corps posting at the Public Complaints Commission, Ikoyi, Lagos.

== Career ==
Edigin began her legal career in private practice, working with F.O. Akinrele & Co. (SAN) in Lagos and briefly with Buba Aliyu & Co. in Kano State (1980–1981). Leveraging her experience, she transitioned into the judiciary as a Magistrate Grade I in Kano State. By 1988, she had advanced to Chief Magistrate Grade II (on contract). In September 1989, she joined the Bendel State Judiciary as Chief Magistrate Grade II, earning promotion to Chief Magistrate Grade I in 1993.

In 1998, she served on Election Petition Tribunals for both the National Assembly and the State Legislative House in Enugu State, and in 1999, for the governorship elections in Bayelsa State. That same year, she was appointed Deputy Chief Registrar (Administration) and later Chief Registrar of the Edo State High Court.

Her judicial trajectory continued upward when she was appointed a High Court Judge in 2001, serving across multiple judicial divisions in Edo State.

=== Chief Judge of Edo State ===
Edigin was sworn in as the seventh substantive Chief Judge of Edo State on 22 November 2019, succeeding Justice Esohe Ikponmwen. The swearing-in was conducted by Governor Godwin Obaseki at the Government House in Benin City.

=== Retirement ===
Edigin retired on 17 May 2021, upon reaching the mandatory retirement age of 65 for judicial officers in Nigeria. Following her retirement, Justice Joe Itsebaga Acha assumed the role of Acting Chief Judge and later substantive Chief Judge of Edo State.

== Personal life ==
Edigin married Martin Sunday Edigin in 1977. They have children and grandchildren.
