= Ovia (name) =

Ovia is a name. It may refer to:

== Given name ==
- Ovia Idah (1903–1968), Nigerian sculptor, painter, carpenter, designer, and educator

== Surname ==
- Jim Ovia (born 1951), Nigerian businessman
- John Ovia (born 1976), Papua New Guinean former cricketer
- Lucy Ovia (born 1967), Papua New Guinean former women's cricketer

== Religion ==
- Ovia, a deity of the Edo people in Nigeria
