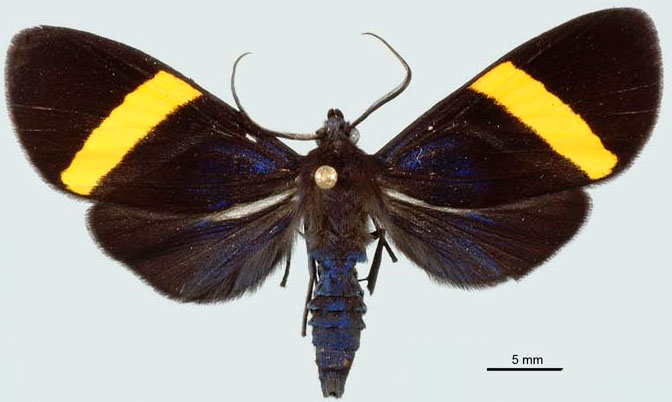

Scientific classification
- Kingdom: Animalia
- Phylum: Arthropoda
- Clade: Pancrustacea
- Class: Insecta
- Order: Lepidoptera
- Superfamily: Noctuoidea
- Family: Notodontidae
- Genus: Getta
- Species: G. tica

Binomial name
- Getta tica J.S. Miller, 2009

= Getta tica =

Species of moth

Getta tica is a moth of the family Notodontidae. It is found in Panama and Costa Rica.

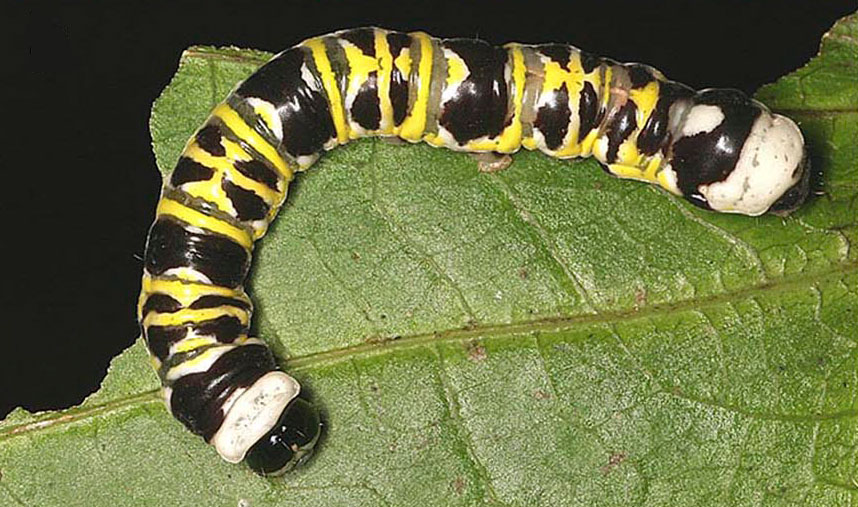
Larva

Larvae have been reared on Passiflora tica.
