= Erbessa ovia =

Scientific classification
- Kingdom: Animalia
- Phylum: Arthropoda
- Class: Insecta
- Order: Lepidoptera
- Superfamily: Noctuoidea
- Family: Notodontidae
- Genus: Erbessa
- Species: E. ovia

Binomial name
- Erbessa ovia (H. Druce, 1893)

Synonyms
- Neolaurona ovia H. Druce, 1893

Species of moth

Erbessa ovia is a moth of the family Notodontidae first described by Herbert Druce in 1893. It is found in Ecuador, Peru and Brazil.
