= Erbessa lindigii =

Scientific classification
- Kingdom: Animalia
- Phylum: Arthropoda
- Class: Insecta
- Order: Lepidoptera
- Superfamily: Noctuoidea
- Family: Notodontidae
- Genus: Erbessa
- Species: E. lindigii

Binomial name
- Erbessa lindigii (C. Felder & R. Felder, 1874)

Synonyms
- Phelloe lindigii C. Felder & R. Felder, 1874

Species of moth

Erbessa lindigii is a moth of the family Notodontidae first described by Cajetan and Rudolf Felder in 1874. It is found in Colombia and Panama.

The larvae feed on Miconia impetiolaris, Henriettea and Conostegia species.
