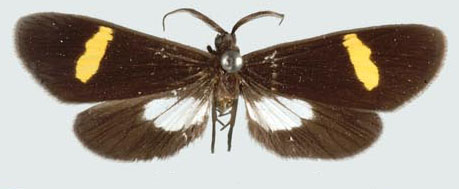

Scientific classification
- Kingdom: Animalia
- Phylum: Arthropoda
- Clade: Pancrustacea
- Class: Insecta
- Order: Lepidoptera
- Superfamily: Noctuoidea
- Family: Notodontidae
- Genus: Proutiella
- Species: P. tegyra

Binomial name
- Proutiella tegyra (Druce, 1899)

Synonyms
- Josia tegyra Druce, 1899; Josia (Phintia) tessmanni Hering, 1925

= Proutiella tegyra =

Species of moth

Proutiella tegyra is a moth of the family Notodontidae. It is found in lowland forests of western Amazonia in South America, including Brazil, Ecuador and Peru.
