= Erbessa regis =

Scientific classification
- Kingdom: Animalia
- Phylum: Arthropoda
- Class: Insecta
- Order: Lepidoptera
- Superfamily: Noctuoidea
- Family: Notodontidae
- Genus: Erbessa
- Species: E. regis

Binomial name
- Erbessa regis (Hering, 1925)

Synonyms
- Myonia regis Hering, 1925

Species of moth

Erbessa regis is a moth of the family Notodontidae first described by Hering in 1925. It is widely distributed across the upper Amazon basin, from Bolivia north to Ecuador.
