= Ovia =

Scientific classification
- Kingdom: Animalia
- Phylum: Arthropoda
- Subphylum: Chelicerata
- Class: Arachnida
- Order: Araneae
- Infraorder: Araneomorphae
- Family: Lycosidae
- Genus: Ovia; Sankaran, Malamel & Sebastian, 2017

Species
- See text.

Genus of spiders

Ovia is a genus of arameomorph spiders that belongs to the family Lycosidae. Members of this genus are distributed across Southeast Asia and Southern China.

This genus was first described in 2017 by Sankaran, Malamel and Sebastian with Ovia procurva being the type species.

As of May 2026, this genus contains 10 described species:

- Ovia alboannulata (Yin, Peng, Xie, Bao & Wang, 1997) – Bhutan, China
- Ovia chayu Xu, Wang & Zhang, 2026 Xizang, China
- Ovia dawai Xu, Wang & Zhang, 2026 Xizang, China
- Ovia dulong Xu, Wang & Zhang, 2026 Xizang, China
- Ovia emae Buchar & Dolejš, 2021 – Bhutan
- Ovia macritchie Lu, Koh, Zhang & Li, 2018 – China (Hainan), Laos, Singapore
- Ovia medog Xu, Wang & Zhang, 2026 Xizang, China
- Ovia procurva (Yu & Song, 1988) (type species) – India, Bhutan, China, Taiwan
- Ovia seperata Xu, Wang & Zhang, 2026 Guangdong and Yunnan, China
- Ovia quinquedens (Dhali, Roy, Sen, Saha & Raychaudhuri, 2012) – India
