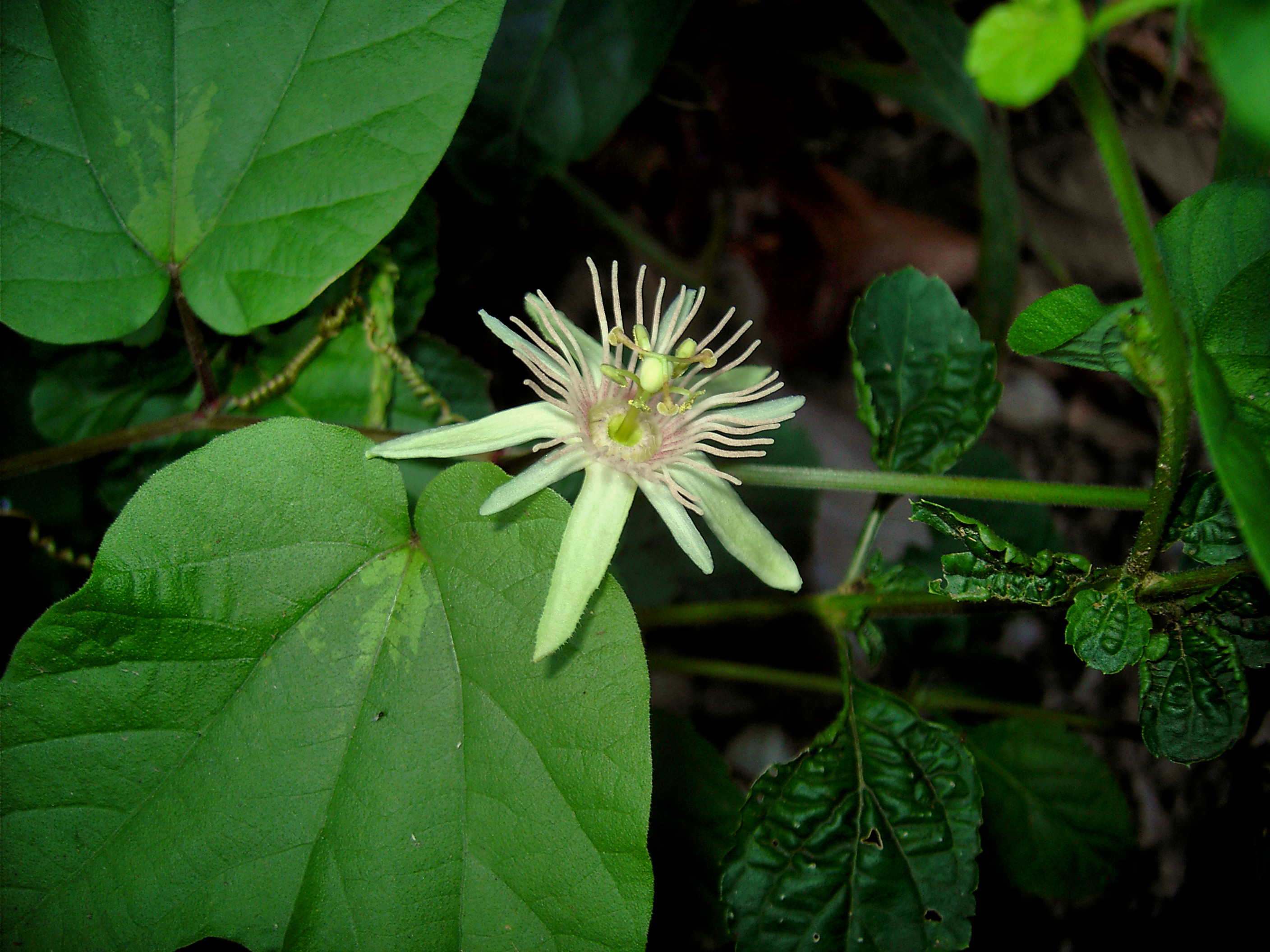
- Flower
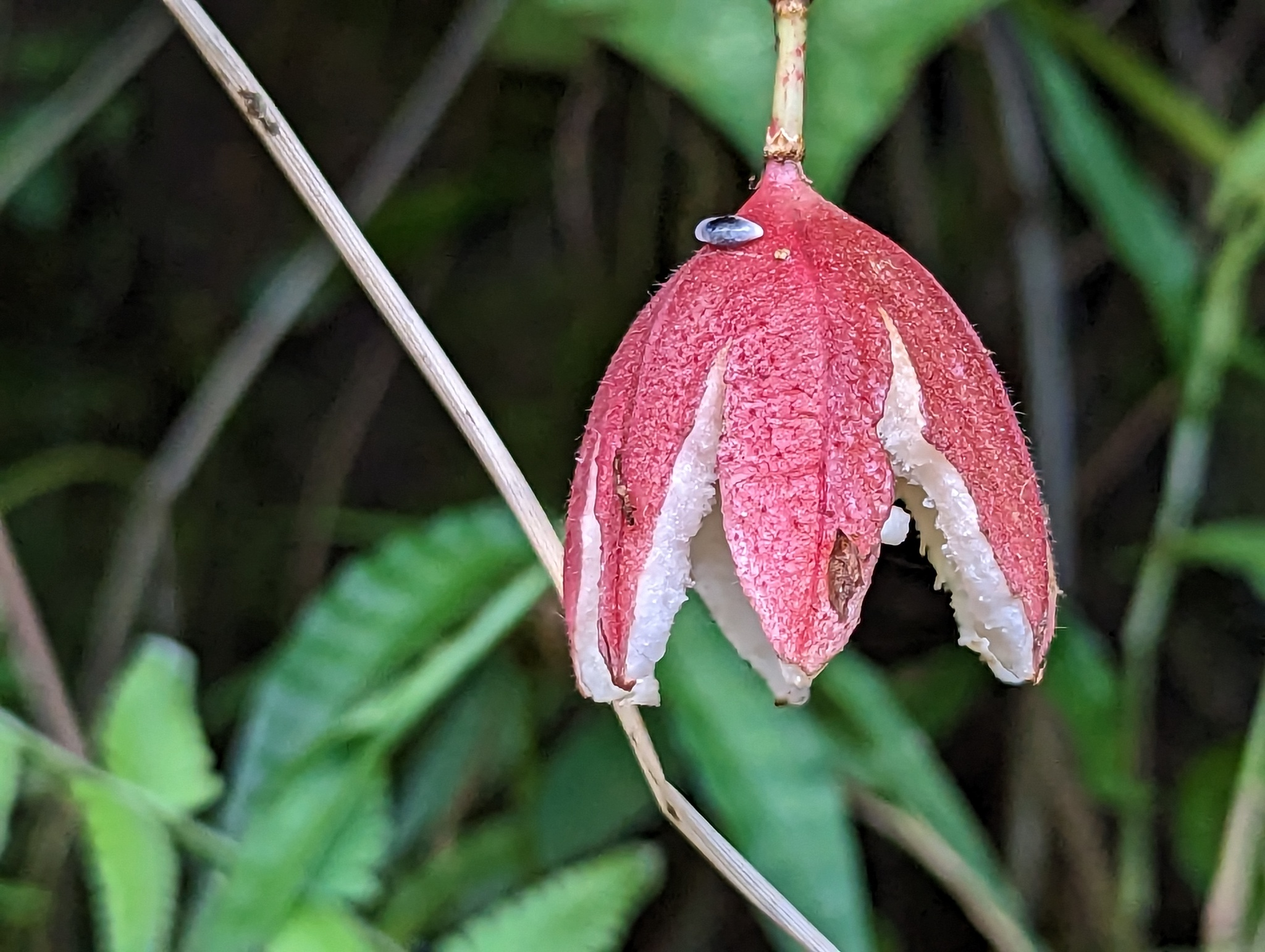
- Fruit

Scientific classification
- Kingdom: Plantae
- Clade: Tracheophytes
- Clade: Angiosperms
- Clade: Eudicots
- Clade: Rosids
- Order: Malpighiales
- Family: Passifloraceae
- Genus: Passiflora
- Species: P. rubra

Binomial name
- Passiflora rubra L.

= Passiflora rubra =

Species of vine

Passiflora rubra, the Dutchman's laudanum, is a species in the family Passifloraceae. It is native throughout the West Indies, and to Colombia, Venezuela, Peru, Ecuador, Bolivia and eastern Brazil.

Passiflora rubra is vegetatively almost indistinguishable from Passiflora capsularis, but the two species may be distinguished in flower and fruit. The ovaries of the flowers of Passiflora rubra has a dense coating of white, or less commonly brownish hairs, and the fruit, while variable in shape, is always obovoid, unlike that of Passiflora capsularis which is tapering at both ends.

== Gallery ==
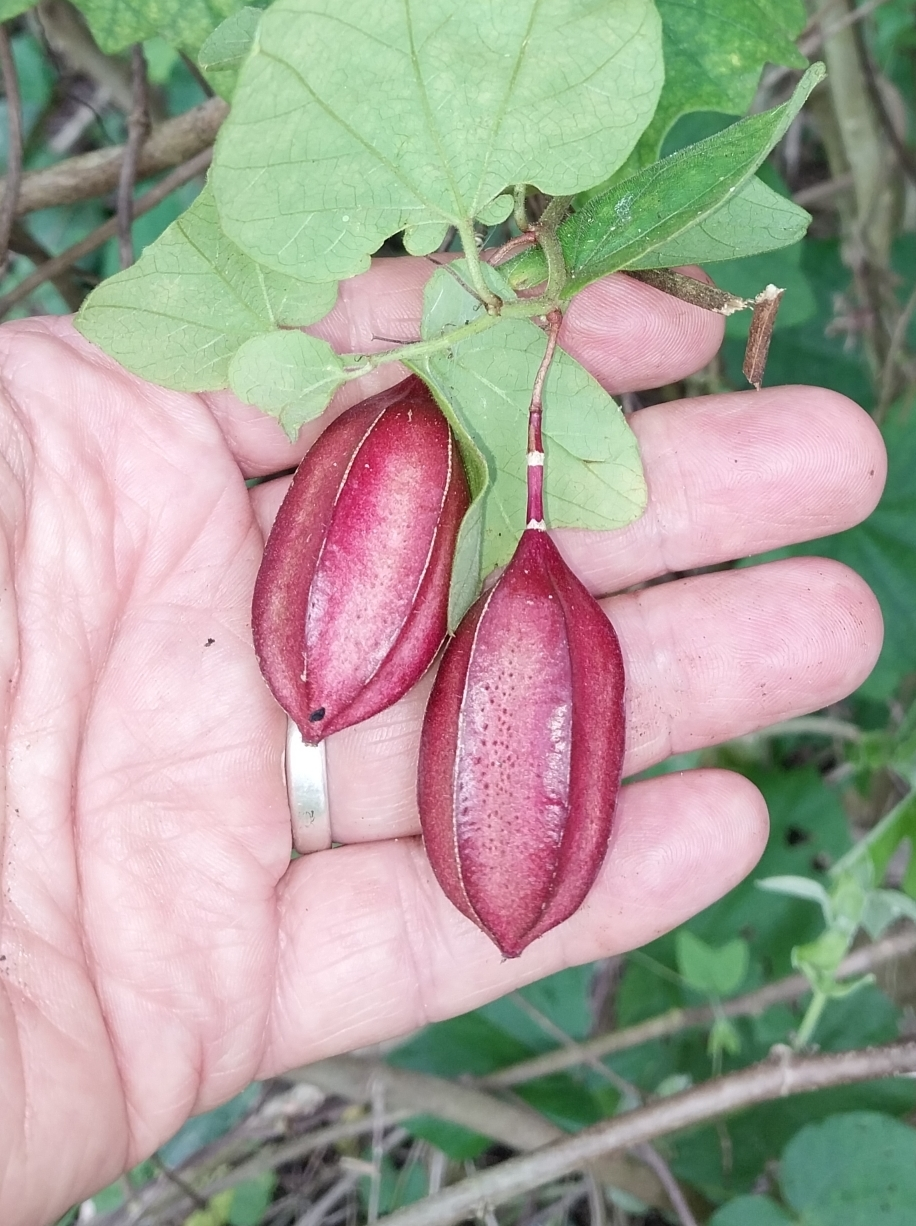
Cook Islands

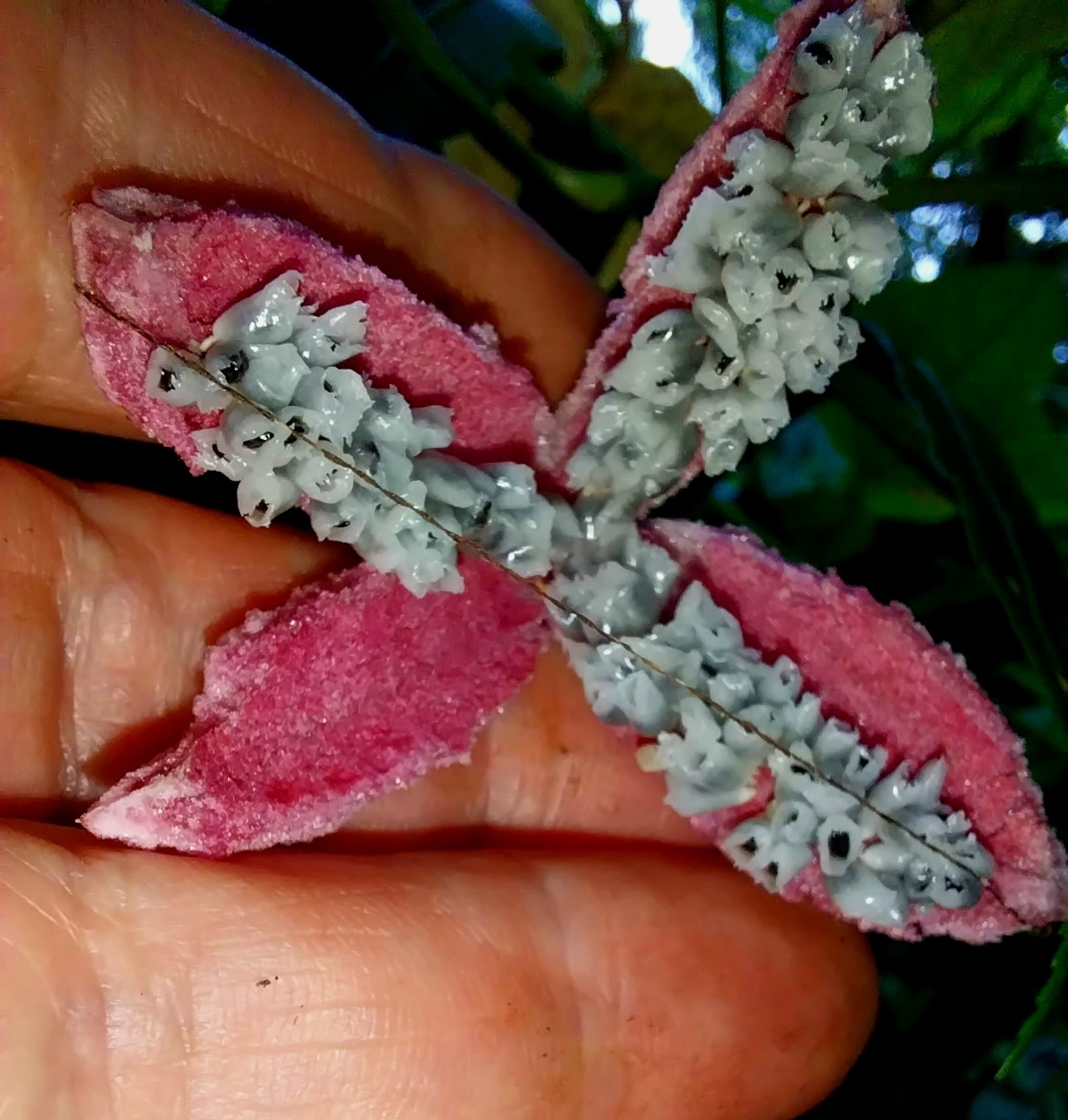
Cook Islands

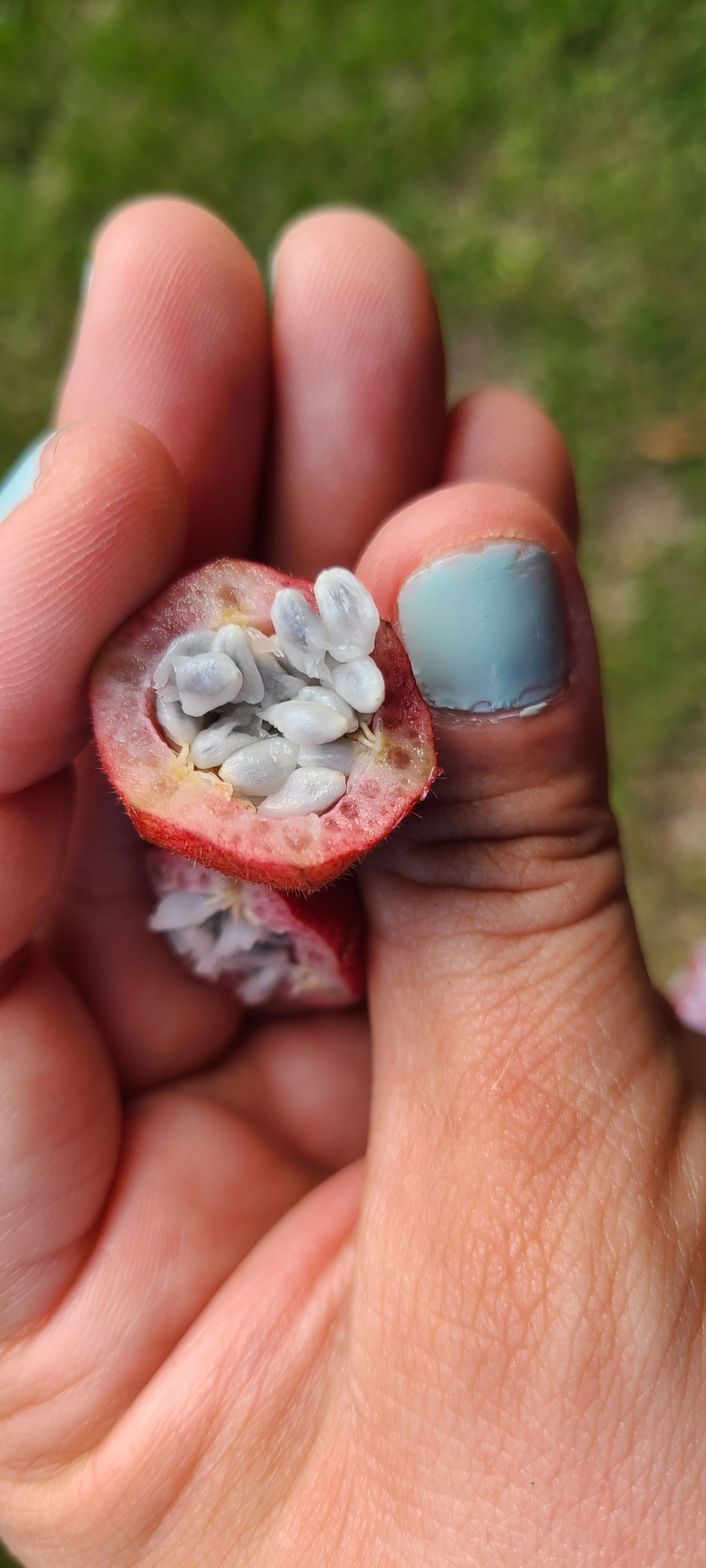
Puerto Rico

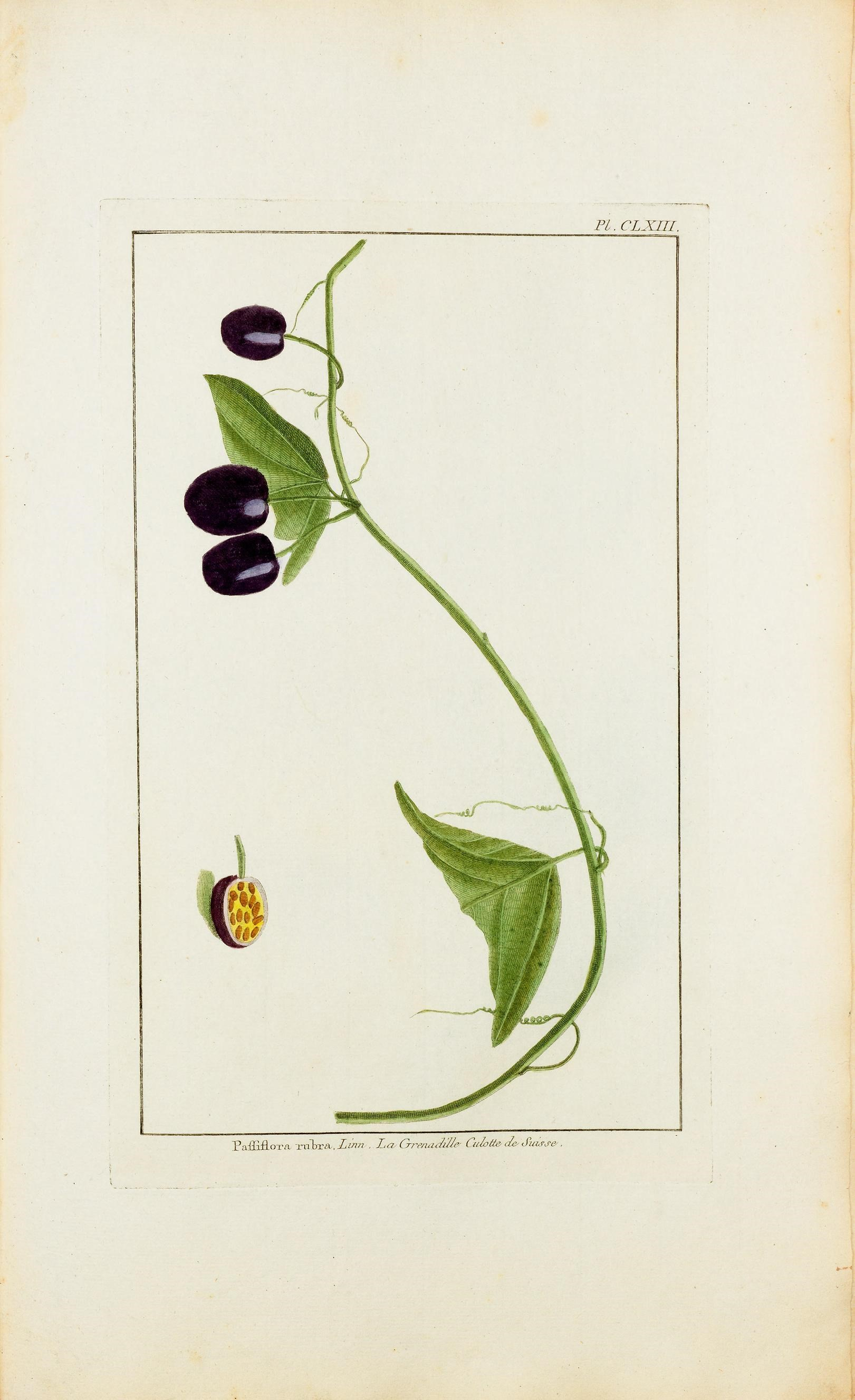
Illustration of fruit and leaves
