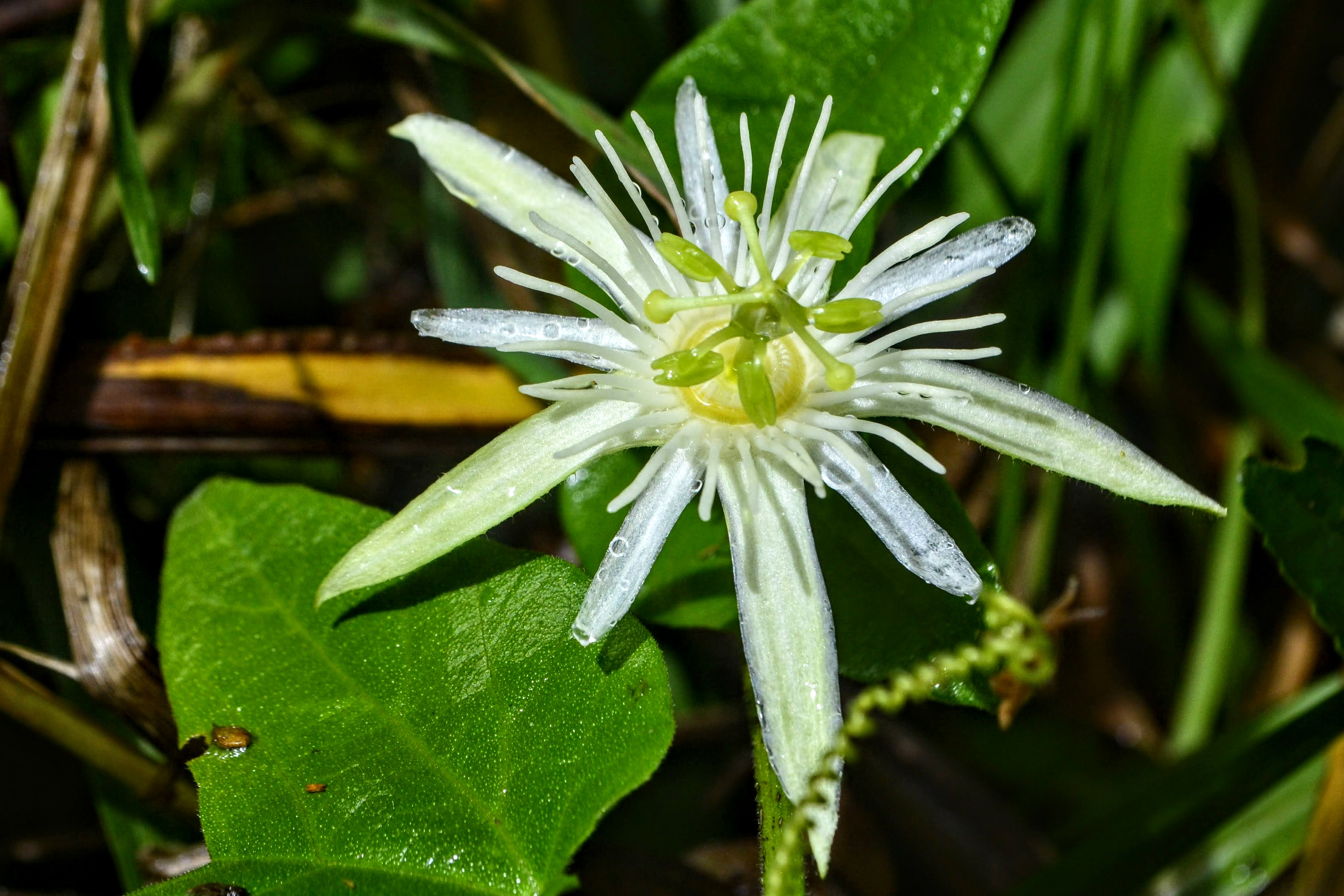
- P. capsularis flower
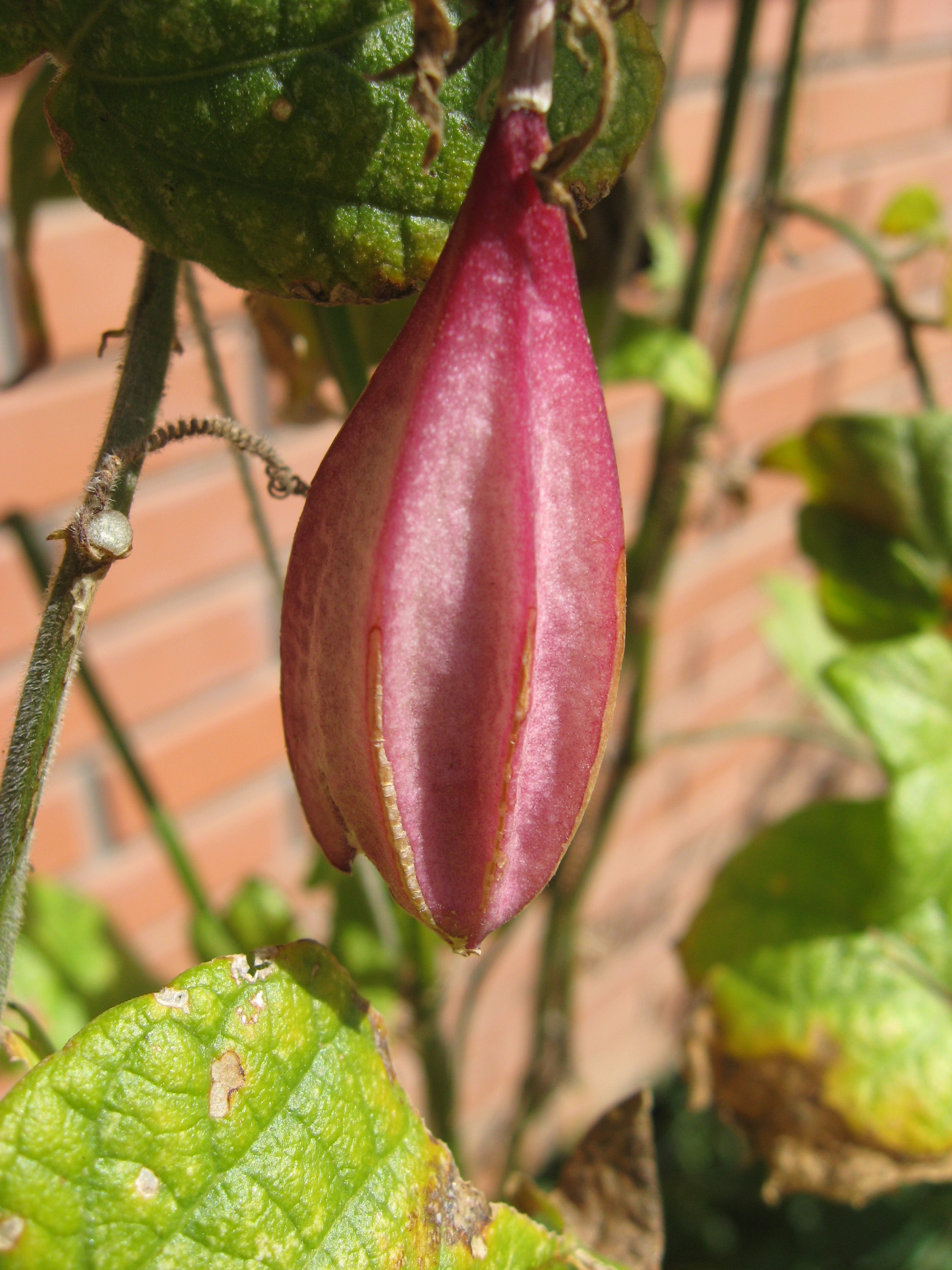
- P. capsularis fruit

Scientific classification
- Kingdom: Plantae
- Clade: Tracheophytes
- Clade: Angiosperms
- Clade: Eudicots
- Clade: Rosids
- Order: Malpighiales
- Family: Passifloraceae
- Genus: Passiflora
- Species: P. capsularis

Binomial name
- Passiflora capsularis L.

= Passiflora capsularis =

Red granadilla

Species of vine

Passiflora capsularis is a member of the family Passifloraceae with vanilla scented, delicate white flowers around 5 centimetres (2.0 in) long. It produces unusual looking ribbed ellipsoid fruits reddish purple in color, which are not edible. It grows readily in tropical climates, tolerating down to 5 °C and even lower for short spells. It flowers and grows readily even in small pots.
