= Hoterodes =

Scientific classification
- Kingdom: Animalia
- Phylum: Arthropoda
- Class: Insecta
- Order: Lepidoptera
- Family: Crambidae
- Subfamily: Spilomelinae
- Tribe: Margaroniini
- Genus: Hoterodes; Guenée, 1854

Genus of moths

Hoterodes is a genus of moths of the family Crambidae.

== Species ==
- Hoterodes albiceps (C. Felder, R. Felder & Rogenhofer, 1875)
- Hoterodes ausonia (Cramer, 1777)
- Hoterodes violescens (Dognin, 1903)

== Former species ==
- Hoterodes regalis Butler, 1882
- Hoterodes sericealis Pagenstecher, 1900
