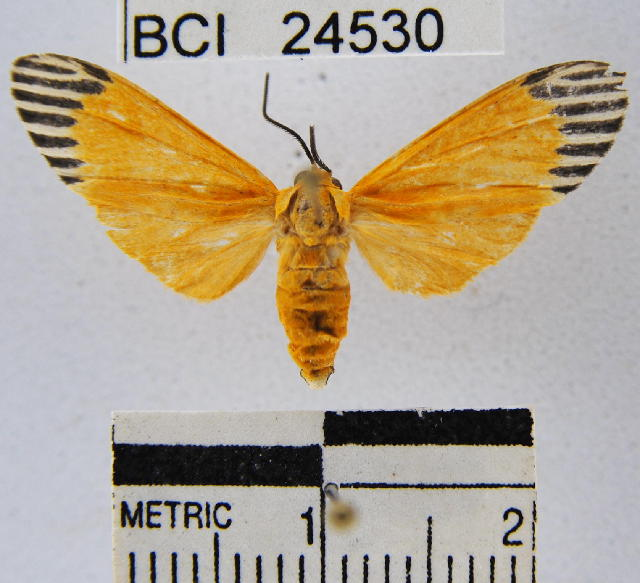

Scientific classification
- Kingdom: Animalia
- Phylum: Arthropoda
- Clade: Pancrustacea
- Class: Insecta
- Order: Lepidoptera
- Superfamily: Noctuoidea
- Family: Erebidae
- Subfamily: Arctiinae
- Genus: Uranophora
- Species: U. walkeri

Binomial name
- Uranophora walkeri (H. Druce, 1889)

Synonyms
- Evius walkeri H. Druce, 1889; Napata walkeri

= Uranophora walkeri =

Species of moth

Uranophora walkeri is a moth in the subfamily Arctiinae. It was described by Herbert Druce in 1889. It is found from Costa Rica and Panama to Peru.

It belongs to a mimicry complex that includes species in many other lepidopteran families, including Phostria mapetalis (Crambidae), Mapeta xanthomelas (Pyralidae), Pseudomennis bipennis (Geometridae), Mesene margaretta (Riodinidae), Oricia homalochroa (Notodontidae), and Pyromorpha synecha (Zygaenidae).
