= Uranophora munda =

Scientific classification
- Kingdom: Animalia
- Phylum: Arthropoda
- Class: Insecta
- Order: Lepidoptera
- Superfamily: Noctuoidea
- Family: Erebidae
- Subfamily: Arctiinae
- Genus: Uranophora
- Species: U. munda

Binomial name
- Uranophora munda (Walker, 1856)

Synonyms
- Ardonea munda Walker, 1856

Species of moth

Uranophora munda is a moth in the subfamily Arctiinae. It was described by Francis Walker in 1856. It is found on Haiti.
