= Oricia hillmani =

Scientific classification
- Kingdom: Animalia
- Phylum: Arthropoda
- Clade: Pancrustacea
- Class: Insecta
- Order: Lepidoptera
- Superfamily: Noctuoidea
- Family: Notodontidae
- Genus: Oricia
- Species: O. hillmani

Binomial name
- Oricia hillmani Miller, 2008

Species of moth

Oricia hillmani is a moth of the family Notodontidae first described by James S. Miller in 2008. It is found along the western slope of the Ecuadorian Andes at elevations ranging between 250 and 900 meters.

The length of the forewings is 17–19 mm for males and 19 mm for females.
