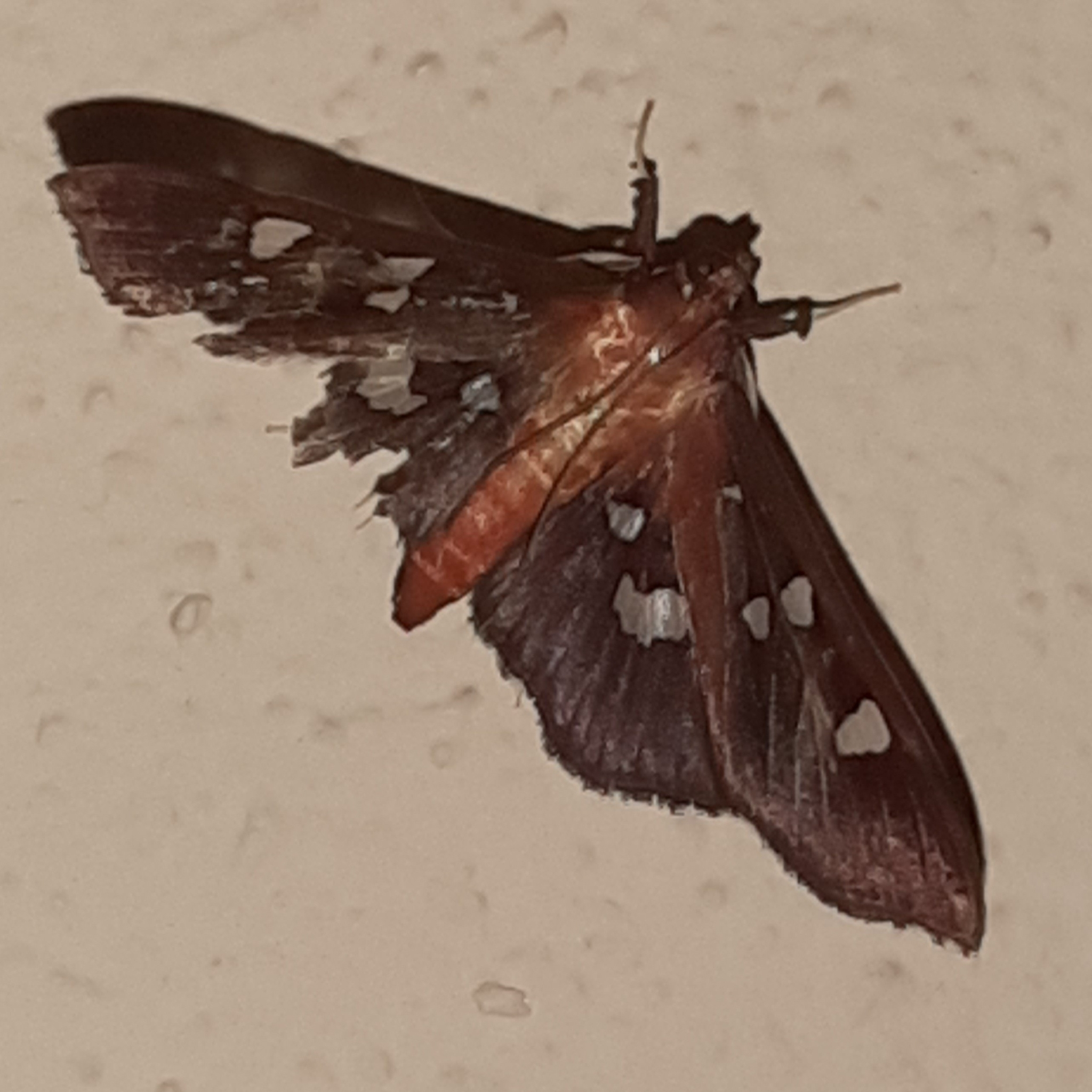

Scientific classification
- Kingdom: Animalia
- Phylum: Arthropoda
- Clade: Pancrustacea
- Class: Insecta
- Order: Lepidoptera
- Family: Crambidae
- Genus: Phostria
- Species: P. tedea

Binomial name
- Phostria tedea (Stoll in Cramer & Stoll, 1780)

Synonyms
- Phalaena Pyralis tedea Stoll in Cramer & Stoll, 1780

= Phostria tedea =

Species of moth

Phostria tedea is a species of moth in the family Crambidae. It was described by Stoll in 1780. It is found in the southern United States, where it has been recorded from Arizona, to Central America, including Mexico, Costa Rica and Belize.

The wingspan is about 33 mm. Adults have been recorded on wing in August and September.
