= Phostria alberici =

Scientific classification
- Kingdom: Animalia
- Phylum: Arthropoda
- Clade: Pancrustacea
- Class: Insecta
- Order: Lepidoptera
- Family: Crambidae
- Genus: Phostria
- Species: P. alberici

Binomial name
- Phostria alberici (Dufrane, 1945)

Synonyms
- Phryganodes alberici Dufrane, 1945

Species of moth

Phostria alberici is a species of moth in the family Crambidae. It was described by Abel Dufrane in 1945. It is found in the Democratic Republic of the Congo.
