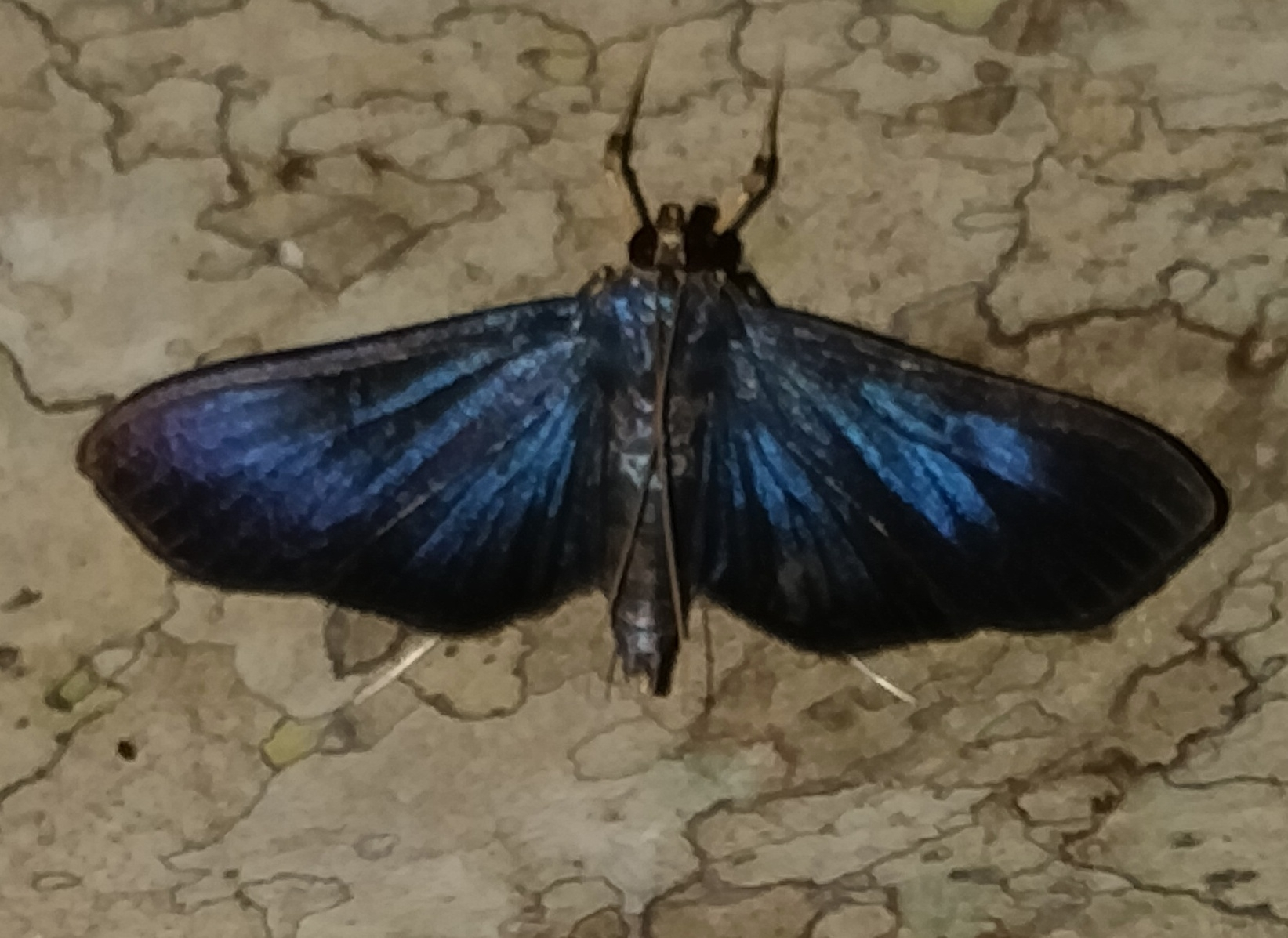

Scientific classification
- Kingdom: Animalia
- Phylum: Arthropoda
- Clade: Pancrustacea
- Class: Insecta
- Order: Lepidoptera
- Family: Crambidae
- Genus: Phostria
- Species: P. metalobalis

Binomial name
- Phostria metalobalis (Hampson, 1912)

Synonyms
- Phryganodes metalobalis Hampson, 1912

= Phostria metalobalis =

Species of moth

Phostria metalobalis is a species of moth in the family Crambidae. It was described by George Hampson in 1912. It is found in Guyana and Costa Rica.
