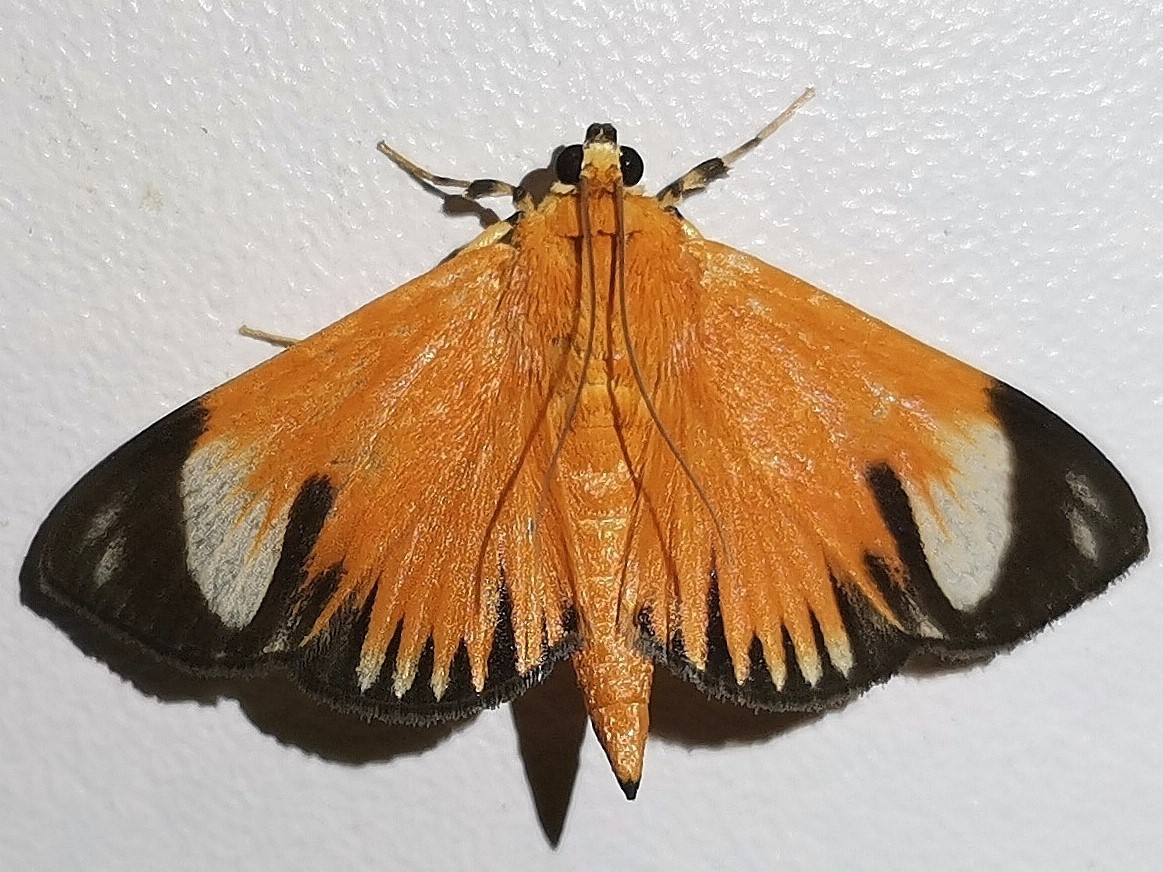

Scientific classification
- Kingdom: Animalia
- Phylum: Arthropoda
- Clade: Pancrustacea
- Class: Insecta
- Order: Lepidoptera
- Family: Crambidae
- Genus: Phostria
- Species: P. lithosialis

Binomial name
- Phostria lithosialis (Guenée, 1854)

Synonyms
- Botys lithosialis Guenée, 1854; Phakellura tiricialis Dognin, 1897; Phryganodes perfulvalis Hampson, 1899

= Phostria lithosialis =

Species of moth

Phostria lithosialis is a species of moth in the family Crambidae. It was described by Achille Guenée in 1854. It is found in Brazil, Ecuador and Peru.
