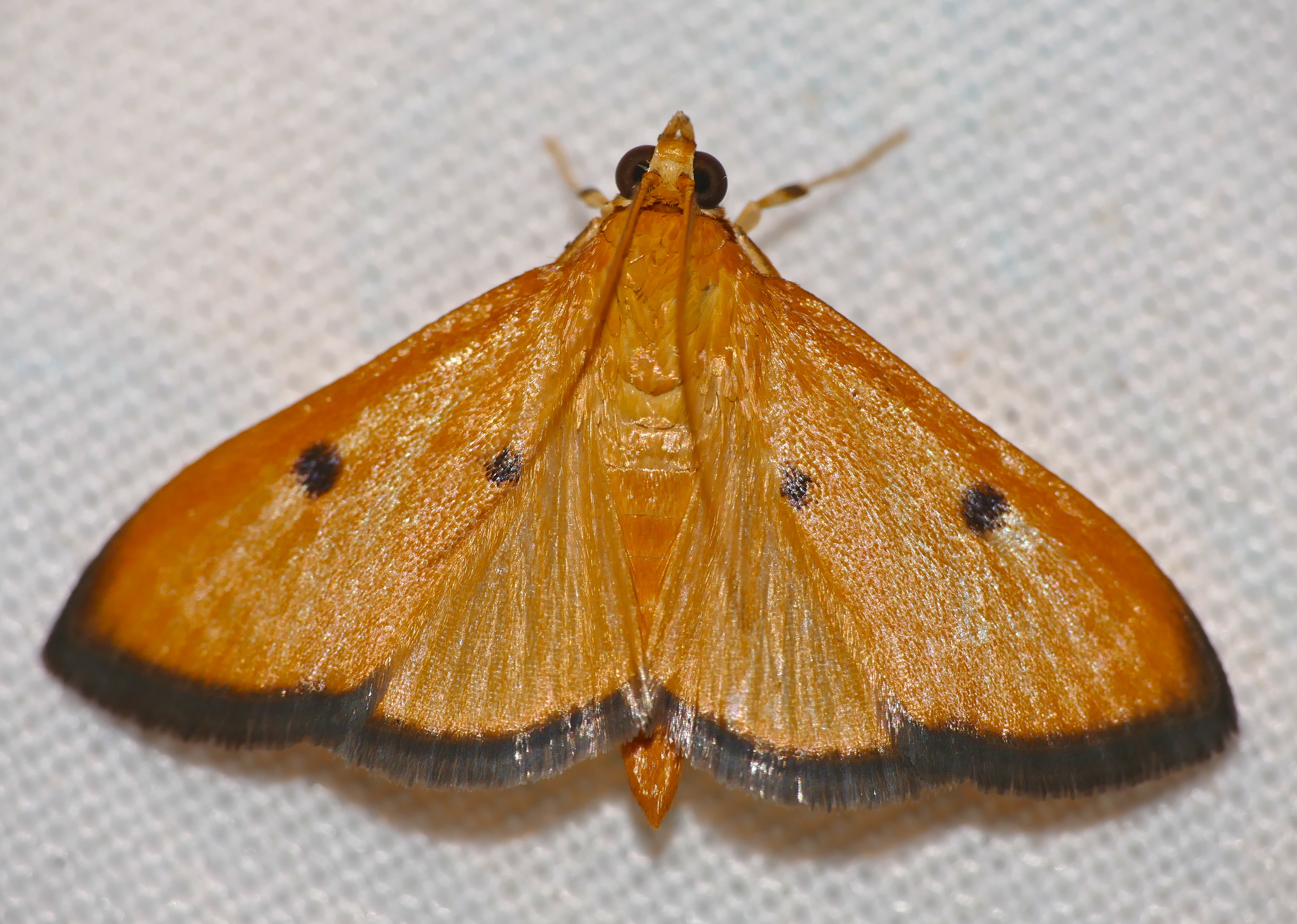

Scientific classification
- Kingdom: Animalia
- Phylum: Arthropoda
- Clade: Pancrustacea
- Class: Insecta
- Order: Lepidoptera
- Family: Crambidae
- Genus: Phostria
- Species: P. bistigmalis

Binomial name
- Phostria bistigmalis (Strand, 1913)

Synonyms
- Phryganodes bistigmalis Strand, 1913; Pyrausta atricinctalis Hampson, 1913

= Phostria bistigmalis =

Species of moth

Phostria bistigmalis is a species of moth in the family Crambidae. It was described by Embrik Strand in 1913. It is found in Tanzania and Zimbabwe.
