= Phostria stygichroa =

Scientific classification
- Kingdom: Animalia
- Phylum: Arthropoda
- Clade: Pancrustacea
- Class: Insecta
- Order: Lepidoptera
- Family: Crambidae
- Genus: Phostria
- Species: P. stygichroa

Binomial name
- Phostria stygichroa (Bethune-Baker, 1909)

Synonyms
- Phryganodes stygichroa Bethune-Baker, 1909

Species of moth

Phostria stygichroa is a species of moth in the family Crambidae. It was described by George Thomas Bethune-Baker in 1909. It is found in the Democratic Republic of the Congo (Orientale).
