= Uranophora jynx =

Scientific classification
- Domain: Eukaryota
- Kingdom: Animalia
- Phylum: Arthropoda
- Class: Insecta
- Order: Lepidoptera
- Superfamily: Noctuoidea
- Family: Erebidae
- Subfamily: Arctiinae
- Genus: Uranophora
- Species: U. jynx

Binomial name
- Uranophora jynx (Geyer, 1832)

Synonyms
- Calosoma jynx Geyer, 1832

Species of moth

Uranophora jynx is a moth in the subfamily Arctiinae. It was described by Carl Geyer in 1832. It is found in Paraná, Brazil.
