= Phostria albirenalis =

Scientific classification
- Kingdom: Animalia
- Phylum: Arthropoda
- Clade: Pancrustacea
- Class: Insecta
- Order: Lepidoptera
- Family: Crambidae
- Genus: Phostria
- Species: P. albirenalis

Binomial name
- Phostria albirenalis (Hampson, 1899)

Synonyms
- Phryganodes albirenalis Hampson, 1899

Species of moth

Phostria albirenalis is a species of moth in the family Crambidae. It was described by George Hampson in 1899. It is found in Pará, Brazil.
