= Phostria purpureonitens =

Scientific classification
- Kingdom: Animalia
- Phylum: Arthropoda
- Clade: Pancrustacea
- Class: Insecta
- Order: Lepidoptera
- Family: Crambidae
- Genus: Phostria
- Species: P. purpureonitens

Binomial name
- Phostria purpureonitens Hampson, 1918

Species of moth

Phostria purpureonitens is a species of moth in the family Crambidae. It was described by George Hampson in 1918. It is found on Woodlark Island in Papua New Guinea.

== Description ==
The wingspan is about 40 mm. The forewings are grey brown, glossed with brilliant purple except on the basal and costal areas. The hindwings are grey brown glossed with brilliant purple except at the base and on the inner area.
