= Uranophora iridis =

Scientific classification
- Kingdom: Animalia
- Phylum: Arthropoda
- Class: Insecta
- Order: Lepidoptera
- Superfamily: Noctuoidea
- Family: Erebidae
- Subfamily: Arctiinae
- Genus: Uranophora
- Species: U. iridis

Binomial name
- Uranophora iridis (Hampson, 1898)

Synonyms
- Napata iridis Hampson, 1898

Species of moth

Uranophora iridis is a moth in the subfamily Arctiinae. It was described by George Hampson in 1898. It is found in Bolivia.
