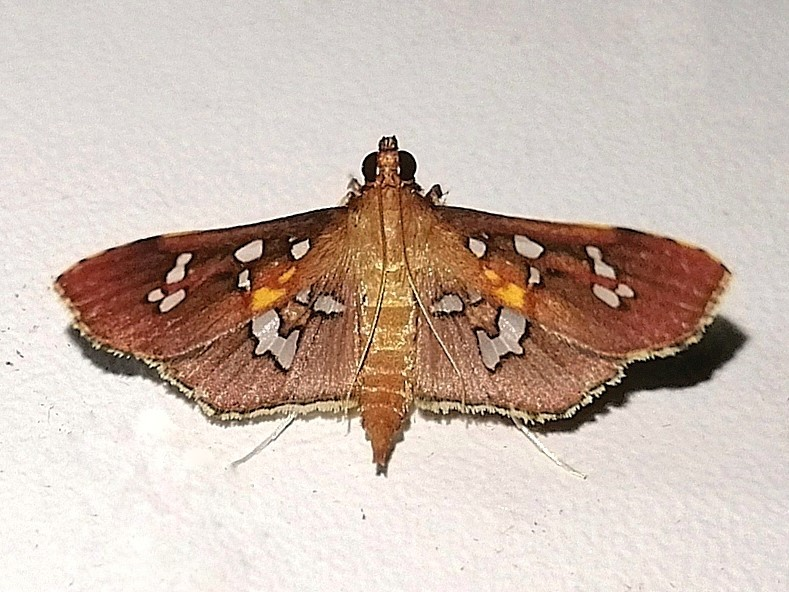

Scientific classification
- Kingdom: Animalia
- Phylum: Arthropoda
- Clade: Pancrustacea
- Class: Insecta
- Order: Lepidoptera
- Family: Crambidae
- Genus: Phostria
- Species: P. varialis

Binomial name
- Phostria varialis (Walker, 1862)

Synonyms
- Salbia varialis Walker, 1862

= Phostria varialis =

Species of moth

Phostria varialis is a species of moth in the family Crambidae. It is found in Brazil (Amazon region) and Costa Rica.
