= Phostria internervalis =

Scientific classification
- Kingdom: Animalia
- Phylum: Arthropoda
- Clade: Pancrustacea
- Class: Insecta
- Order: Lepidoptera
- Family: Crambidae
- Genus: Phostria
- Species: P. internervalis

Binomial name
- Phostria internervalis Hampson, 1918

Species of moth

Phostria internervalis is a species of moth in the family Crambidae. It was described by George Hampson in 1918. It is found in Colombia.

== Description ==
The wingspan is about 44 mm. The forewings are dark brown tinged with purple. There is a slight white streak below the basal half of the costa and a wedge-shaped white patch in the end of the cell, as well as a broad white fascia in the submedian fold from near the base to near the termen. The hindwings are white, but the costa is rather narrowly dark brown tinged with purple towards the apex and termen.
