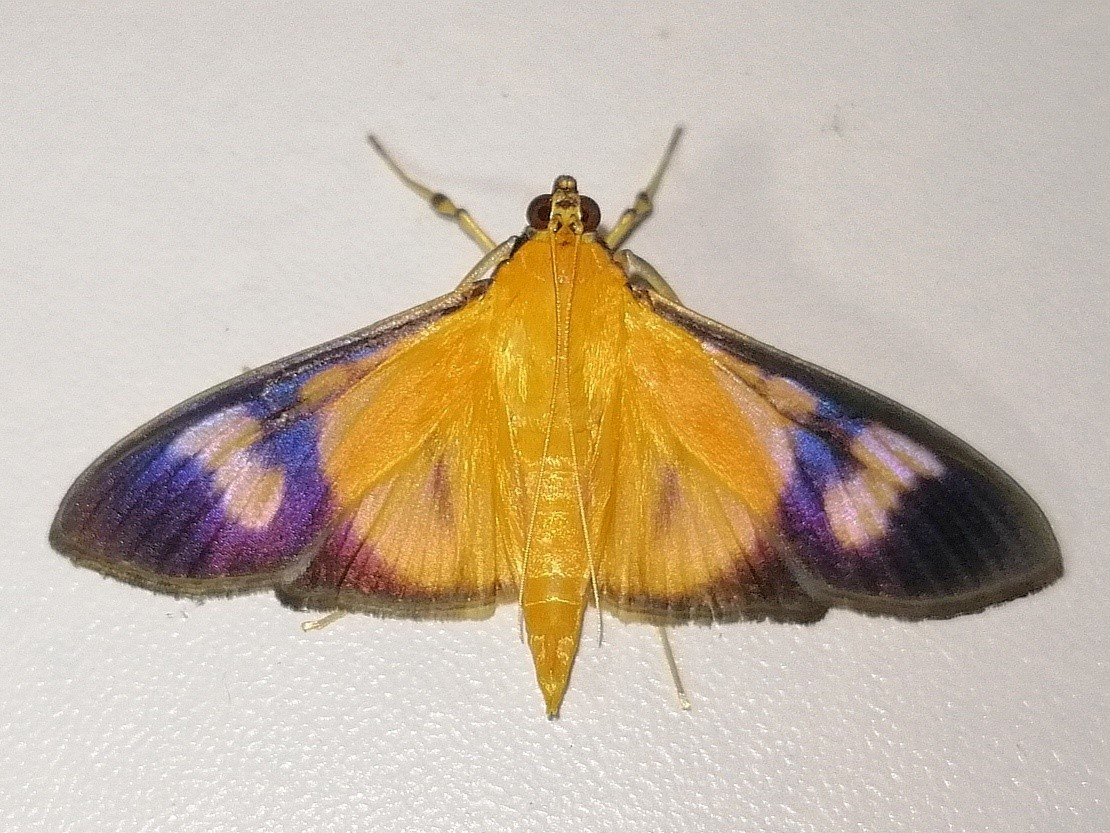

Scientific classification
- Kingdom: Animalia
- Phylum: Arthropoda
- Clade: Pancrustacea
- Class: Insecta
- Order: Lepidoptera
- Family: Crambidae
- Genus: Phostria
- Species: P. dohrnii

Binomial name
- Phostria dohrnii (Snellen, 1881)

Synonyms
- Plectroctena dohrnii Snellen, 1881; Plectroctena dohrni Snellen, 1895; Omiodes milvalis Druce, 1895

= Phostria dohrnii =

Species of moth

Phostria dohrnii is a species of moth in the family Crambidae. It was described by Snellen in 1881. It is found in Colombia, Costa Rica and Panama.

== Description ==
The fore- and hindwings are yellow, the former with the costal margin brownish-yellow and the apex broadly purplish-brown, as well as two lines crossing the wing from the costal to the inner margin and a small brown dot in the cell. The apex and outer margin of the hindwings are purplish-brown and there is a large U-shaped brown mark extending from the costal margin across the wing from near the lower side of which a waved line extends to the inner margin.
