= Phostria ledereralis =

Scientific classification
- Kingdom: Animalia
- Phylum: Arthropoda
- Clade: Pancrustacea
- Class: Insecta
- Order: Lepidoptera
- Family: Crambidae
- Genus: Phostria
- Species: P. ledereralis

Binomial name
- Phostria ledereralis (Strand, 1920)

Synonyms
- Pycnarmon ledereralis Strand, 1920

Species of moth

Phostria ledereralis is a species of moth in the family Crambidae. It was described by Strand in 1920. It is found in Sierra Leone.
