= Hoterodes violescens =

Scientific classification
- Kingdom: Animalia
- Phylum: Arthropoda
- Class: Insecta
- Order: Lepidoptera
- Family: Crambidae
- Genus: Hoterodes
- Species: H. violescens

Binomial name
- Hoterodes violescens (Dognin, 1903)

Synonyms
- Glyphodes violescens Dognin, 1903; Margaronia sphendonetis Meyrick, 1936

Species of moth

Hoterodes violescens is a moth in the family Crambidae. It was described by Paul Dognin in 1903. It is found in Bolivia and Peru.
