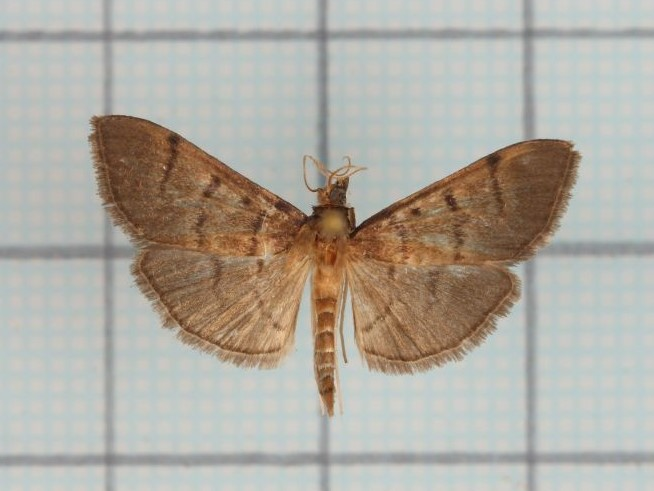
- Phostria obscurata

Scientific classification
- Kingdom: Animalia
- Phylum: Arthropoda
- Class: Insecta
- Order: Lepidoptera
- Family: Crambidae
- Tribe: Agroterini
- Genus: Phostria; Hübner, 1819

Synonyms
- Antennodes Swinhoe, 1906; Condega Moore, 1886; Hoplisa Snellen, 1899; Oedematarcha Swinhoe, 1900; Parbokla Swinhoe, 1900; Plectrona Snellen, 1895; Plectroctena Snellen, 1881; Saroscelis Meyrick, 1894; Vatica Walker, 1869

= Phostria =

Genus of moths

Phostria is a genus of moths of the family Crambidae.

== Species ==
- Phostria aengusalis Schaus, 1927
- Phostria alberici (Dufrane, 1945)
- Phostria albescentalis Hampson, 1918
- Phostria albirenalis (Hampson, 1899)
- Phostria aterrimalis Hampson, 1918
- Phostria atrisignalis (Hampson, 1912)
- Phostria bistigmalis (Strand, 1913)
- Phostria buckleyi (Druce, 1902)
- Phostria calydon Druce, 1885
- Phostria caniusalis (Walker, 1859)
- Phostria celsusalis Schaus, 1927
- Phostria chrysomera Hampson, 1918
- Phostria citrinalis (Druce, 1895)
- Phostria clementalis (Schaus, 1912)
- Phostria cleodalis Schaus, 1920
- Phostria concolor (C. Felder, R. Felder & Rogenhofer, 1875)
- Phostria crithonalis (Walker, 1859)
- Phostria delilalis (Walker, 1859)
- Phostria diffusimarginalis (Hampson, 1899)
- Phostria discipunctalis (Hampson, 1903)
- Phostria dispila Ghesquière, 1940
- Phostria dohrnii (Snellen, 1881)
- Phostria druonalis Schaus, 1927
- Phostria earlalis (Swinhoe, 1906)
- Phostria euagra (C. Felder, R. Felder & Rogenhofer, 1875)
- Phostria euryleucalis Hampson, 1918
- Phostria flavipectus (Bethune-Baker, 1909)
- Phostria fumarialis (Dewitz, 1881)
- Phostria glyphodoides (Hampson, 1912)
- Phostria gravitalis (Saalmüller, 1880)
- Phostria hampsonialis Schaus, 1920
- Phostria hesusalis (Walker, 1859)
- Phostria indignalis Schaus, 1920
- Phostria internervalis Hampson, 1918
- Phostria jansei West, 1931
- Phostria latiapicalis (Schaus, 1912)
- Phostria ledereralis (Strand, 1920)
- Phostria leucophasma (Dyar, 1912)
- Phostria linealis (Guenée, 1854)
- Phostria lithosialis (Guenée, 1854)
- Phostria luridalis Ghesquière, 1942
- Phostria luridombrina Ghesquière, 1942
- Phostria maculicostalis Hampson, 1893
- Phostria mapetalis (Schaus, 1912)
- Phostria marginalis Amsel, 1956
- Phostria mediospilota Ghesquière, 1942
- Phostria melanophthalma Meyrick, 1933
- Phostria memmialoides Amsel, 1956
- Phostria mendelalis (Druce, 1902)
- Phostria metalobalis (Hampson, 1912)
- Phostria microselene (Hampson, 1918)
- Phostria monotona Amsel, 1956
- Phostria mungalis (Plötz, 1880)
- Phostria nicoalis (Walker, 1859)
- Phostria oajacalis (Walker, 1866)
- Phostria obliqualis (Schaus, 1912)
- Phostria obscurata (Moore, 1885)
- Phostria ocellalis (Aurivillius, 1925)
- Phostria orientalis (Snellen, 1901)
- Phostria persiusalis (Walker, 1859)
- Phostria phaennisalis (Walker, 1859)
- Phostria phryganurus (C. Felder, R. Felder & Rogenhofer, 1875)
- Phostria primulosalis Schaus, 1927
- Phostria purpuralis (Druce, 1895)
- Phostria purpureonitens Hampson, 1918
- Phostria quadriguttata (Walker, 1869)
- Phostria radicalis (Walker, 1866)
- Phostria regalis (Butler, 1882)
- Phostria rufalis (Schaus, 1912)
- Phostria rutilalis (Walker, 1869)
- Phostria samealis (Hampson, 1912)
- Phostria schediusalis (Walker, 1859)
- Phostria sericealis (Pagenstecher, 1900)
- Phostria sexguttata (Holland, 1920)
- Phostria soricalis (Snellen, 1899)
- Phostria stygichroa (Bethune-Baker, 1909)
- Phostria syleptalis (Strand, 1918)
- Phostria tamsina Ghesquière, 1942
- Phostria tedea (Stoll in Cramer & Stoll, 1780)
- Phostria temira (Stoll in Cramer & Stoll, 1781)
- Phostria tetrastictalis (Hampson, 1912)
- Phostria tridentalis (Hampson, 1912)
- Phostria truncatalis (Hampson, 1912)
- Phostria umbrina Ghesquière, 1942
- Phostria varialis (Walker, 1862)
- Phostria vitrifera (Dognin, 1911)
- Phostria xanthoproctalis Hampson, 1918
- Phostria xipharesalis (Walker, 1859)

== Former species ==
- Phostria harutai Inoue, 1955
