= Phostria umbrina =

Scientific classification
- Kingdom: Animalia
- Phylum: Arthropoda
- Clade: Pancrustacea
- Class: Insecta
- Order: Lepidoptera
- Family: Crambidae
- Genus: Phostria
- Species: P. umbrina

Binomial name
- Phostria umbrina Ghesquière, 1942

Species of moth

Phostria umbrina is a species of moth in the family Crambidae. It was described by Jean Ghesquière in 1942. It is found in the former provinces of Équateur, Orientale and Kasai-Oriental in the Democratic Republic of the Congo.
