= Phostria radicalis =

Scientific classification
- Kingdom: Animalia
- Phylum: Arthropoda
- Clade: Pancrustacea
- Class: Insecta
- Order: Lepidoptera
- Family: Crambidae
- Genus: Phostria
- Species: P. radicalis

Binomial name
- Phostria radicalis (Walker, 1866)

Synonyms
- Botys radicalis Walker, 1866

Species of moth

Phostria radicalis is a species of moth in the family Crambidae. It was described by Francis Walker in 1866. It is found in New Guinea and Seram in Indonesia.
