= Phostria caniusalis =

Scientific classification
- Kingdom: Animalia
- Phylum: Arthropoda
- Clade: Pancrustacea
- Class: Insecta
- Order: Lepidoptera
- Family: Crambidae
- Genus: Phostria
- Species: P. caniusalis

Binomial name
- Phostria caniusalis (Walker, 1859)

Synonyms
- Botys caniusalis Walker, 1859

Species of moth

Phostria caniusalis is a species of moth in the family Crambidae. It was described by Francis Walker in 1859. It is found in Sierra Leone.
