= Phostria aengusalis =

Scientific classification
- Kingdom: Animalia
- Phylum: Arthropoda
- Clade: Pancrustacea
- Class: Insecta
- Order: Lepidoptera
- Family: Crambidae
- Genus: Phostria
- Species: P. aengusalis

Binomial name
- Phostria aengusalis Schaus, 1927

Species of moth

Phostria aengusalis is a species of moth in the family Crambidae. It was described by Schaus in 1927. It is found in the Philippines (Luzon).
