= Phostria chrysomera =

Scientific classification
- Kingdom: Animalia
- Phylum: Arthropoda
- Clade: Pancrustacea
- Class: Insecta
- Order: Lepidoptera
- Family: Crambidae
- Genus: Phostria
- Species: P. chrysomera

Binomial name
- Phostria chrysomera Hampson, 1918

Species of moth

Phostria chrysomera is a species of moth in the family Crambidae. It was described by George Hampson in 1918. It is found in Peru.

== Description ==
The wingspan is about 40 mm. The forewings are dark brown glossed with brilliant purple. There is a wedge-shaped golden-yellow patch in the cell from the base to near the extremity, as well as a broad oblique golden-yellow postmedial band from just below the costa to the submedian fold near the termen, and a golden-yellow streak on the inner margin from the base to beyond the middle. The hindwings are golden yellow, the inner area from near the base and the terminal area dark brown glossed with brilliant purple, the extremity of the yellow area rounded so that the dark area expands widely towards the costa and tornus.
