= Phostria leucophasma =

Scientific classification
- Kingdom: Animalia
- Phylum: Arthropoda
- Clade: Pancrustacea
- Class: Insecta
- Order: Lepidoptera
- Family: Crambidae
- Genus: Phostria
- Species: P. leucophasma

Binomial name
- Phostria leucophasma (Dyar, 1912)

Synonyms
- Phryganodes leucophasma Dyar, 1912; Pilocrocis leucochasma Strand, 1922; Pilocrocis huancabambae Strand, 1922

Species of moth

Phostria leucophasma is a species of moth in the family Crambidae. It was described by Harrison Gray Dyar Jr. in 1912. It is found in Mexico and Peru.

== Description ==
The moth has a wingspan of about 30 mm. The wings are tan brown, with white subhyaline spaces. There is a speck near the base of the cell and a larger one below, as well as a round spot in the end of the cell, a pyriform (pear-shaped) one below it from which extend five spots to the costa, the three below small and dislocated by a blackish cloud, the two upper larger, quadrate and fused. The hindwings have two spots touching at their angles, the one on the inner margin running into the cell, the discal one further out and running up toward the costa.
