= Phostria syleptalis =

Scientific classification
- Kingdom: Animalia
- Phylum: Arthropoda
- Clade: Pancrustacea
- Class: Insecta
- Order: Lepidoptera
- Family: Crambidae
- Genus: Phostria
- Species: P. syleptalis

Binomial name
- Phostria syleptalis (Strand, 1918)

Synonyms
- Lygropia syleptalis Strand, 1918

Species of moth

Phostria syleptalis is a species of moth in the family Crambidae. It was described by Strand in 1918. It is found in Taiwan.
