= Phostria xanthoproctalis =

Scientific classification
- Kingdom: Animalia
- Phylum: Arthropoda
- Clade: Pancrustacea
- Class: Insecta
- Order: Lepidoptera
- Family: Crambidae
- Genus: Phostria
- Species: P. xanthoproctalis

Binomial name
- Phostria xanthoproctalis Hampson, 1918

Species of moth

Phostria xanthoproctalis is a species of moth in the family Crambidae. It was described by George Hampson in 1918 and is found in Venezuela.

The wingspan is approximately 46 mm. The forewings are uniform glossy grey-brown tinged with purple. The hindwings are glossy grey-brown tinged with purple, with the inner area slightly paler.
