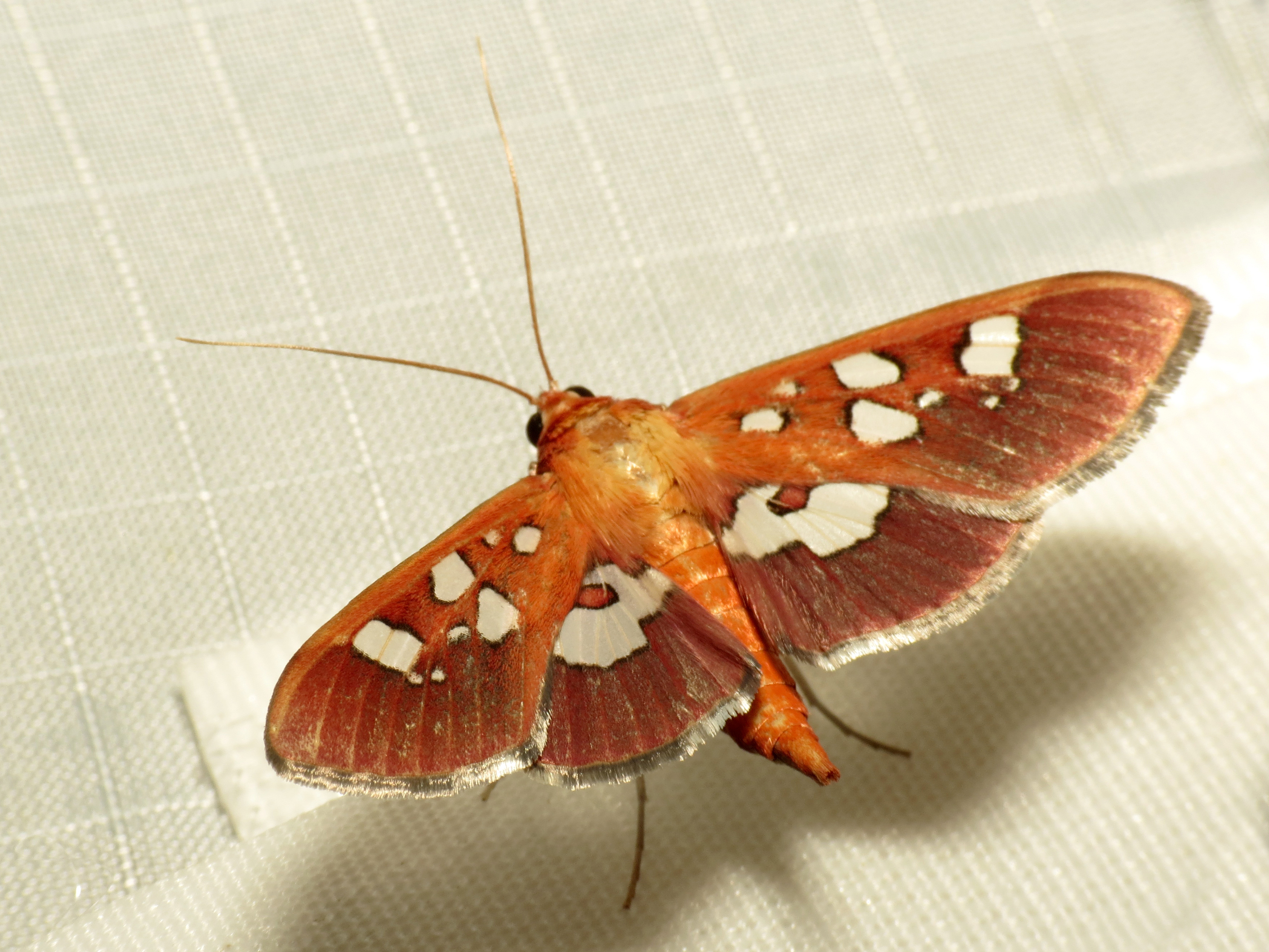

Scientific classification
- Kingdom: Animalia
- Phylum: Arthropoda
- Clade: Pancrustacea
- Class: Insecta
- Order: Lepidoptera
- Family: Crambidae
- Genus: Phostria
- Species: P. oajacalis

Binomial name
- Phostria oajacalis (Walker, 1866)

Synonyms
- Botys oajacalis Walker, 1866; Botys pelialis C. Felder, R. Felder & Rogenhofer, 1875

= Phostria oajacalis =

Species of moth

Phostria oajacalis is a species of moth in the family Crambidae. It was described by Francis Walker in 1866. It is found in Nicaragua, Guatemala, Costa Rica., Mexico, and southern United States.

Its males are often characterized by its white legs, cupreous-brown legs, white tarsi and posterior tibiae, long brown wings with aeneous and purple reflections, a large white semihyaline black-bordered patch in the disk, and whitish fringe.
