= Phostria euryleucalis =

Scientific classification
- Kingdom: Animalia
- Phylum: Arthropoda
- Clade: Pancrustacea
- Class: Insecta
- Order: Lepidoptera
- Family: Crambidae
- Genus: Phostria
- Species: P. euryleucalis

Binomial name
- Phostria euryleucalis Hampson, 1918

Species of moth

Phostria euryleucalis is a species of moth in the family Crambidae. It was described by George Hampson in 1918. It is found in Peru.

== Description ==
The wingspan is about 42 mm. The forewings are dark brown with a cupreous gloss and hyaline (glass-like) stripes in and below the cell, as well as a spot above the base of vein 2, which is slightly irrorated (speckled) with brown. There is a broad oblique white band from below the costa beyond the middle to above the tornus. The hindwings are hyaline, the veins streaked with dark brown. There is a rather narrow dark brown terminal band with a cupreous gloss, narrowing to a point at the tornus.
