= Phostria mendelalis =

Scientific classification
- Kingdom: Animalia
- Phylum: Arthropoda
- Clade: Pancrustacea
- Class: Insecta
- Order: Lepidoptera
- Family: Crambidae
- Genus: Phostria
- Species: P. mendelalis

Binomial name
- Phostria mendelalis (H. Druce, 1902)

Synonyms
- Phryganodes mendelalis H. Druce, 1902

Species of moth

Phostria mendelalis is a species of moth in the family Crambidae. It was described by Herbert Druce in 1902. It is found in Ecuador.
