= Phostria mediospilota =

Scientific classification
- Kingdom: Animalia
- Phylum: Arthropoda
- Clade: Pancrustacea
- Class: Insecta
- Order: Lepidoptera
- Family: Crambidae
- Genus: Phostria
- Species: P. mediospilota

Binomial name
- Phostria mediospilota Ghesquière, 1942

Species of moth

Phostria mediospilota is a species of moth in the family Crambidae. It was described by Jean Ghesquière in 1942. It is found in the former province of Équateur in the Democratic Republic of the Congo.
