= Phostria ocellalis =

Scientific classification
- Kingdom: Animalia
- Phylum: Arthropoda
- Clade: Pancrustacea
- Class: Insecta
- Order: Lepidoptera
- Family: Crambidae
- Genus: Phostria
- Species: P. ocellalis

Binomial name
- Phostria ocellalis (Aurivillius, 1925)

Synonyms
- Phryganodes ocellalis Aurivillius, 1925

Species of moth

Phostria ocellalis is a species of moth in the family Crambidae. It was described by Per Olof Christopher Aurivillius in 1925. It is found in the Democratic Republic of the Congo.
