= Phostria albescentalis =

Scientific classification
- Kingdom: Animalia
- Phylum: Arthropoda
- Clade: Pancrustacea
- Class: Insecta
- Order: Lepidoptera
- Family: Crambidae
- Genus: Phostria
- Species: P. albescentalis

Binomial name
- Phostria albescentalis Hampson, 1918

Species of moth

Phostria albescentalis is a species of moth in the family Crambidae. It was described by George Hampson in 1918. It is found in the Democratic Republic of the Congo (North Kivu), Kenya and Mozambique.

== Description ==
The inner margin of the forewings has a small black spot at its extremity, and there is a curved blackish antemedial line, as well as a small black spot in the middle of the cell and an elliptical discoidal spot. The postmedial line is blackish, and there is a slight blackish terminal line. The basal half of the hindwings is white, and the terminal half is whitish, suffused with pale grey-brown. There is a small oblique black discoidal spot and a diffused dark postmedial line, as well as an indistinct, diffused, curved brown subterminal line and a black terminal line.
