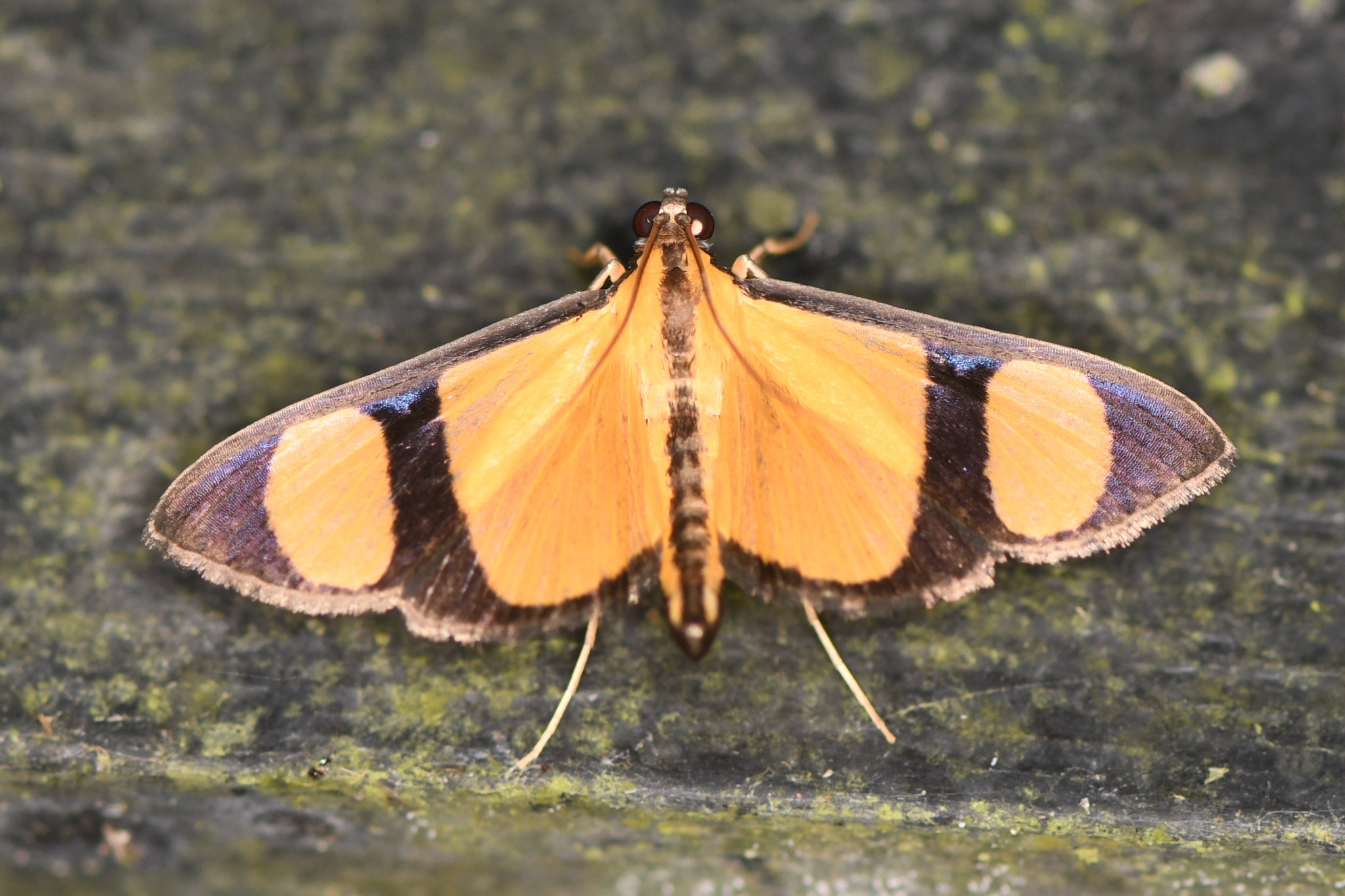

Scientific classification
- Kingdom: Animalia
- Phylum: Arthropoda
- Clade: Pancrustacea
- Class: Insecta
- Order: Lepidoptera
- Family: Crambidae
- Genus: Phostria
- Species: P. delilalis

Binomial name
- Phostria delilalis (Walker, 1859)

Synonyms
- Hyalea delilalis Walker, 1859; Botys atyrialis C. Felder, R. Felder & Rogenhofer, 1875

= Phostria delilalis =

Species of moth

Phostria delilalis is a species of moth in the family Crambidae. It was described by Francis Walker in 1859. It is found in Tefé, Brazil.
