= Phostria clementalis =

Scientific classification
- Kingdom: Animalia
- Phylum: Arthropoda
- Clade: Pancrustacea
- Class: Insecta
- Order: Lepidoptera
- Family: Crambidae
- Genus: Phostria
- Species: P. clementalis

Binomial name
- Phostria clementalis (Schaus, 1912)

Synonyms
- Phryganodes clementalis Schaus, 1912

Species of moth

Phostria clementalis is a species of moth in the family Crambidae. It was described by Schaus in 1912. It is found in Costa Rica.
