= Uranophora terminalis =

Scientific classification
- Kingdom: Animalia
- Phylum: Arthropoda
- Class: Insecta
- Order: Lepidoptera
- Superfamily: Noctuoidea
- Family: Erebidae
- Subfamily: Arctiinae
- Genus: Uranophora
- Species: U. terminalis

Binomial name
- Uranophora terminalis (Walker, 1854)

Synonyms
- Euchromia terminalis Walker, 1854

Species of moth

Uranophora terminalis is a moth in the subfamily Arctiinae. It was described by Francis Walker in 1854. It is found in Pernambuco, Brazil.
