= Oricia truncata =

Scientific classification
- Kingdom: Animalia
- Phylum: Arthropoda
- Clade: Pancrustacea
- Class: Insecta
- Order: Lepidoptera
- Superfamily: Noctuoidea
- Family: Notodontidae
- Genus: Oricia
- Species: O. truncata

Binomial name
- Oricia truncata Walker, 1854

Synonyms
- Oricia domina Schaus, 1912

Species of moth

Oricia truncata is a moth of the family Notodontidae. It is found from Mexico south to Panama.

The larvae feed on Rinorea squamata.
