= Uranophora broadwayi =

Scientific classification
- Domain: Eukaryota
- Kingdom: Animalia
- Phylum: Arthropoda
- Class: Insecta
- Order: Lepidoptera
- Superfamily: Noctuoidea
- Family: Erebidae
- Subfamily: Arctiinae
- Genus: Uranophora
- Species: U. broadwayi

Binomial name
- Uranophora broadwayi (Schaus, 1896)

Synonyms
- Syntomeida broadwayi Schaus, 1896

Species of moth

Uranophora broadwayi is a moth in the subfamily Arctiinae. It was described by William Schaus in 1896. It is found in Trinidad.
