= Oricia phryganeata =

Scientific classification
- Kingdom: Animalia
- Phylum: Arthropoda
- Clade: Pancrustacea
- Class: Insecta
- Order: Lepidoptera
- Superfamily: Noctuoidea
- Family: Notodontidae
- Genus: Oricia
- Species: O. phryganeata

Binomial name
- Oricia phryganeata (Warren, 1907)

Synonyms
- Stenoplastis phryganeata Warren, 1907

Species of moth

Oricia phryganeata is a moth of the family Notodontidae. It is found along the eastern slope of the Andes from northern Ecuador south to Bolivia, at elevations between 350 and 1,500 meters (1,150 and 4,920 ft).
