= Phostria calydon =

Scientific classification
- Kingdom: Animalia
- Phylum: Arthropoda
- Clade: Pancrustacea
- Class: Insecta
- Order: Lepidoptera
- Family: Crambidae
- Genus: Phostria
- Species: P. calydon

Binomial name
- Phostria calydon (H. Druce, 1885)

Synonyms
- Erbessa calydon H. Druce, 1885

Species of moth

Phostria calydon is a species of moth in the family Crambidae first described by Herbert Druce in 1885. It is found in Ecuador.
