= Phostria truncatalis =

Scientific classification
- Kingdom: Animalia
- Phylum: Arthropoda
- Clade: Pancrustacea
- Class: Insecta
- Order: Lepidoptera
- Family: Crambidae
- Genus: Phostria
- Species: P. truncatalis

Binomial name
- Phostria truncatalis (Hampson, 1912)

Synonyms
- Phryganodes truncatalis Hampson, 1912

Species of moth

Phostria truncatalis is a species of moth in the family Crambidae. It was described by George Hampson in 1912. It is found in Panama and Costa Rica.
