= Phostria orientalis =

Scientific classification
- Kingdom: Animalia
- Phylum: Arthropoda
- Clade: Pancrustacea
- Class: Insecta
- Order: Lepidoptera
- Family: Crambidae
- Genus: Phostria
- Species: P. orientalis

Binomial name
- Phostria orientalis (Snellen, 1901)

Synonyms
- Plectrona orientalis Snellen, 1901

Species of moth

Phostria orientalis is a species of moth in the family Crambidae. It was described by Snellen in 1901. It is found on Borneo.
