= Uranophora eucyane =

Scientific classification
- Domain: Eukaryota
- Kingdom: Animalia
- Phylum: Arthropoda
- Class: Insecta
- Order: Lepidoptera
- Superfamily: Noctuoidea
- Family: Erebidae
- Subfamily: Arctiinae
- Genus: Uranophora
- Species: U. eucyane

Binomial name
- Uranophora eucyane (Felder, 1874)

Synonyms
- Cyanopepla eucyane Felder, 1874; Belemniastis eucyane; Napata eucyane; Uranophora felderi Zerny, 1912

Species of moth

Uranophora eucyane is a moth of the subfamily Arctiinae. It was described by Cajetan Felder in 1874. It is found in Brazil.
