= Uranophora lena =

Scientific classification
- Domain: Eukaryota
- Kingdom: Animalia
- Phylum: Arthropoda
- Class: Insecta
- Order: Lepidoptera
- Superfamily: Noctuoidea
- Family: Erebidae
- Subfamily: Arctiinae
- Genus: Uranophora
- Species: U. lena

Binomial name
- Uranophora lena (Schaus, 1892)

Synonyms
- Metriophyla lena Schaus, 1892

Species of moth

Uranophora lena is a moth in the subfamily Arctiinae. It was described by William Schaus in 1892. It is found in Peru.
