= Phostria microselene =

Scientific classification
- Kingdom: Animalia
- Phylum: Arthropoda
- Clade: Pancrustacea
- Class: Insecta
- Order: Lepidoptera
- Family: Crambidae
- Genus: Phostria
- Species: P. microselene

Binomial name
- Phostria microselene (Hampson, 1918)

Synonyms
- Boeotarcha microselene Hampson, 1918

Species of moth

Phostria microselene is a species of moth in the family Crambidae. It was described by George Hampson in 1918. It is found in Colombia.
