= Uranophora castra =

Scientific classification
- Kingdom: Animalia
- Phylum: Arthropoda
- Class: Insecta
- Order: Lepidoptera
- Superfamily: Noctuoidea
- Family: Erebidae
- Subfamily: Arctiinae
- Genus: Uranophora
- Species: U. castra

Binomial name
- Uranophora castra (Hampson, 1898)

Synonyms
- Napata castra Hampson, 1898

Species of moth

Uranophora castra is a moth in the subfamily Arctiinae. It was described by George Hampson in 1898. It is found in Paraná, Brazil.
