= Phostria sexguttata =

Scientific classification
- Kingdom: Animalia
- Phylum: Arthropoda
- Clade: Pancrustacea
- Class: Insecta
- Order: Lepidoptera
- Family: Crambidae
- Genus: Phostria
- Species: P. sexguttata

Binomial name
- Phostria sexguttata (Holland, 1920)

Synonyms
- Phryganodes sexguttata Holland, 1920

Species of moth

Phostria sexguttata is a species of moth in the family Crambidae. It was described by William Jacob Holland in 1920. It is found in the Democratic Republic of the Congo.
