= Phostria mungalis =

Scientific classification
- Kingdom: Animalia
- Phylum: Arthropoda
- Clade: Pancrustacea
- Class: Insecta
- Order: Lepidoptera
- Family: Crambidae
- Genus: Phostria
- Species: P. mungalis

Binomial name
- Phostria mungalis (Plötz, 1880)

Synonyms
- Botys mungalis Plötz, 1880; Phostria araeosoma Hampson, 1918

Species of moth

Phostria mungalis is a species of moth in the family Crambidae. It was described by Plötz in 1880. It is found in Cameroon.
