= Phostria obliqualis =

Scientific classification
- Kingdom: Animalia
- Phylum: Arthropoda
- Clade: Pancrustacea
- Class: Insecta
- Order: Lepidoptera
- Family: Crambidae
- Genus: Phostria
- Species: P. obliqualis

Binomial name
- Phostria obliqualis (Schaus, 1912)

Synonyms
- Phryganodes obliqualis Schaus, 1912

Species of moth

Phostria obliqualis is a species of moth in the family Crambidae. It was described by Schaus in 1912. It is found in Costa Rica.
