= Phostria monotona =

Scientific classification
- Kingdom: Animalia
- Phylum: Arthropoda
- Clade: Pancrustacea
- Class: Insecta
- Order: Lepidoptera
- Family: Crambidae
- Genus: Phostria
- Species: P. monotona

Binomial name
- Phostria monotona Amsel, 1956

Species of moth

Phostria monotona is a species of moth in the family Crambidae. It is found in Venezuela.
