= Uranophora lelex =

Scientific classification
- Domain: Eukaryota
- Kingdom: Animalia
- Phylum: Arthropoda
- Class: Insecta
- Order: Lepidoptera
- Superfamily: Noctuoidea
- Family: Erebidae
- Subfamily: Arctiinae
- Genus: Uranophora
- Species: U. lelex

Binomial name
- Uranophora lelex (H. Druce, 1890)

Synonyms
- Heliura lelex H. Druce, 1890

Species of moth

Uranophora lelex is a moth in the subfamily Arctiinae. It was described by Herbert Druce in 1890. It is found in Guatemala, Panama, Colombia, Venezuela and Ecuador.
