= Phostria buckleyi =

Scientific classification
- Kingdom: Animalia
- Phylum: Arthropoda
- Clade: Pancrustacea
- Class: Insecta
- Order: Lepidoptera
- Family: Crambidae
- Genus: Phostria
- Species: P. buckleyi

Binomial name
- Phostria buckleyi (H. Druce, 1902)

Synonyms
- Phryganodes buckleyi H. Druce, 1902

Species of moth

Phostria buckleyi is a species of moth in the family Crambidae. It was described by Herbert Druce in 1902. It is named for the naturalist Samuel Botsford Buckley. It is found in Ecuador.

== Description ==
The forewings are chrome yellow, darkest at the base of the costal margin. There is a rather wide band crossing the wing just beyond the cell, and the apex and outer margin are dark purplish brown. The hindwings are pale chrome yellow, but the apex and outer margin are purplish brown to the middle. A faint brown line extends from the end of the cell to the middle of the outer margin.
