= Hoterodes albiceps =

Scientific classification
- Kingdom: Animalia
- Phylum: Arthropoda
- Class: Insecta
- Order: Lepidoptera
- Family: Crambidae
- Genus: Hoterodes
- Species: H. albiceps

Binomial name
- Hoterodes albiceps (C. Felder, R. Felder & Rogenhofer, 1875)

Synonyms
- Botys albiceps C. Felder, R. Felder & Rogenhofer, 1875

Species of moth

Hoterodes albiceps is a moth in the family Crambidae. It was described by Cajetan Felder, Rudolf Felder and Alois Friedrich Rogenhofer in 1875. It is found in Colombia.
