= Phostria purpuralis =

Scientific classification
- Kingdom: Animalia
- Phylum: Arthropoda
- Clade: Pancrustacea
- Class: Insecta
- Order: Lepidoptera
- Family: Crambidae
- Genus: Phostria
- Species: P. purpuralis

Binomial name
- Phostria purpuralis (H. Druce, 1895)

Synonyms
- Erilusa purpuralis H. Druce, 1895

Species of moth

Phostria purpuralis is a species of moth in the family Crambidae. It was described by Herbert Druce in 1895. It is found in Costa Rica.

The forewings and hindwings are uniform dark glossy purplish brown, the inner margin of the latter greyish black.
