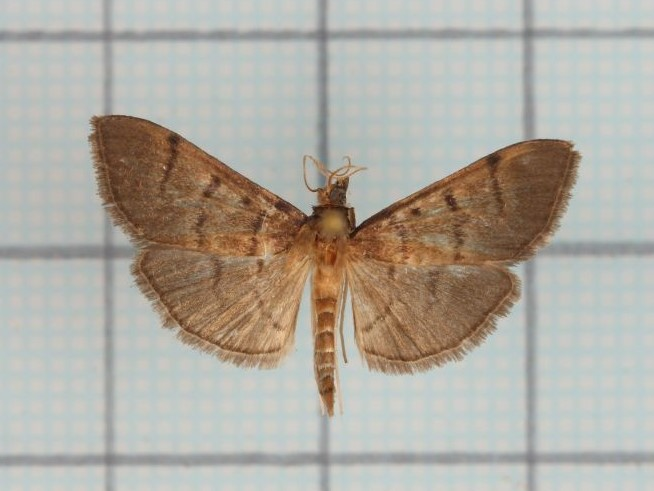

Scientific classification
- Kingdom: Animalia
- Phylum: Arthropoda
- Clade: Pancrustacea
- Class: Insecta
- Order: Lepidoptera
- Family: Crambidae
- Genus: Phostria
- Species: P. obscurata

Binomial name
- Phostria obscurata (Moore, 1885)

Synonyms
- Condega obscurata Moore, 1885; Phryganodes obscurata

= Phostria obscurata =

Species of moth

Phostria obscurata is a species of moth in the family Crambidae described by Frederic Moore in 1885. It is found in Taiwan, India, Sri Lanka, Singapore and Myanmar.

== Description ==
Adults are purplish brown. The forewings have an extremely indistinct blackish transverse outwardly curved narrow antemedial band, and an irregular postmedial band. There is a spot in the middle of the cell, and a streak at the end. The hindwings have a similar irregular discal band.
