= Phostria rufalis =

Scientific classification
- Kingdom: Animalia
- Phylum: Arthropoda
- Clade: Pancrustacea
- Class: Insecta
- Order: Lepidoptera
- Family: Crambidae
- Genus: Phostria
- Species: P. rufalis

Binomial name
- Phostria rufalis (Schaus, 1912)

Synonyms
- Phryganodes rufalis Schaus, 1912

Species of moth

Phostria rufalis is a species of moth in the family Crambidae. It was described by Schaus in 1912. It is found in Costa Rica.
