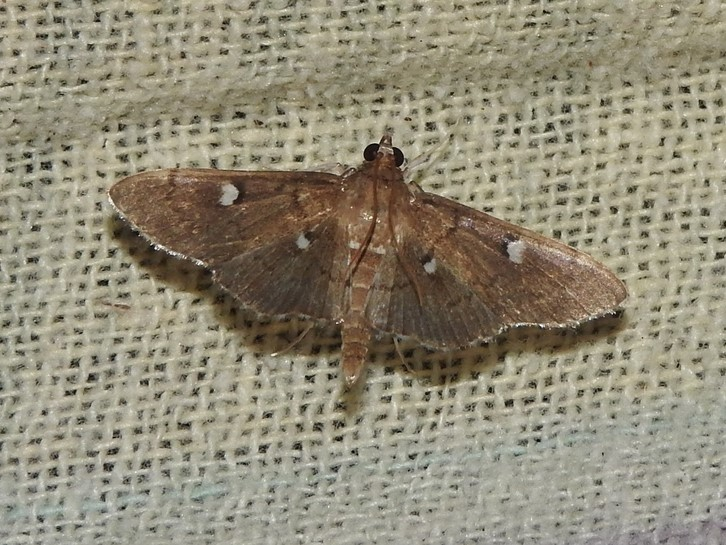

Scientific classification
- Kingdom: Animalia
- Phylum: Arthropoda
- Clade: Pancrustacea
- Class: Insecta
- Order: Lepidoptera
- Family: Crambidae
- Genus: Phostria
- Species: P. discipunctalis

Binomial name
- Phostria discipunctalis (Hampson, 1903)

Synonyms
- Phryganodes discipunctalis Hampson, 1903

= Phostria discipunctalis =

Species of moth

Phostria discipunctalis is a species of moth in the family Crambidae. It was described by George Hampson in 1903. It is found in India.
