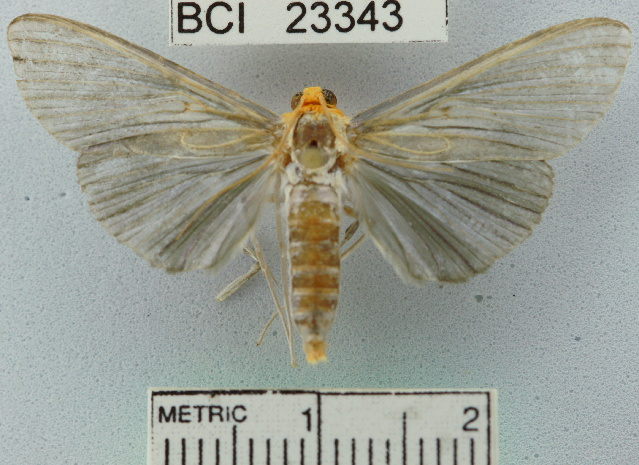

Scientific classification
- Kingdom: Animalia
- Phylum: Arthropoda
- Clade: Pancrustacea
- Class: Insecta
- Order: Lepidoptera
- Family: Crambidae
- Genus: Phostria
- Species: P. citrinalis

Binomial name
- Phostria citrinalis (H. Druce, 1895)

Synonyms
- Sarothronota citrinalis H. Druce, 1895; Pilocrocis apellalis Schaus, 1912; Sylepta escuintlalis Schaus, 1920; Sylepta escuintalis Munroe, 1995

= Phostria citrinalis =

Species of moth

Phostria citrinalis is a species of moth in the family Crambidae. It was described by Herbert Druce in 1895. It is found in Mexico (Guerrero, Jalisco), Costa Rica, Guatemala and Panama.
