= Phostria cleodalis =

Scientific classification
- Kingdom: Animalia
- Phylum: Arthropoda
- Clade: Pancrustacea
- Class: Insecta
- Order: Lepidoptera
- Family: Crambidae
- Genus: Phostria
- Species: P. cleodalis

Binomial name
- Phostria cleodalis Schaus, 1920

Species of moth

Phostria cleodalis is a moth in the family Crambidae. It was described by William Schaus in 1920. It is found in Bolivia.

== Description ==
The wingspan is about 29 mm. The wings are brown with a faint purplish tinge. The costal margin of the forewings is tinged with grey to the postmedial line, there is a faint brownish-white spot in the end of the cell, and one below cell, which is faintly darker edged. An outbent pale line is found on the discocellular, edged with darker brown lines and followed by a semihyaline white spot from veins 5-6, and a smaller spot above vein 6. Three similar spots are found from vein 5 to vein 2. The hindwings have faint hyaline spots in and beyond the cell and streaks on the interspaces below the cell to the inner margin on either side of the faint postmedial line. There is a dark streak on the discocellular.
