= Phostria gravitalis =

Scientific classification
- Kingdom: Animalia
- Phylum: Arthropoda
- Clade: Pancrustacea
- Class: Insecta
- Order: Lepidoptera
- Family: Crambidae
- Genus: Phostria
- Species: P. gravitalis

Binomial name
- Phostria gravitalis (Saalmüller, 1880)

Synonyms
- Botys gravitalis Saalmüller, 1880

Species of moth

Phostria gravitalis is a species of moth in the family Crambidae. It was described by Saalmüller in 1880. It is found in Madagascar.
