= Phostria aterrimalis =

Scientific classification
- Kingdom: Animalia
- Phylum: Arthropoda
- Clade: Pancrustacea
- Class: Insecta
- Order: Lepidoptera
- Family: Crambidae
- Genus: Phostria
- Species: P. aterrimalis

Binomial name
- Phostria aterrimalis Hampson, 1918

Species of moth

Phostria aterrimalis is a species of moth in the family Crambidae. It was described by George Hampson in 1918. It is found in Cameroon.

The wingspan is about 24 mm. The forewings and hindwings are very dark black brown.
