= Uranophora quadrimaculata =

Scientific classification
- Domain: Eukaryota
- Kingdom: Animalia
- Phylum: Arthropoda
- Class: Insecta
- Order: Lepidoptera
- Superfamily: Noctuoidea
- Family: Erebidae
- Subfamily: Arctiinae
- Genus: Uranophora
- Species: U. quadrimaculata

Binomial name
- Uranophora quadrimaculata (Möschler, 1872)

Synonyms
- Enagra quadrimaculata Möschler, 1872

Species of moth

Uranophora quadrimaculata is a moth in the subfamily Arctiinae. It was described by Heinrich Benno Möschler in 1872. It is found in Suriname and French Guiana.
