= Uranophora unifascia =

Scientific classification
- Domain: Eukaryota
- Kingdom: Animalia
- Phylum: Arthropoda
- Class: Insecta
- Order: Lepidoptera
- Superfamily: Noctuoidea
- Family: Erebidae
- Subfamily: Arctiinae
- Genus: Uranophora
- Species: U. unifascia

Binomial name
- Uranophora unifascia (Schaus, 1898)

Synonyms
- Napata unifascia Schaus, 1898

Species of moth

Uranophora unifascia is a moth in the subfamily Arctiinae. It was described by William Schaus in 1898. It is found in Ecuador.
