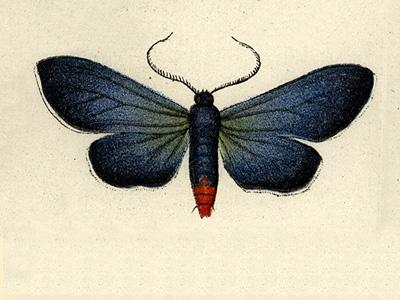
- Uranophora chalybea

Scientific classification
- Kingdom: Animalia
- Phylum: Arthropoda
- Clade: Pancrustacea
- Class: Insecta
- Order: Lepidoptera
- Superfamily: Noctuoidea
- Family: Erebidae
- Subfamily: Arctiinae
- Tribe: Arctiini
- Subtribe: Euchromiina
- Genus: Uranophora; Hübner, [1831]

Synonyms
- Napata Walker, 1854; Diabaena Felder, 1874; Metriophyla Butler, 1877

= Uranophora =

Genus of moths

Uranophora is a genus of moths in the family Erebidae. The genus was erected by Jacob Hübner in 1831.

== Species ==
- Uranophora albiplaga (Walker, 1854)
- Uranophora broadwayi (Schaus, 1896)
- Uranophora castra (Hampson, 1898)
- Uranophora chalybea Hübner, [1831]
- Uranophora cincticollis (Felder, 1874)
- Uranophora eucyane (Felder, 1874)
- Uranophora fenestrata (Druce, 1896)
- Uranophora guatemalena (Druce, 1884)
- Uranophora iridis (Hampson, 1898)
- Uranophora jynx (Geyer, 1832)
- Uranophora lelex (Druce, 1890)
- Uranophora lena (Schaus, 1892)
- Uranophora leucotelus (Butler, 1876)
- Uranophora munda (Walker, 1856)
- Uranophora quadrimaculata (Möschler, 1872)
- Uranophora quadristrigata (Hampson, 1898)
- Uranophora rabdonota (Hampson, 1898)
- Uranophora splendida (Herrich-Schäffer, [1854])
- Uranophora terminalis (Walker, 1854)
- Uranophora unifascia (Schaus, 1898)
- Uranophora walkeri (Druce, 1889)
