= Hoterodes ausonia =

Scientific classification
- Kingdom: Animalia
- Phylum: Arthropoda
- Class: Insecta
- Order: Lepidoptera
- Family: Crambidae
- Genus: Hoterodes
- Species: H. ausonia

Binomial name
- Hoterodes ausonia (Cramer, 1777)

Synonyms
- Phalaena ausonia Cramer, 1777; Hoterodes ausonialis Guenée, 1854; Margaronia canastralis Hübner, [1825]

Species of moth

Hoterodes ausonia is a moth in the family Crambidae. It was described by Pieter Cramer in 1777. It is found from Florida, through Central America (including Costa Rica, Belize and Honduras) to Suriname and Ecuador. It is also found in Cuba and Puerto Rico.

The wingspan is about 32 mm.
