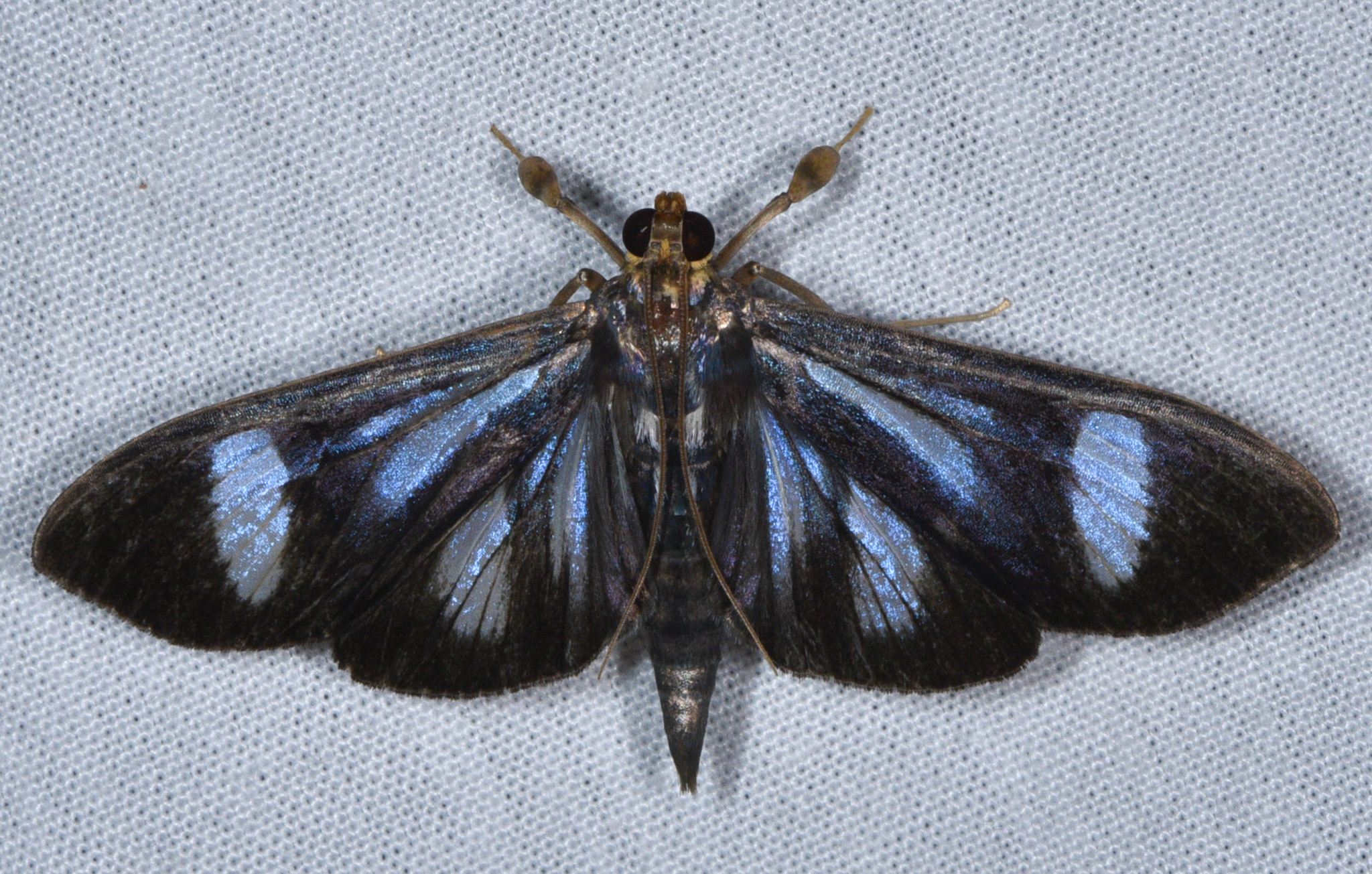

Scientific classification
- Kingdom: Animalia
- Phylum: Arthropoda
- Clade: Pancrustacea
- Class: Insecta
- Order: Lepidoptera
- Family: Crambidae
- Genus: Phostria
- Species: P. euagra

Binomial name
- Phostria euagra (C. Felder, R. Felder & Rogenhofer, 1875)

Synonyms
- Erilusa euagra C. Felder, R. Felder & Rogenhofer, 1875

= Phostria euagra =

Species of moth

Phostria euagra is a species of moth in the family Crambidae. It was described by Cajetan Felder, Rudolf Felder and Alois Friedrich Rogenhofer in 1875. It is found in Amazonas, Brazil.
