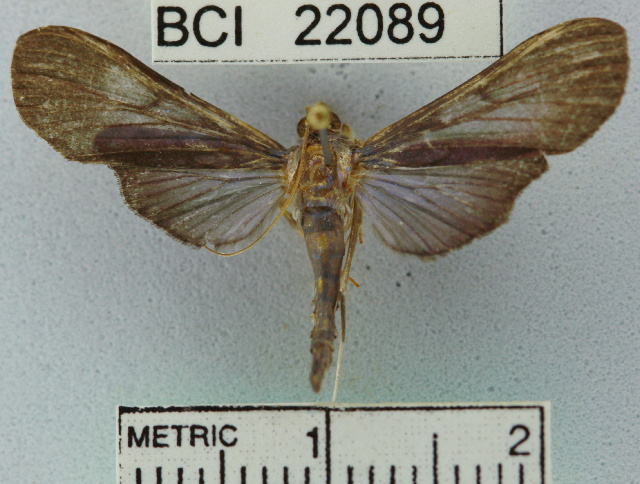

Scientific classification
- Kingdom: Animalia
- Phylum: Arthropoda
- Clade: Pancrustacea
- Class: Insecta
- Order: Lepidoptera
- Family: Crambidae
- Genus: Phostria
- Species: P. latiapicalis

Binomial name
- Phostria latiapicalis (Schaus, 1912)

Synonyms
- Phryganodes latiapicalis Schaus, 1912

= Phostria latiapicalis =

Species of moth

Phostria latiapicalis is a species of moth in the family Crambidae. It is found in Costa Rica and Panama.
