= Phostria indignalis =

Scientific classification
- Kingdom: Animalia
- Phylum: Arthropoda
- Clade: Pancrustacea
- Class: Insecta
- Order: Lepidoptera
- Family: Crambidae
- Genus: Phostria
- Species: P. indignalis

Binomial name
- Phostria indignalis Schaus, 1920

Species of moth

Phostria indignalis is a species of moth in the family Crambidae. It was described by William Schaus in 1920. It is found in Guatemala.

The wingspan is about 32 mm. The wings are dark brown.
