= Oricia (moth) =

Scientific classification
- Kingdom: Animalia
- Phylum: Arthropoda
- Clade: Pancrustacea
- Class: Insecta
- Order: Lepidoptera
- Superfamily: Noctuoidea
- Family: Notodontidae
- Tribe: Dioptini
- Genus: Oricia; Walker, 1854

Type species
- Oricia truncata Walker, 1854

Genus of moths

Oricia is a genus of moths of the family Notodontidae. It was described in 1854 by English entomologist Francis Walker and contains four species distributed in Central and South America.

== Species ==
This genus includes the following species:

- Oricia hillmani Miller, 2009 – Ecuador
- Oricia homalochroa (Felder and Felder, 1874) – Costa Rica, Guatemala, Nicaragua, Panama
- Oricia phryganeata (Warren, 1907) – Ecuador, Peru, Bolivia
- Oricia truncata Walker, 1854 – Belize, Costa Rica, Guatemala, Honduras, Mexico, Panama
