= Phostria melanophthalma =

Scientific classification
- Kingdom: Animalia
- Phylum: Arthropoda
- Clade: Pancrustacea
- Class: Insecta
- Order: Lepidoptera
- Family: Crambidae
- Genus: Phostria
- Species: P. melanophthalma

Binomial name
- Phostria melanophthalma Meyrick, 1933

Species of moth

Phostria melanophthalma is a species of moth in the family Crambidae. It was described by Edward Meyrick in 1933. It is found in the Democratic Republic of the Congo (Orientale, Equateur, East Kasai).
