= Uranophora fenestrata =

Scientific classification
- Domain: Eukaryota
- Kingdom: Animalia
- Phylum: Arthropoda
- Class: Insecta
- Order: Lepidoptera
- Superfamily: Noctuoidea
- Family: Erebidae
- Subfamily: Arctiinae
- Genus: Uranophora
- Species: U. fenestrata

Binomial name
- Uranophora fenestrata (H. Druce, 1896)

Synonyms
- Laemocharis fenestrata H. Druce, 1896

Species of moth

Uranophora fenestrata is a moth in the subfamily Arctiinae. It was described by Herbert Druce in 1896. It is found in São Paulo, Brazil.
