= Uranophora splendida =

Scientific classification
- Domain: Eukaryota
- Kingdom: Animalia
- Phylum: Arthropoda
- Class: Insecta
- Order: Lepidoptera
- Superfamily: Noctuoidea
- Family: Erebidae
- Subfamily: Arctiinae
- Genus: Uranophora
- Species: U. splendida

Binomial name
- Uranophora splendida (Herrich-Schäffer, [1854])

Synonyms
- Charidea splendida Herrich-Schäffer, [1854]; Sphinx argentiflua Esper, 1794; Sphinx argentiflua Martyn, 1797

Species of moth

Uranophora splendida is a moth in the subfamily Arctiinae. It was described by Gottlieb August Wilhelm Herrich-Schäffer in 1854. It is found in Colombia, Venezuela, French Guiana, Bolivia, and Brazil (particularly Rio de Janeiro).
