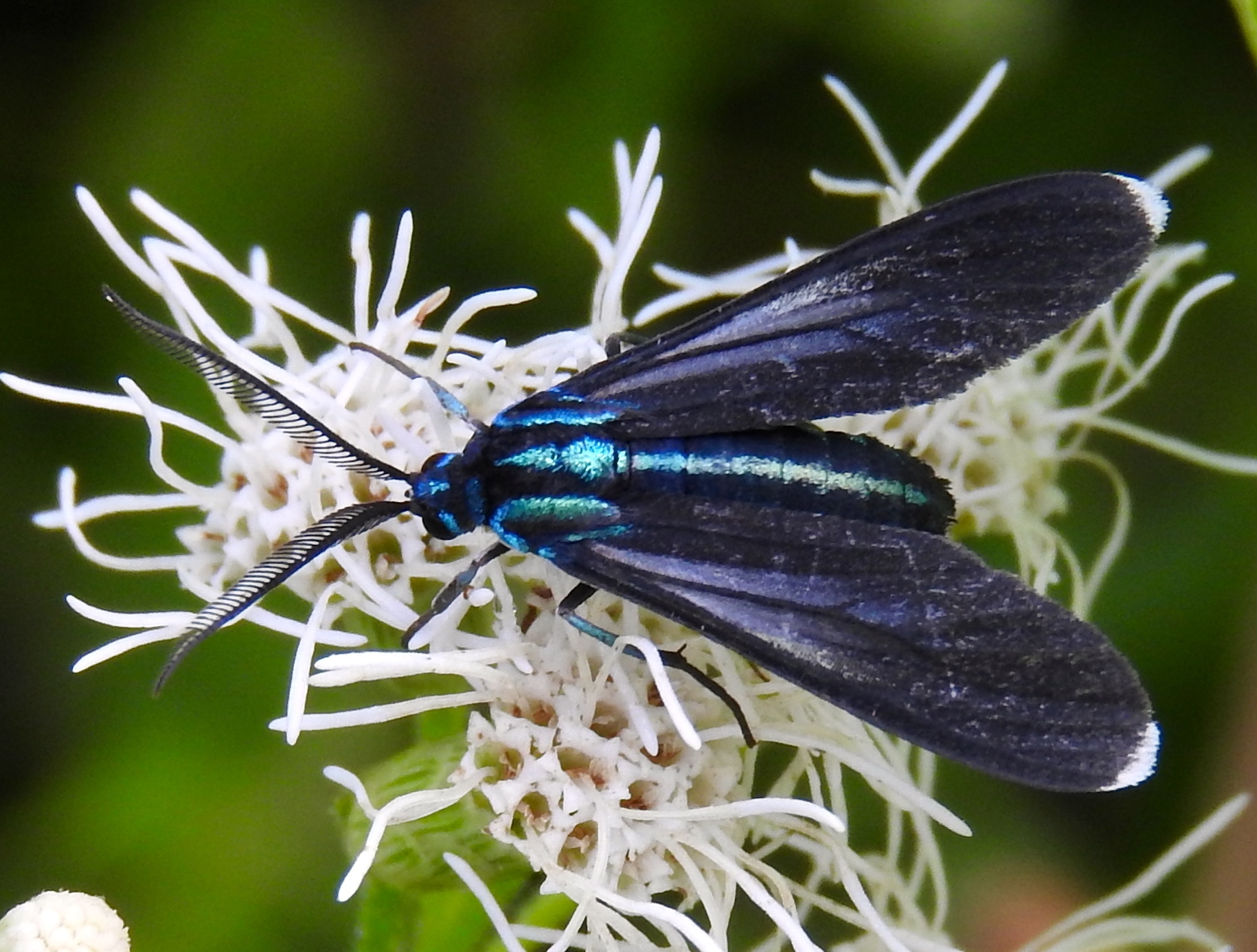

Scientific classification
- Kingdom: Animalia
- Phylum: Arthropoda
- Class: Insecta
- Order: Lepidoptera
- Superfamily: Noctuoidea
- Family: Erebidae
- Subfamily: Arctiinae
- Genus: Uranophora
- Species: U. leucotelus

Binomial name
- Uranophora leucotelus (Butler, 1876)

Synonyms
- Napata leucotelus Butler, 1876

= Uranophora leucotelus =

Species of moth

Uranophora leucotelus is a moth in the subfamily Arctiinae. It was described by Arthur Gardiner Butler in 1876. It is found in southern Texas, Mexico, Belize, Guatemala, Honduras, Costa Rica , Venezuela. and colombia

The wingspan is about 26 mm. Adults have been recorded feeding on flower nectar.
