= Phostria earlalis =

Scientific classification
- Kingdom: Animalia
- Phylum: Arthropoda
- Clade: Pancrustacea
- Class: Insecta
- Order: Lepidoptera
- Family: Crambidae
- Genus: Phostria
- Species: P. earlalis

Binomial name
- Phostria earlalis (C. Swinhoe, 1906)

Synonyms
- Saroscelis earlalis C. Swinhoe, 1906

Species of moth

Phostria earlalis is a species of moth in the family Crambidae. It was described by Charles Swinhoe in 1906. It is found on Borneo.
