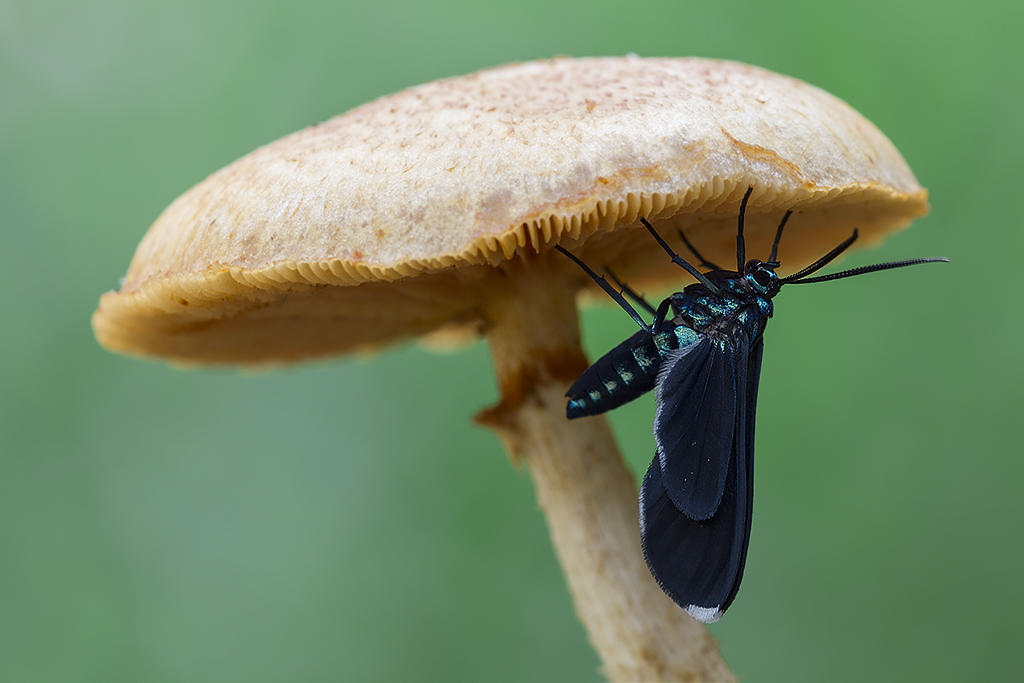

Scientific classification
- Kingdom: Animalia
- Phylum: Arthropoda
- Class: Insecta
- Order: Lepidoptera
- Superfamily: Noctuoidea
- Family: Erebidae
- Subfamily: Arctiinae
- Genus: Uranophora
- Species: U. albiplaga

Binomial name
- Uranophora albiplaga (Walker, 1854)

Synonyms
- Euchromia albiplaga Walker, 1854; Charidea apicalis Herrich-Schäffer, [1854]

= Uranophora albiplaga =

Species of moth

Uranophora albiplaga is a moth in the subfamily Arctiinae. It was described by Francis Walker in 1854. It is found in Mexico, Nicaragua, Costa Rica, Panama, Venezuela, Ecuador and Brazil.
