= Phostria jansei =

Scientific classification
- Kingdom: Animalia
- Phylum: Arthropoda
- Clade: Pancrustacea
- Class: Insecta
- Order: Lepidoptera
- Family: Crambidae
- Genus: Phostria
- Species: P. jansei

Binomial name
- Phostria jansei West, 1931

Species of moth

Phostria jansei is a species of moth in the family Crambidae. It was described by West in 1931. It is found in the Philippines (Luzon).
