= Phostria rutilalis =

Scientific classification
- Kingdom: Animalia
- Phylum: Arthropoda
- Clade: Pancrustacea
- Class: Insecta
- Order: Lepidoptera
- Family: Crambidae
- Genus: Phostria
- Species: P. rutilalis

Binomial name
- Phostria rutilalis (Walker, 1869)

Synonyms
- Vatica rutilalis Walker, 1869

Species of moth

Phostria rutilalis is a species of moth in the family Crambidae. It was described by Francis Walker in 1869. It is found in the Democratic Republic of the Congo.
