= Phostria persiusalis =

Scientific classification
- Kingdom: Animalia
- Phylum: Arthropoda
- Clade: Pancrustacea
- Class: Insecta
- Order: Lepidoptera
- Family: Crambidae
- Genus: Phostria
- Species: P. persiusalis

Binomial name
- Phostria persiusalis (Walker, 1859)

Synonyms
- Botys persiusalis Walker, 1859; Phostria confluentalis Warren, 1889

Species of moth

Phostria persiusalis is a species of moth in the family Crambidae, recorded from Brazil, Costa Rica, Venezuela, and Nicaragua. It was first described by Francis Walker in 1859, as Botys persiusalis.
