= Phostria schediusalis =

Scientific classification
- Kingdom: Animalia
- Phylum: Arthropoda
- Clade: Pancrustacea
- Class: Insecta
- Order: Lepidoptera
- Family: Crambidae
- Genus: Phostria
- Species: P. schediusalis

Binomial name
- Phostria schediusalis (Walker, 1859)

Synonyms
- Botys schediusalis Walker, 1859; Charema carbonalis Swinhoe, 1894

Species of moth

Phostria schediusalis is a species of moth in the family Crambidae. It was described by Francis Walker in 1859. It is found on Borneo and in India.
