= Phostria maculicostalis =

Scientific classification
- Kingdom: Animalia
- Phylum: Arthropoda
- Clade: Pancrustacea
- Class: Insecta
- Order: Lepidoptera
- Family: Crambidae
- Genus: Phostria
- Species: P. maculicostalis

Binomial name
- Phostria maculicostalis (Hampson, 1893)

Synonyms
- Coenostola maculicostalis Hampson, 1893

Species of moth

Phostria maculicostalis is a species of moth in the family Crambidae. It was described by George Hampson in 1893. It is found in Sri Lanka.
