= Uranophora cincticollis =

Scientific classification
- Kingdom: Animalia
- Phylum: Arthropoda
- Class: Insecta
- Order: Lepidoptera
- Superfamily: Noctuoidea
- Family: Erebidae
- Subfamily: Arctiinae
- Genus: Uranophora
- Species: U. cincticollis

Binomial name
- Uranophora cincticollis (Felder, 1874)

Synonyms
- Diabaena cincticollis Felder, 1874

Species of moth

Uranophora cincticollis is a moth in the subfamily Arctiinae. It was described by Baron Cajetan von Felder in 1874. It is found in Colombia.
