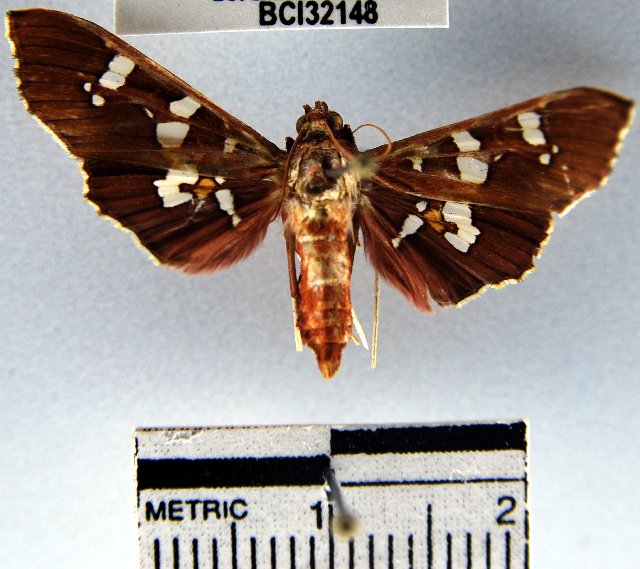

Scientific classification
- Kingdom: Animalia
- Phylum: Arthropoda
- Clade: Pancrustacea
- Class: Insecta
- Order: Lepidoptera
- Family: Crambidae
- Genus: Phostria
- Species: P. temira

Binomial name
- Phostria temira (Stoll in Cramer & Stoll, 1781)

Synonyms
- Phalaena Pyralis temira Stoll in Cramer & Stoll, 1781; Pilocrocis omophanes Meyrick, 1936

= Phostria temira =

Species of moth

Phostria temira is a species of moth in the family Crambidae. It was described by Caspar Stoll in 1781. It is found in Suriname, Costa Rica, Panama and Mexico.
