= Phostria vitrifera =

Scientific classification
- Kingdom: Animalia
- Phylum: Arthropoda
- Clade: Pancrustacea
- Class: Insecta
- Order: Lepidoptera
- Family: Crambidae
- Genus: Phostria
- Species: P. vitrifera

Binomial name
- Phostria vitrifera (Dognin, 1911)

Synonyms
- Phryganodes vitrifera Dognin, 1911

Species of moth

Phostria vitrifera is a species of moth in the family Crambidae. It is found in French Guiana and Costa Rica.
