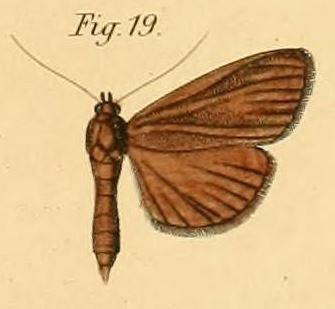

Scientific classification
- Kingdom: Animalia
- Phylum: Arthropoda
- Clade: Pancrustacea
- Class: Insecta
- Order: Lepidoptera
- Family: Crambidae
- Genus: Phostria
- Species: P. fumarialis

Binomial name
- Phostria fumarialis (Dewitz, 1881)

Synonyms
- Botys fumarialis Dewitz, 1881

= Phostria fumarialis =

Species of moth

Phostria fumarialis is a species of moth in the family Crambidae. It was described by Hermann Dewitz in 1881. It is found in Angola.
