= Phostria hampsonialis =

Scientific classification
- Kingdom: Animalia
- Phylum: Arthropoda
- Clade: Pancrustacea
- Class: Insecta
- Order: Lepidoptera
- Family: Crambidae
- Genus: Phostria
- Species: P. hampsonialis

Binomial name
- Phostria hampsonialis Schaus, 1920

Synonyms
- Phryganodes tridentalis Hampson, 1912 (preocc.)

Species of moth

Phostria hampsonialis is a species of moth in the family Crambidae. It was described by Schaus in 1920. It is found in Ghana.
