= Phostria tamsina =

Scientific classification
- Kingdom: Animalia
- Phylum: Arthropoda
- Clade: Pancrustacea
- Class: Insecta
- Order: Lepidoptera
- Family: Crambidae
- Genus: Phostria
- Species: P. tamsina

Binomial name
- Phostria tamsina Ghesquière, 1942

Species of moth

Phostria tamsina is a species of moth in the family Crambidae. It was described by Jean Ghesquière in 1942. It is found in the former province of Équateur in the Democratic Republic of the Congo.
