= Phostria crithonalis =

Scientific classification
- Kingdom: Animalia
- Phylum: Arthropoda
- Clade: Pancrustacea
- Class: Insecta
- Order: Lepidoptera
- Family: Crambidae
- Genus: Phostria
- Species: P. crithonalis

Binomial name
- Phostria crithonalis (Walker, 1859)

Synonyms
- Botys crithonalis Walker, 1859

Species of moth

Phostria crithonalis is a species of moth in the family Crambidae. It was described by Francis Walker in 1859. It is found on Borneo.
