= Phostria dispila =

Scientific classification
- Kingdom: Animalia
- Phylum: Arthropoda
- Clade: Pancrustacea
- Class: Insecta
- Order: Lepidoptera
- Family: Crambidae
- Genus: Phostria
- Species: P. dispila

Binomial name
- Phostria dispila Ghesquière, 1940

Species of moth

Phostria dispila is a species of moth in the family Crambidae. It was described by Jean Ghesquière in 1940. It is found in the former province of Équateur in the Democratic Republic of the Congo.
