= Phostria soricalis =

Scientific classification
- Kingdom: Animalia
- Phylum: Arthropoda
- Clade: Pancrustacea
- Class: Insecta
- Order: Lepidoptera
- Family: Crambidae
- Genus: Phostria
- Species: P. soricalis

Binomial name
- Phostria soricalis (Snellen, 1899)

Synonyms
- Hoplisa soricalis Snellen, 1899

Species of moth

Phostria soricalis is a species of moth in the family Crambidae. It was described by Snellen in 1899. It is found in Indonesia (Java).
