= Phostria luridalis =

Scientific classification
- Kingdom: Animalia
- Phylum: Arthropoda
- Clade: Pancrustacea
- Class: Insecta
- Order: Lepidoptera
- Family: Crambidae
- Genus: Phostria
- Species: P. luridalis

Binomial name
- Phostria luridalis Ghesquière, 1942

Species of moth

Phostria luridalis is a species of moth in the family Crambidae. It was described by Jean Ghesquière in 1942. It is found in the former province of Équateur in the Democratic Republic of the Congo.
