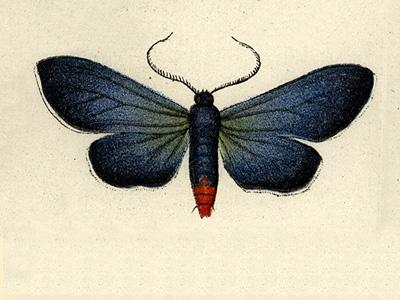

Scientific classification
- Kingdom: Animalia
- Phylum: Arthropoda
- Clade: Pancrustacea
- Class: Insecta
- Order: Lepidoptera
- Superfamily: Noctuoidea
- Family: Erebidae
- Subfamily: Arctiinae
- Genus: Uranophora
- Species: U. chalybea

Binomial name
- Uranophora chalybea Hübner, [1831]

Synonyms
- Napata chalybea

= Uranophora chalybea =

Species of moth

Uranophora chalybea is a moth of the subfamily Arctiinae. It was described by Jacob Hübner in 1831. It is found on Cuba and Jamaica.

Adults are brilliant metallic blue.
