= Phostria linealis =

Scientific classification
- Kingdom: Animalia
- Phylum: Arthropoda
- Clade: Pancrustacea
- Class: Insecta
- Order: Lepidoptera
- Family: Crambidae
- Genus: Phostria
- Species: P. linealis

Binomial name
- Phostria linealis (Guenée, 1854)

Synonyms
- Lonchodes linealis Guenée, 1854; Phryganodes rotundalis Hampson, 1912

Species of moth

Phostria linealis is a species of moth in the family Crambidae. It was described by Achille Guenée in 1854. It is found in French Guiana and Suriname.
