= Phostria hesusalis =

Scientific classification
- Kingdom: Animalia
- Phylum: Arthropoda
- Clade: Pancrustacea
- Class: Insecta
- Order: Lepidoptera
- Family: Crambidae
- Genus: Phostria
- Species: P. hesusalis

Binomial name
- Phostria hesusalis (Walker, 1859)

Synonyms
- Botys hesusalis Walker, 1859; Phostria hemusalis Ghesquière, 1942

Species of moth

Phostria hesusalis is a species of moth in the family Crambidae. It was described by Francis Walker in 1859. It is found in Cameroon, the Republic of the Congo, the Democratic Republic of the Congo, Equatorial Guinea, Nigeria, Sierra Leone and Togo.
