= Oricia homalochroa =

Scientific classification
- Kingdom: Animalia
- Phylum: Arthropoda
- Clade: Pancrustacea
- Class: Insecta
- Order: Lepidoptera
- Superfamily: Noctuoidea
- Family: Notodontidae
- Genus: Oricia
- Species: O. homalochroa

Binomial name
- Oricia homalochroa (C. Felder & R. Felder, 1874)

Synonyms
- Pyralopsis homalochroa C. Felder & R. Felder, 1874; Pyralopsis damalis Schaus, 1912

Species of moth

Oricia homalochroa is a moth of the family Notodontidae first described by Cajetan and Rudolf Felder in 1874. It is found from Guatemala south to Panama.They have a diet of nectar and fruit.
