= Phostria sericealis =

Scientific classification
- Kingdom: Animalia
- Phylum: Arthropoda
- Clade: Pancrustacea
- Class: Insecta
- Order: Lepidoptera
- Family: Crambidae
- Genus: Phostria
- Species: P. sericealis

Binomial name
- Phostria sericealis (Pagenstecher, 1900)

Synonyms
- Hoterodes sericealis Pagenstecher, 1900

Species of moth

Phostria sericealis is a species of moth in the family Crambidae. It was described by Pagenstecher in 1900. It is found in Papua New Guinea.
