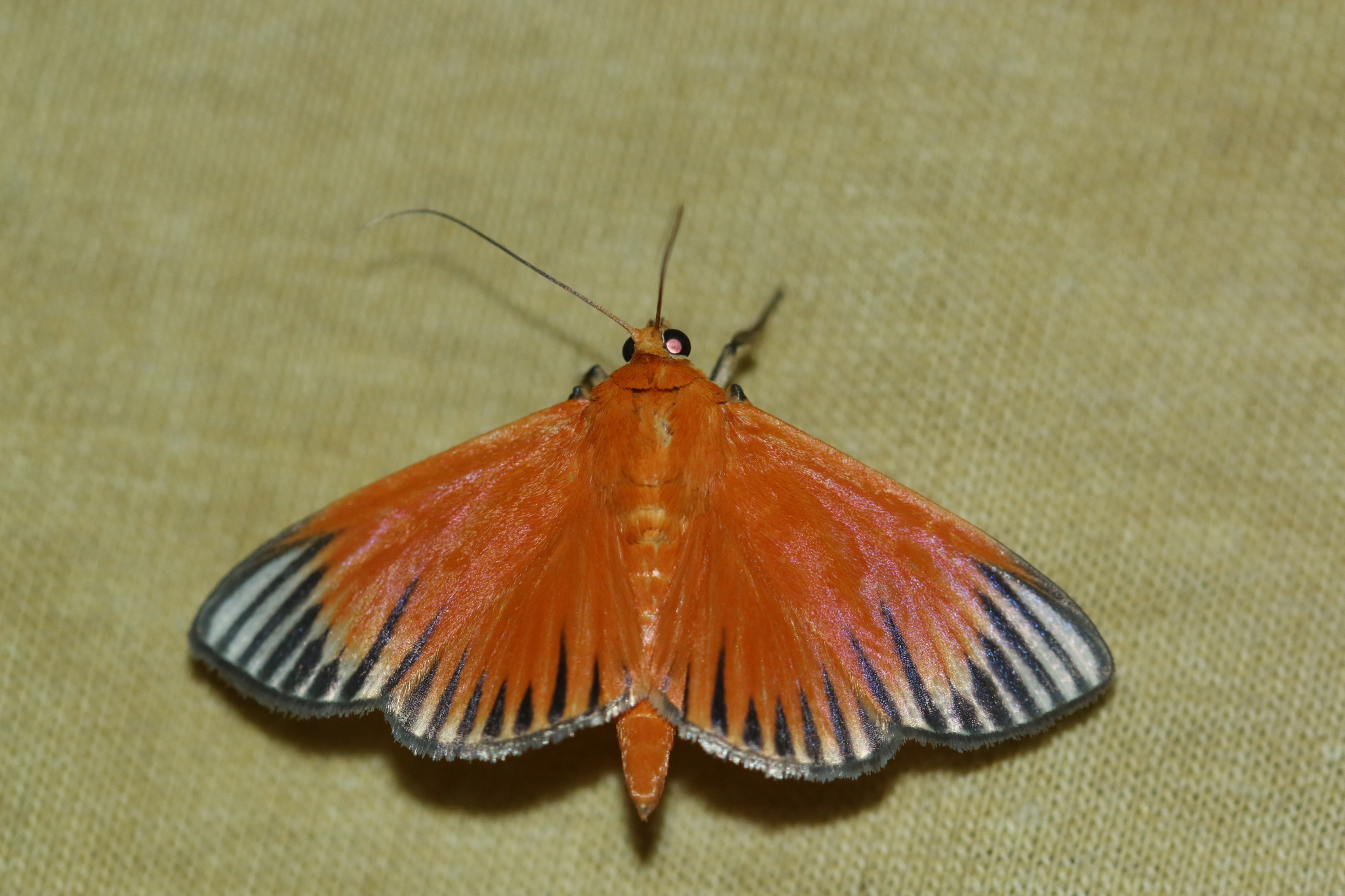

Scientific classification
- Kingdom: Animalia
- Phylum: Arthropoda
- Clade: Pancrustacea
- Class: Insecta
- Order: Lepidoptera
- Family: Crambidae
- Genus: Phostria
- Species: P. mapetalis

Binomial name
- Phostria mapetalis (Schaus, 1912)

Synonyms
- Pilocrocis mapetalis Schaus, 1912

= Phostria mapetalis =

Species of moth

Phostria mapetalis is a species of moth in the family Crambidae. It was described by Schaus in 1912. It is found in Costa Rica and Honduras.
