= Phostria regalis =

Scientific classification
- Kingdom: Animalia
- Phylum: Arthropoda
- Clade: Pancrustacea
- Class: Insecta
- Order: Lepidoptera
- Family: Crambidae
- Genus: Phostria
- Species: P. regalis

Binomial name
- Phostria regalis (Butler, 1882)

Synonyms
- Hoterodes regalis Butler, 1882

Species of moth

Phostria regalis is a species of moth in the family Crambidae. It was described by Arthur Gardiner Butler in 1882. It is found in Papua New Guinea.
