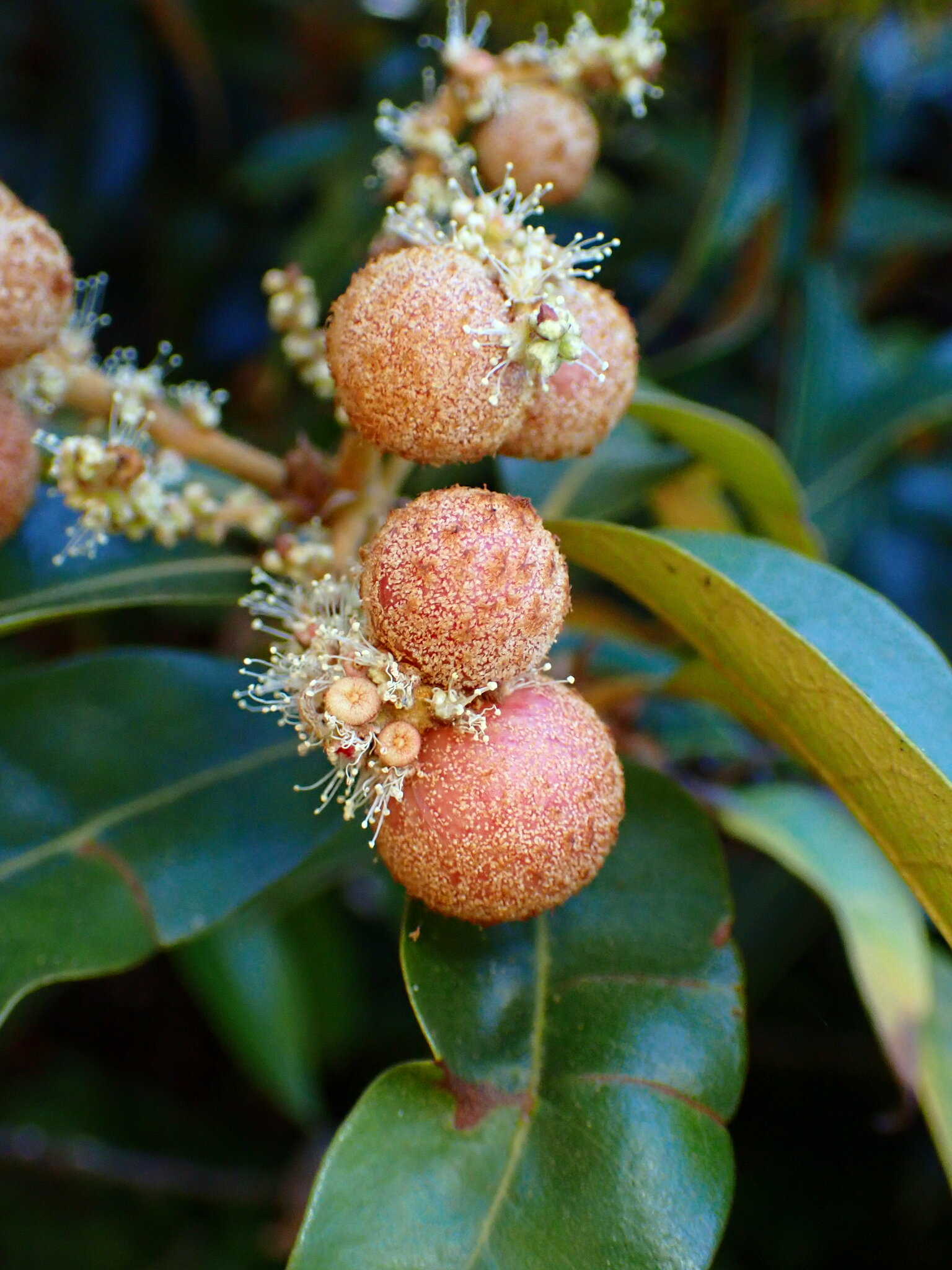
- San Mateo County, California, 2022

Scientific classification
- Kingdom: Animalia
- Phylum: Arthropoda
- Class: Insecta
- Order: Hymenoptera
- Family: Cynipidae
- Genus: Dryocosmus
- Species: D. castanopsidis

Binomial name
- Dryocosmus castanopsidis (Beutenmueller, 1917)

= Dryocosmus castanopsidis =

North American gall-inducing wasp

Dryocosmus castanopsidis, also known as the chinquapin flower gall wasp, is a species of cynipid wasp that induces galls on the flowers of giant chinquapin and bush chinquapin on the west coast of North America. The husk and flesh of the galls are red, with a "golden bloom" on the husk, and the central larval chamber has a green tint.
