= Acrocercops insulariella =

Scientific classification
- Kingdom: Animalia
- Phylum: Arthropoda
- Class: Insecta
- Order: Lepidoptera
- Family: Gracillariidae
- Genus: Acrocercops
- Species: A. insulariella

Binomial name
- Acrocercops insulariella Opler, 1971

Species of moth

Acrocercops insulariella is a moth of the family Gracillariidae. It is known from the United States (California).

The larvae feed on Chrysolepis chrysophylla, Chrysolepis sempervirens, Quercus agrifolia, Quercus chrysolepis, Quercus garryana, Quercus tomentella, Quercus vaccinifolia and Quercus wislizeni. They probably mine the leaves of their host plant.
