= Chinquapin Mountain =

Mountain in Oregon, United States

Coordinates: 42.1521742°N 122.4372685°W

Chinquapin Mountain is a summit in the U.S. state of Oregon. The elevation is 6,089 feet (1,856 m).

Chinquapin Mountain was named for the Chinquapin trees in the area.

Chinquapin Mountain and nearby Little Chinquapin Mountain are both shield volcanoes. They contain olivine basalt.
