= Chrysolepis (disambiguation) =

Chrysolepis may refer to:

- Chrysolepis (fish), a fish genus in the order Osteolepidida
- Chrysolepis (plant), a plant genus in the family Fagaceae
