= Chrysolepicynips =

Scientific classification
- Kingdom: Animalia
- Phylum: Arthropoda
- Clade: Pancrustacea
- Class: Insecta
- Order: Hymenoptera
- Family: Cynipidae
- Genus: Chrysolepicynips; Stone, Nicholls, Melika & Tang

Genus of wasps

Chrysolepicynips is a genus of gall wasp. The genus was erected in 2026 and encompasses former members of the genus Dryocosmus which use chinquapins as their hosts. It can be separated from Dryocosmus based on the following characteristics: Presence of white setae on head and mesosoma; mesoscutellar foveae divided by an elevated narrow central carina; and lateral propodeal carinae being sub-parallel.

== Species ==
- Chrysolepicynips castanopsidis (Beutenmüller, 1917) (Chinquapin flower gall wasp)
- Chrysolepicynips demartinii (Melika, Nicholls & Stone, 2018)
- Chrysolepicynips juliae (Melika, Nicholls & Stone, 2018)
- Chrysolepicynips rileypokei (Morita & Buffington, 2009)
