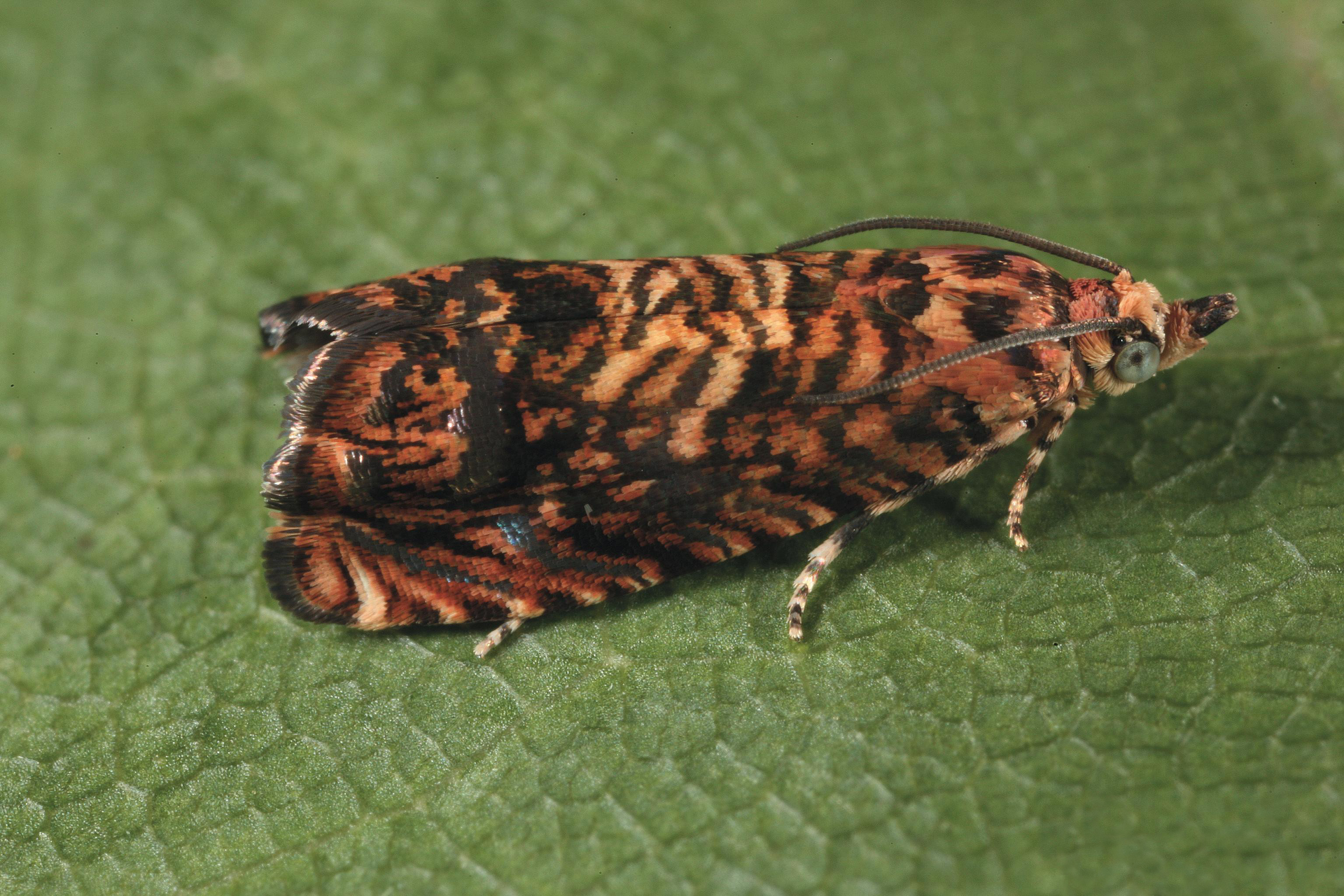

Scientific classification
- Kingdom: Animalia
- Phylum: Arthropoda
- Class: Insecta
- Order: Lepidoptera
- Family: Tortricidae
- Genus: Pammene
- Species: P. amygdalana

Binomial name
- Pammene amygdalana (Duponchel in Godart, 1842)

Synonyms
- Grapholitha amygdalana Duponchel in Godart, 1842; Carpocapsa gallanum Graells, 1858; Carpocapsa gallarum Graells, 1858; Carpocapsa kockeilana Freyer, 1845; Pammene koekeilana Razowski, 2003; Carpocapsa kokeilana Freyer, 1845; Pammene lobarczewskii zelleri Schulze, 1918

= Pammene amygdalana =

Species of moth

Pammene amygdalana is a species of moth of the family Tortricidae. It is found from Belgium and Germany to the Iberian Peninsula, Italy, Austria and Hungary and from France to Romania and Bulgaria.

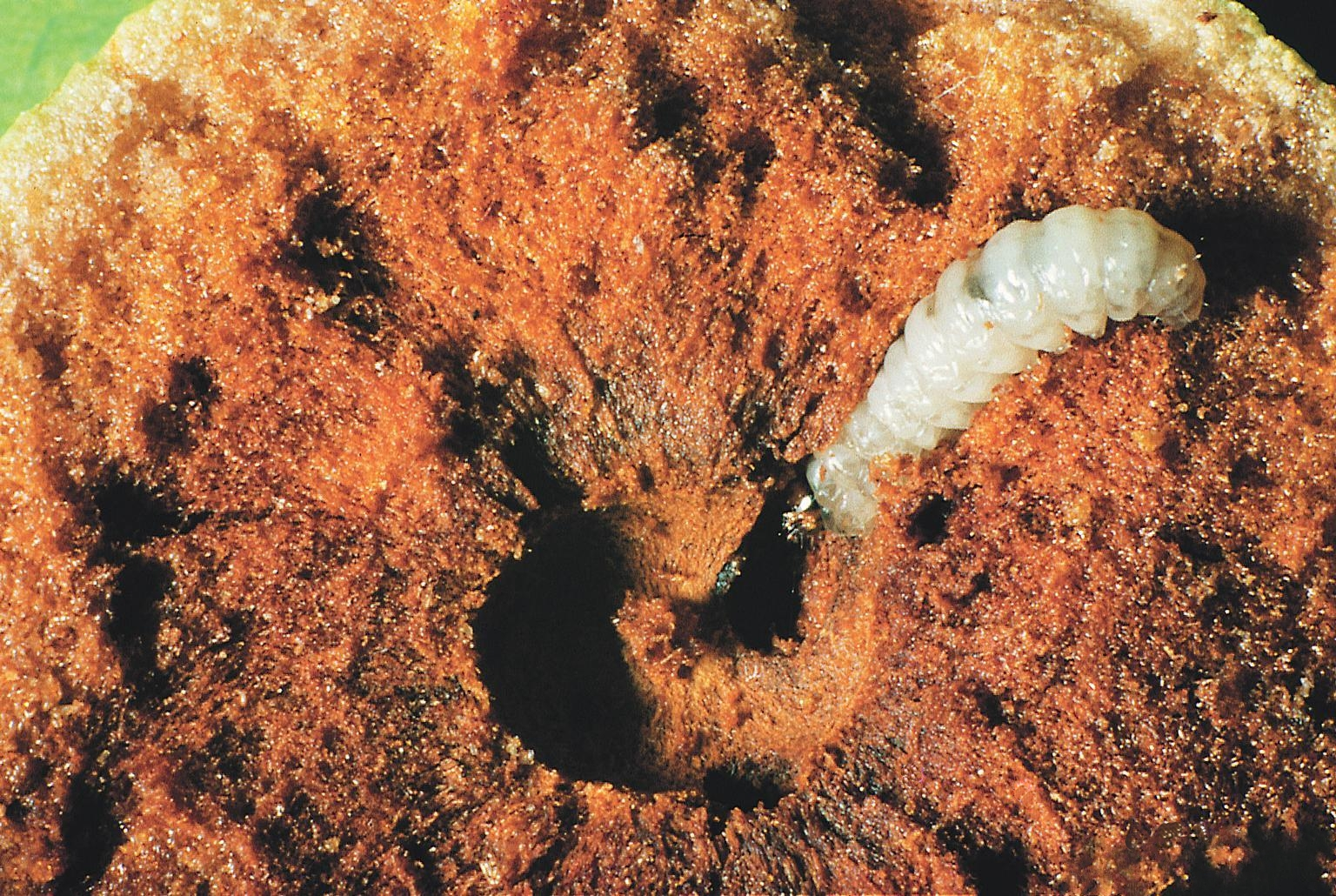
Larva

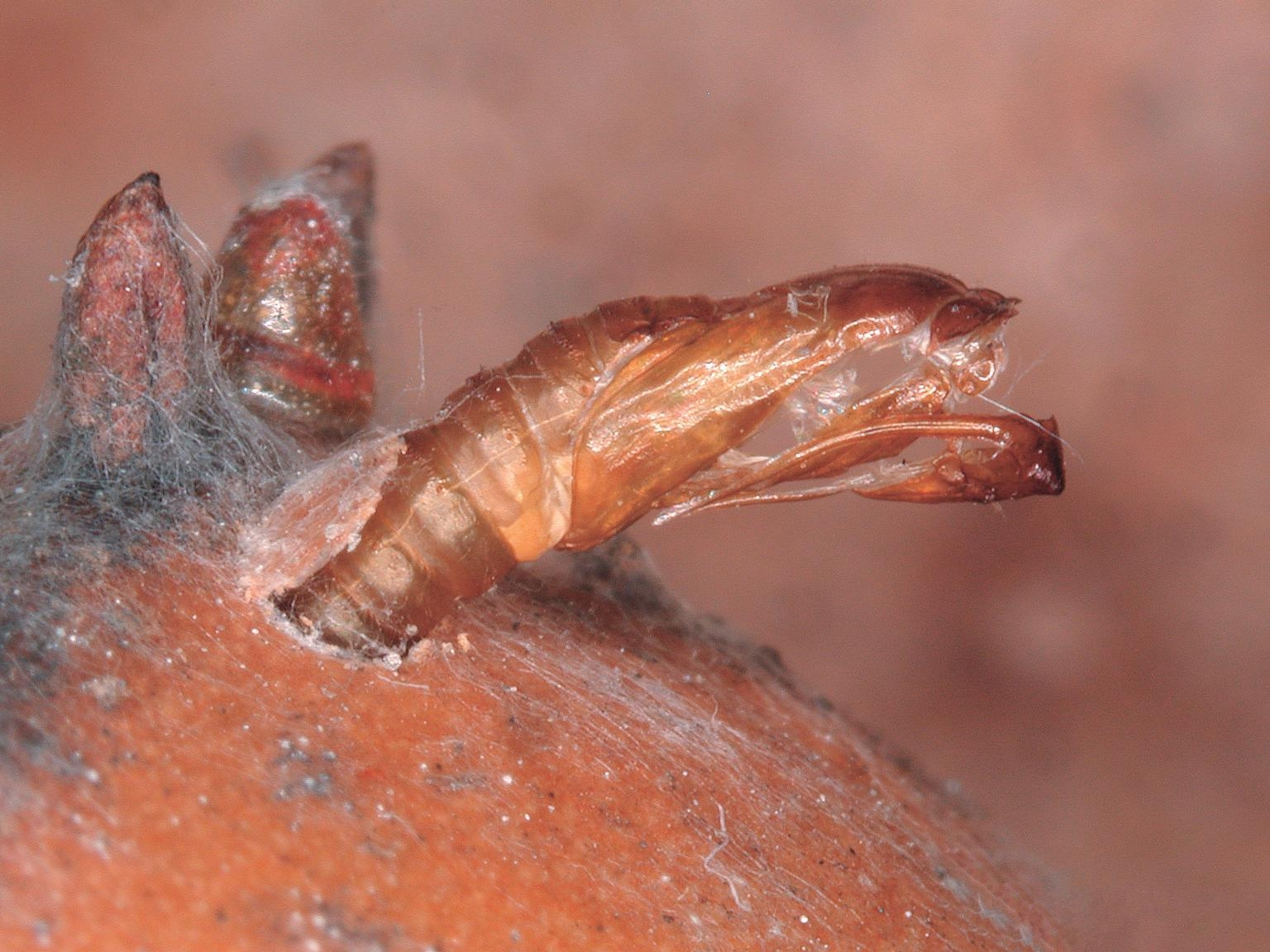
Pupa

The wingspan is 12–15 mm. Adults are on wing from April to August in one generation per year.

The larvae live as an inquiline in cynipid galls on various plant species, including Andricus kollari, Andricus conglomeratus, Andricus hungaricus, Andricus lucidus and Aphelonyx cerricola. They often consume the cynipid larva as well as gall tissue.
