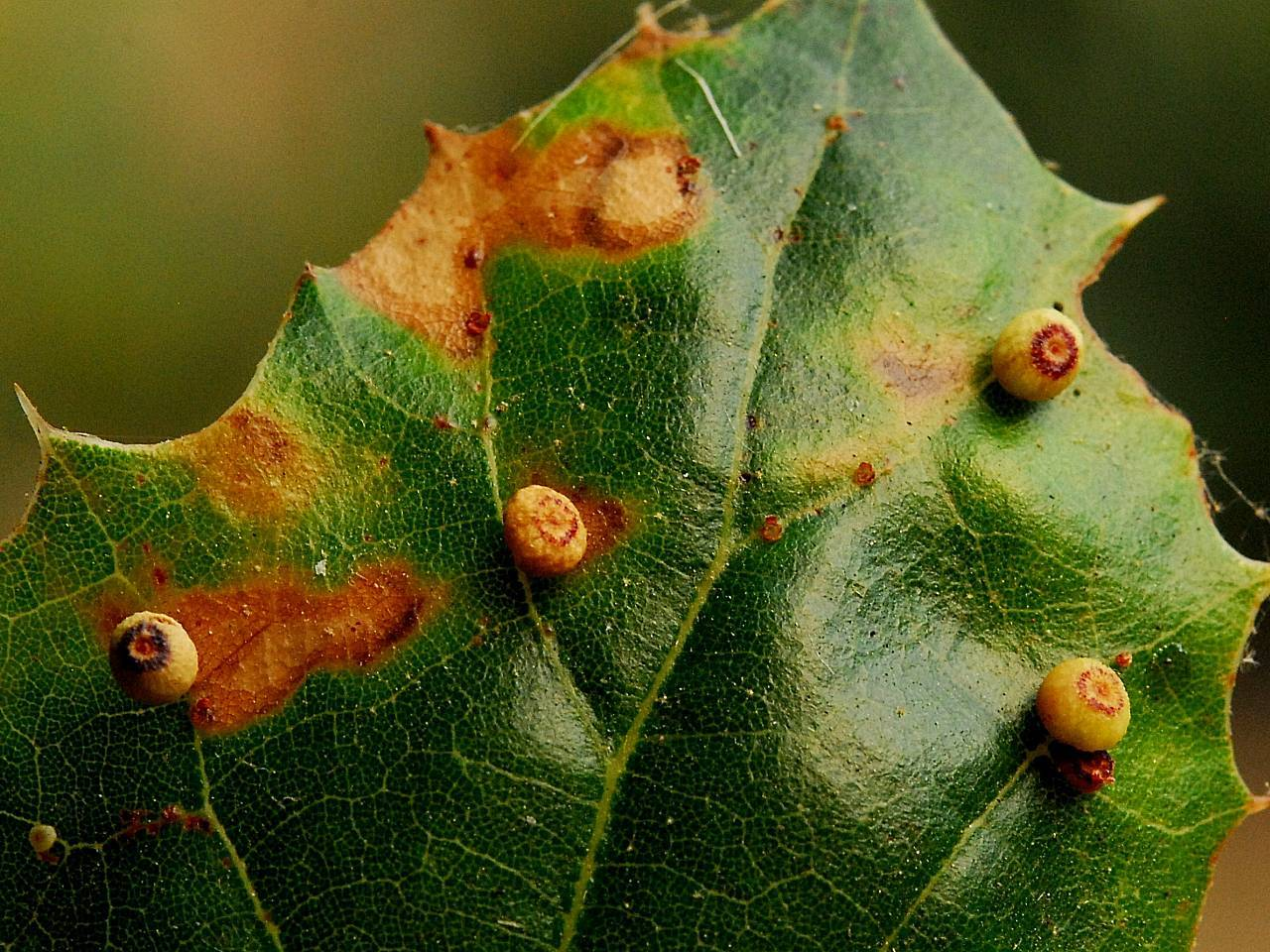
- Galls induced by Dryocosmus minusculus, Coyote Valley Open Space District, San Jose, California, 2017

Scientific classification
- Kingdom: Animalia
- Phylum: Arthropoda
- Class: Insecta
- Order: Hymenoptera
- Family: Cynipidae
- Genus: Dryocosmus
- Species: D. minusculus

Binomial name
- Dryocosmus minusculus Weld, 1952

= Dryocosmus minusculus =

North American gall-inducing wasp

Dryocosmus minusculus is an abundant species of cynipid wasp that produces galls on oak trees in California in North America. Commonly known as the pumpkin gall wasp, the wasp oviposits on the leaves of Quercus agrifolia, Quercus wislizenii, and Quercus kelloggii. In spring and summer, larvae induce round galls reaching 1 mm across. Fresh galls are pale with darker centers. Adult wasps emerge the following spring.
