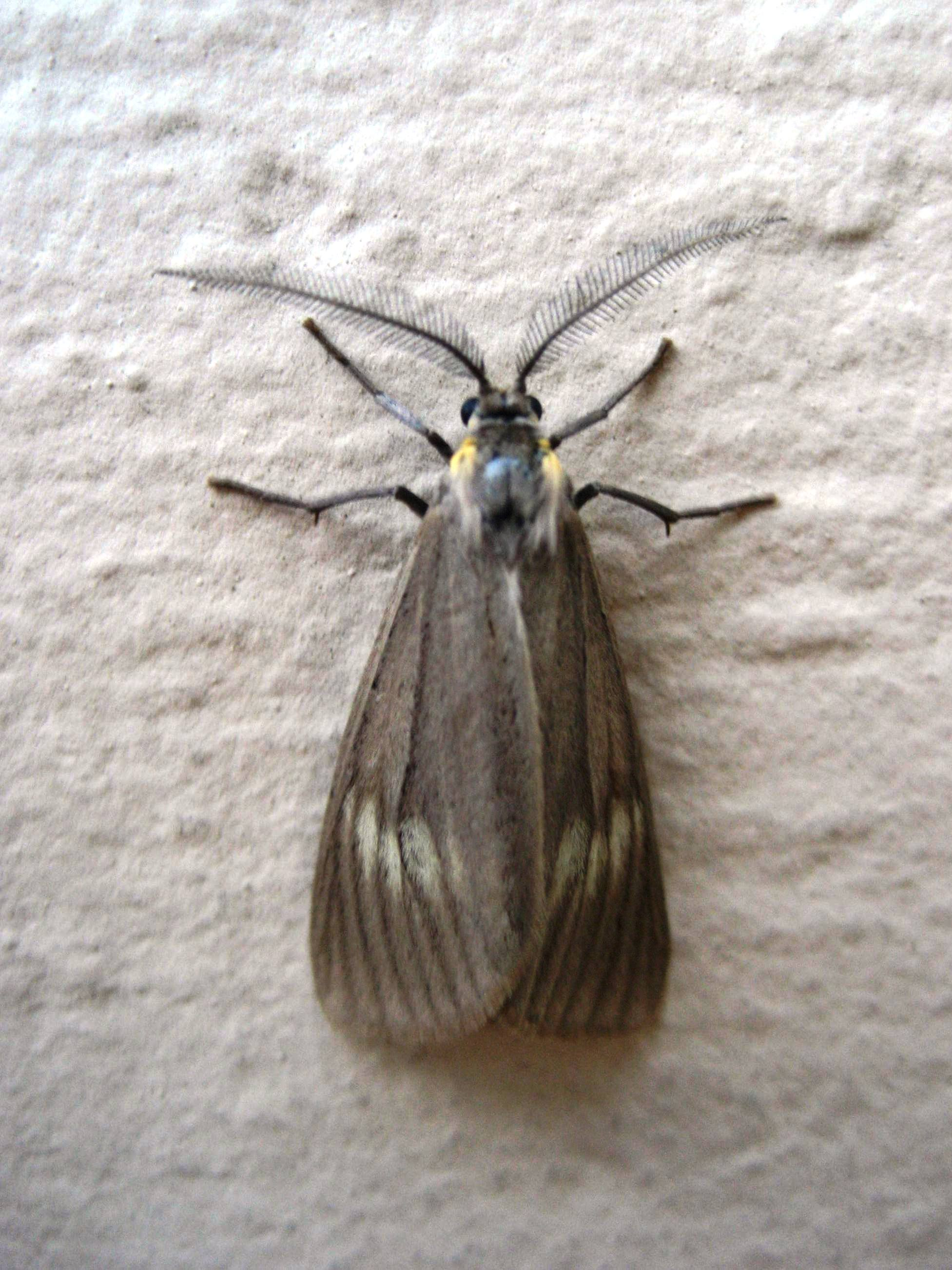
- Phryganidia californica

Scientific classification
- Kingdom: Animalia
- Phylum: Arthropoda
- Clade: Pancrustacea
- Class: Insecta
- Order: Lepidoptera
- Superfamily: Noctuoidea
- Family: Notodontidae
- Tribe: Dioptini
- Genus: Phryganidia; Packard, 1864

= Phryganidia =

Genus of moths

Phryganidia is a genus of moths of the family Notodontidae. It consists of the following species:

- Phryganidia californica Packard, 1864
- Phryganidia naxa (Druce, 1887)
- Phryganidia chihuahua Miller, 1987
