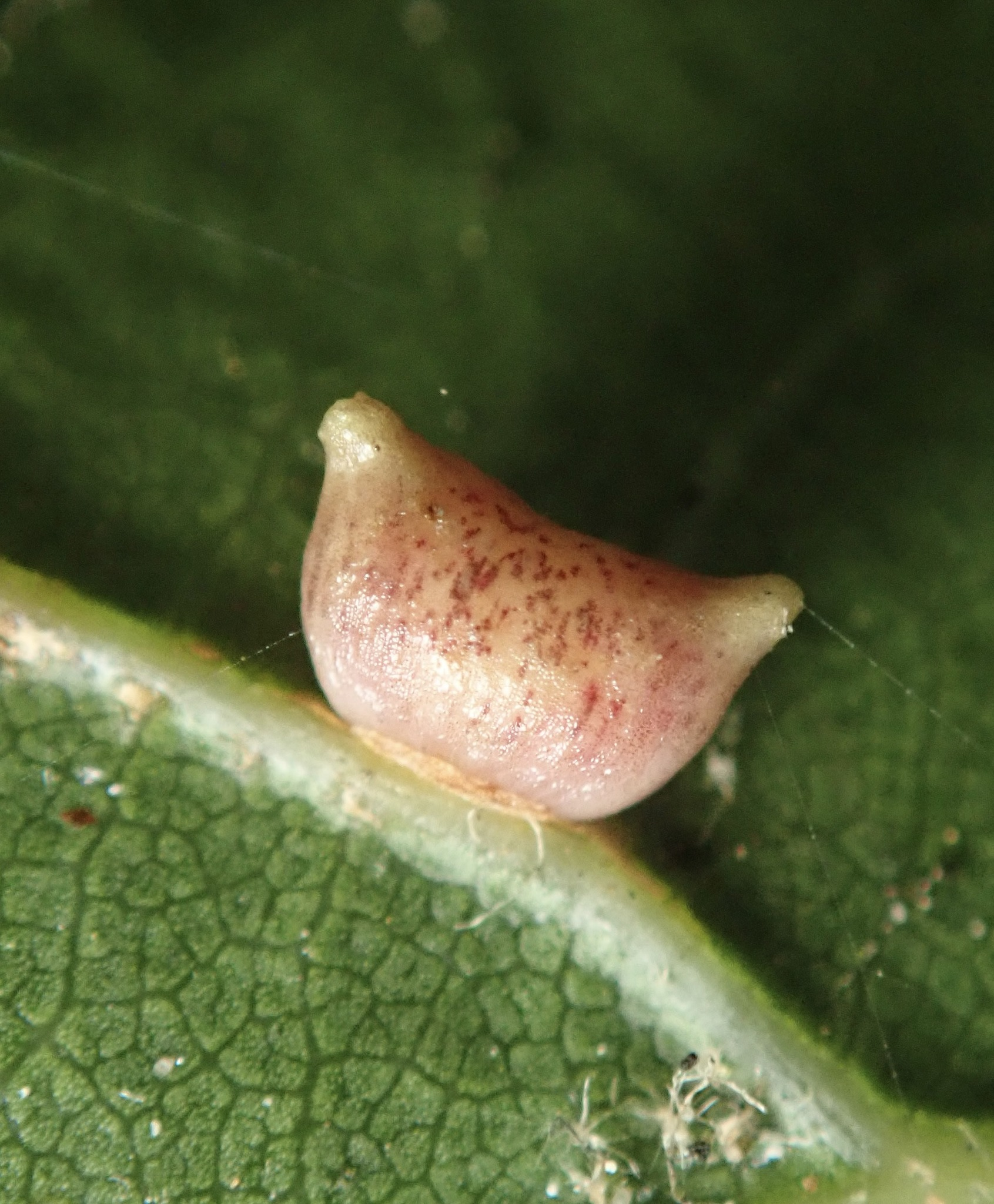
- Photographed 2023 near Pacifica, California

Scientific classification
- Kingdom: Animalia
- Phylum: Arthropoda
- Class: Insecta
- Order: Hymenoptera
- Family: Cynipidae
- Genus: Dryocosmus
- Species: D. dubiosus

Binomial name
- Dryocosmus dubiosus (Fullaway, 1911)

= Dryocosmus dubiosus =

North American gall-inducing wasp

Dryocosmus dubiosus is an abundant species of cynipid wasp that produces galls on oak trees in California in North America. Commonly known as the two-horned gall wasp, the wasp oviposits on the leaves and catkins of coast live oaks and interior live oaks. After the eggs hatch, the resulting gall form looks like it has a set of bull's horns.

According to the University of California center for integrated pest management, "Damage from the leaf-galling generation of two-horned oak gall wasps is often confused with damage from fungi that cause oak twig blight and certain beetles e.g., oak twig girdlers."
