= Phryganidia naxa =

Scientific classification
- Kingdom: Animalia
- Phylum: Arthropoda
- Clade: Pancrustacea
- Class: Insecta
- Order: Lepidoptera
- Superfamily: Noctuoidea
- Family: Notodontidae
- Genus: Phryganidia
- Species: P. naxa

Binomial name
- Phryganidia naxa (H. Druce, 1887)

Synonyms
- Typhonia naxa H. Druce, 1885; Josia brevifascia Prout, 1918; Phryganidia fasciata Hering, 1928; Tithraustes watsoni Beutelspacher, 1986

Species of moth

Phryganidia naxa is a moth of the family Notodontidae first described by Herbert Druce in 1887. It is found in Guatemala and Mexico.

There is a broad wing pattern variation in adults.

The larvae are important defoliators of Quercus species in the state of Querétaro, Mexico.
