= Dryocosmus jungalii =

Scientific classification
- Kingdom: Animalia
- Phylum: Arthropoda
- Class: Insecta
- Order: Hymenoptera
- Family: Cynipidae
- Genus: Dryocosmus
- Species: D. jungalii

Binomial name
- Dryocosmus jungalii Melika and Stone, 2010

Species of wasp

Dryocosmus jungalii is a gall wasp species in the family Cynipidae whose life cycle involves only Palaearctic oaks, Quercus subgen. Quercus, in the section Cerris.
