= Phryganidia chihuahua =

Scientific classification
- Kingdom: Animalia
- Phylum: Arthropoda
- Clade: Pancrustacea
- Class: Insecta
- Order: Lepidoptera
- Superfamily: Noctuoidea
- Family: Notodontidae
- Genus: Phryganidia
- Species: P. chihuahua

Binomial name
- Phryganidia chihuahua Miller, 1987

Species of moth

Phryganidia chihuahua is a moth of the family Notodontidae. It is found in Mexico.
