= Aphelonyx kordestanica =

Scientific classification
- Kingdom: Animalia
- Phylum: Arthropoda
- Class: Insecta
- Order: Hymenoptera
- Family: Cynipidae
- Genus: Aphelonyx
- Species: A. kordestanica

Binomial name
- Aphelonyx kordestanica Melika, 2010

Species of wasp

Aphelonyx kordestanica is a gall wasp species in the family Cynipidae whose life cycle involves only Palaearctic oaks, Quercus subgen. Quercus, in the section Cerris.
