= Chrysolepis chrysophylla =

- Chrysolepis chrysophylla

Conservation status
- Secure (NatureServe)

- Least Concern (IUCN 3.1)

Scientific classification
- Kingdom: Plantae
- Clade: Tracheophytes
- Clade: Angiosperms
- Clade: Eudicots
- Clade: Rosids
- Order: Fagales
- Family: Fagaceae
- Genus: Chrysolepis
- Species: C. chrysophylla

Binomial name
- Chrysolepis chrysophylla (Douglas ex Hook.) Hjelmq.
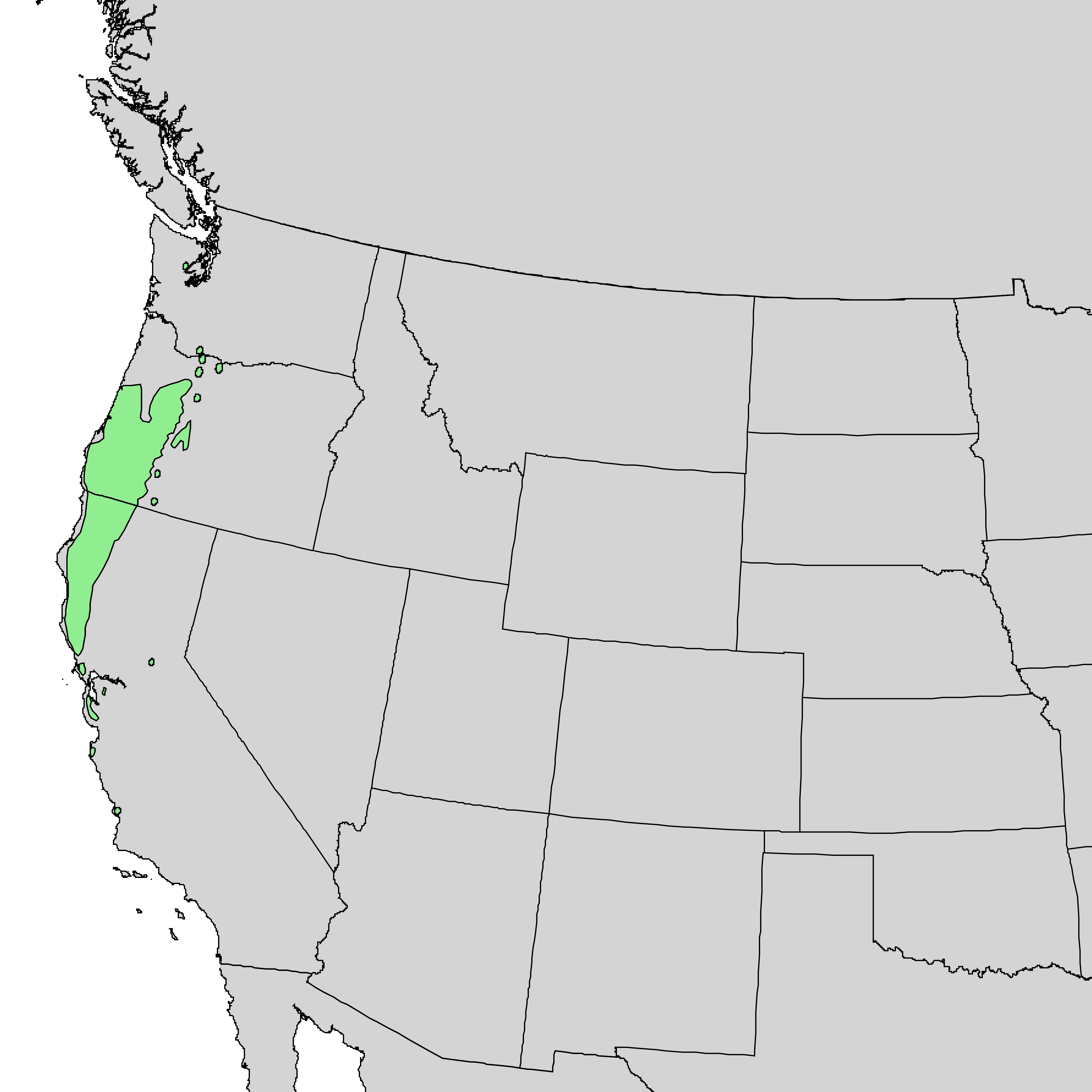
- Natural range of Chrysolepis chrysophylla

Synonyms
- Castanea chrysophylla Douglas ex Hook.; Castanopsis chrysophylla (Douglas ex Hook.) A.DC.

Species of flowering plant

Chrysolepis chrysophylla, commonly known as golden chinquapin or giant chinquapin (also spelled chinkapin), is a species of evergreen shrub or tree in the beech family. It is native to California, Oregon and Washington. The species has dark green leathery leaves, with distinct golden-yellow fuzzy undersides and produces small nuts which are protected by conspicuous spiny burs. It may become a large tree on favorable sites, but often remains small and shrubby on exposed, rocky, dry or high elevation places.

== Taxonomy ==
The leaves' distinct golden undersides

Chrysolepis chrysophylla is one of two species in the genus Chrysolepis, which is restricted to the western United States. The other species, Chrysolepis sempervirens, is generally a low, spreading montane shrub. The common name "chinquapin" also applies to members of the genera Castanea (chestnuts) and Castanopsis (chinquapins), and thus does not refer to a single taxonomic group. The genus name "Chrysolepis" comes from Greek chrysos (gold) and lepis (scale), while the species name "chrysophylla" also comes from Greek and means "golden-leaved".

The species was originally published as Castanea chrysophylla by William Jackson Hooker using a name attributed to David Douglas in 1838. It was transferred to Castanopsis by Alphonse de Candolle in 1863, Hjelmqvist established the genus Chrysolepis and moved this species into it in 1948. The two Chrysolepis species were formerly included in Castanopsis, but differ in cupule structures: distinct valves enclose the nuts and internal walls separate adjacent nuts within the spiny cupules.

Molecular studies also support Chrysolepis as a distinct genus rather than part of Castanopsis. A 2008 analysis of the nuclear gene CRABS CLAW placed Chrysolepis closest to the Asian stone oaks (Lithocarpus) and suggested their unusual fruiting structures may have shared evolutionary origins. A 2022 study placed Chrysolepis in a clade containing Lithocarpus and western North American tanoaks, Notholithocarpus, together being the sister to Quercus.

== Description ==
The giant chinquapin is an evergreen tree or erect shrub. Trees are generally 5 to 30 m (16 to 98 ft) tall, although exceptionally large specimens may reach 45 m (148 ft) and 1.5 m (4.9 ft) in trunk diameter. Shrubby forms are more common on exposed, dry or high elevation sites, while tree forms occur more often in sheltered, moist locations. Mature trees generally have straight trunks and cone shaped crowns, though trees growing in more open areas may develop broader spreading crowns. Giant chinquapins may live up to 500 years, with trees on drier sites more likely to avoid disease and live longer.

Mature specimen with fruiting clusters on Mount Tam

Mature, furrowed bark

Dark green leaves with distinct golden undersides

The reddish bark is thin and smooth when young, becoming thick, rough and deeply furrowed with age.

The dark green leathery leaves are evergreen, lanceolate to oblong, 5 to 15 cm (2.0 to 5.9 in) long, with mostly smooth margins. The lower leaf surface is covered in distinctly golden yellow or brownish fuzz. The leaf blade may be flat or folded upward along the midrib. Individual leaves remain on the plant for about three years.

The species is monoecious, with individuals bearing both male and female flowers. White male flowers are catkins, while groups of up to three female flowers occur at the base of a male catkin or on separate short catkins and emit a strong, musty odor. A spiny 4-valved bur contains one to three nuts, each about 1 cm in diameter. The nuts reach maturity in the second year after pollination.

The species may resemble tanoak, but encloses its fruit in chestnut-like spiny burs rather than bearing acorns in open cups.

C. chrysophylla catkins in October

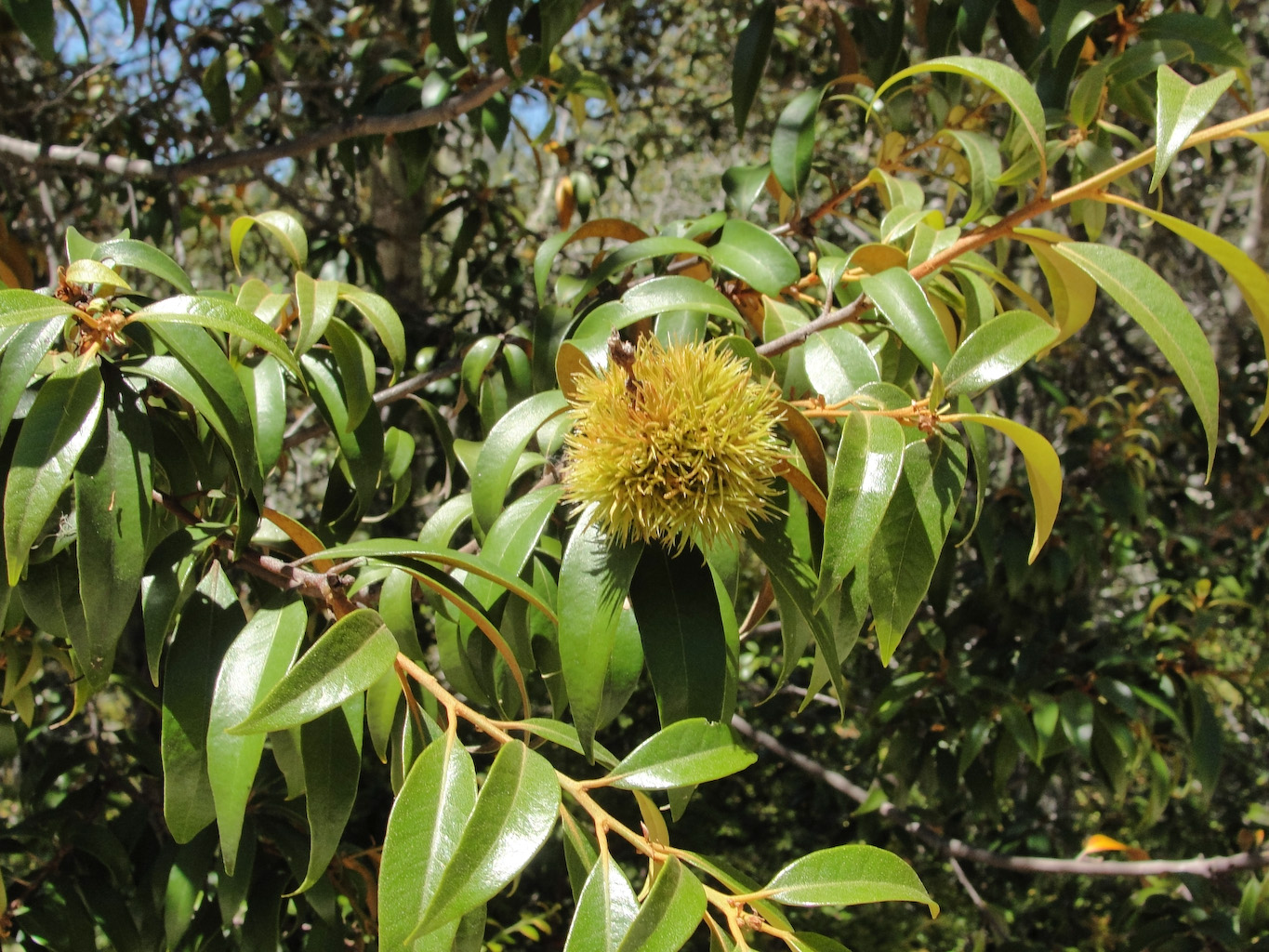
Leaves and developing fruits

Mature spiny fruits

== Distribution and habitat ==
Shrubby specimen growing at a forest-chaparral edge on Mt Tam

Chrysolepis chrysophylla is endemic to the Pacific coast of the United States, growing from extreme southern Washington through western Oregon, south to west-central California, with a disjunct population documented in El Dorado county. It grows in climax forests dominated by redwood, white fir, western hemlock, and Shasta red fir, or mixes of tree types. It may be an understory shrub, or it may codominate the canopy as a tree. Habitat types where the tree may be found include coastal forests, woodlands, and chaparral. In the western Cascade Mountains it grows in western hemlock forests. In the southern Cascades it grows at higher elevations but takes on a smaller, shrubbier form. It can be found growing up to 1,800 m (5,900 ft) above sea level.

== Ecology ==
The giant chinquapin occurs in forests of all successional stages, from recently burned stands to undisturbed forests over 500 years old. It has been called a " persistent subclimax species": it has wide ecological adaptability: it comes in tree and shrub form, is tolerant of shade, yet needs disturbance such as fire for sprouts from the root crown to become established, while rarely fully dominating the canopy. Assessments of its shade tolerance vary: different studies classify the species as tolerant, intermediate tolerance or intolerant of shade. Tree forms of this plant have been classified as shade intolerant, while shrub forms have been classified as shade-tolerant. Although tolerant to a degree of shade, it has been observed that on some open sites, the species has better growth, more individual specimens and increased sexual reproduction.

Vegetative generation after a fire at Henry Cowell Redwoods State Park.

This species is generally wind-pollinated, but bees visit the flowers and may pollinate them. The giant chinquapin reproduces both by seed and vegetatively. Mast production is generally low, occurring in 2-5 year cycles, and it takes two years for fruit to mature on the tree. The germination rate of the seed is low, but may be immediately germinable once fallen from the tree. The seeds are dispersed by gravity, birds and squirrels. The seeds are sometimes cached by squirrels. Seedling establishment is most common on mesic, cool, partially shaded sites that do not have too much dense vegetation.

Giant chinquapins also regenerate vegetatively, especially after environmental disturbance such as fire. Although the species is often top-killed or killed by fire, it often resprouts. The sprouts may grow from the root crown, burl or roots and typically grow much faster than specimens grown from seed. Vegetative regeneration was the main form of reproduction on dry upper slopes, where conditions make it more difficult for seedlings to be established. More frequent burns and increased fire severity may negatively impact giant chinquapin survival and recovery.

=== Associations with animals ===
The nuts are eaten by birds, small mammals such as chipmunks and squirrels, and insects. This species provides cover for small birds and medium-to-small mammals including pine siskins, red breasted nuthatches, flycatchers, northern goshawks, pileated woodpeckers, spotted owls, red tree voles and pacific shrews, fishers and martens.

The gall wasp genus Chrysolepicynips consists of four species that induce galls on Chrysolepis. These galls are abnormal growths of plant tissue in which the wasp larvae develop. One species, Chrysolepicynips demartinii, is only known to induce galls on C. chrysophylla buds, whereas the three others use both C. chrysophylla and C. sempervirens as hosts, inducing galls in the plant buds, leaves, nuts, and inflorescences.

Examples of Chrysolepicynips galls on Chrysolepis chrysophylla
C. rileypokei gall on buds

C. castanopsidis galls on inflorescences

C. juliae gall on a leaf

Two species of scale insects in the family Kermesidae feed on the plant's sap and can be mistaken for galls: Allokermes rattani (also known to feed on C. sempervirens and Quercus douglasii) and Kermes nudus (which also feeds on C. sempervirens). The larvae of the beetle Phymatodes aeneus bore into the plant's dying branches. Larvae of the California oakworm moth (Phryganidia californica) feed on the plant's foliage and can defoliate plants enough to reduce growth. A more significant pest is the filbertworm moth (Cydia latiferreana), which infests the nuts, thereby reducing the plant's ability to reproduce: studies in the H.J. Andrews Experimental Forest found that between 15% and 100% of fruit across three populations were destroyed by the moth. Another lepidopteran, the golden hairstreak (Habrodais grunus), uses C. chrysophylla as a host plant for its larvae; in Washington, where the hairstreak is considered a species of greatest conservation need, C. chrysophylla serves as the only host plant, and butterflies much of their lives in the plant's canopy.

=== Associations with fungi and other organisms ===
Fungal pathogens root rot, rarely have significant effects on Chrysolepis chrysophylla. Nevertheless, infection by leaf fungi is fairly common, and several species of ascomycetes have been isolated from necrotic leaves. Heart rot, a disease caused by fungi including Phellinus decaying the heartwood of trees, is common and has been identified as the main cause of death of mature trees at undisturbed sites. Trees growing in wetter sites or that have injured stems are more susceptible to heart rot. Despite being closely related to chestnuts, C. chrysophylla is resistant to chestnut blight.

C. chrysophylla forms symbiotic relationships with soil fungi through its roots, called ectomycorrhizal associations. A 2015 study found that C. chrysophylla shared most of its fungal partners with conifers in the Pringle Falls Experimental Forest in Central Oregon. The author proposed that C. chrysophylla, which regenerates quickly, may play an important role in maintaining the forest's ectomycorrhizal fungal diversity through fire and other disturbance events.

== Uses ==
The tree has a heavy, strong wood which is light brown with a pinkish tinge. It rarely grows in large enough quantities to serve commercial purposes and is one of the most difficult hardwoods in North America to cure. Nevertheless, the wood is sometimes used to make furniture, paneling, and veneer.

The nut is edible, having a flavor similar to the hazelnut/filbert. The nuts were consumed by Native Americans, and the Paiute people also used the leaves to make tea.
