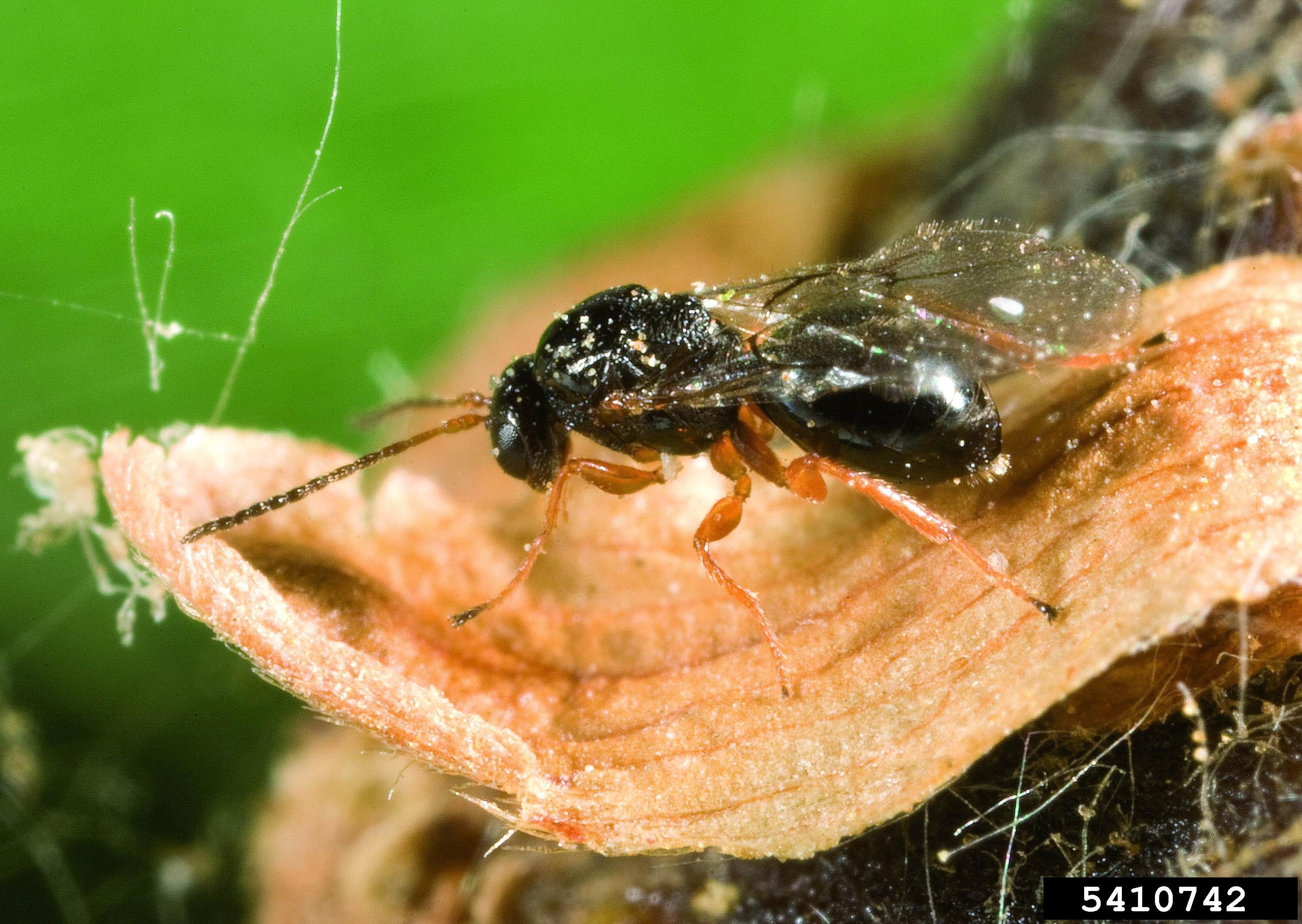
- Dryocosmus kuriphilus

Scientific classification
- Kingdom: Animalia
- Phylum: Arthropoda
- Clade: Pancrustacea
- Class: Insecta
- Order: Hymenoptera
- Family: Cynipidae
- Tribe: Cynipini
- Genus: Dryocosmus; Giraud, 1859

Type species
- Dryocosmus cerriphilus Giraud, 1859

Synonyms
- 'Chilaspis' Mayr, 1881

= Dryocosmus =

Genus of wasps

Dryocosmus are a genus of gall wasps. They are cyclically parthenogenetic insects that induce galls on plants in the family Fagaceae.

According to recent studies, the genus includes some species previously considered as belonging to the genus Chilaspis, whereas Dryocosmus favus should be excluded of the genus. Dryocosmus and Chilaspis are closely related to the other oak gall wasp taxa (Aphelonyx, Plagiotrochus, Pseudoneuroterus, Trichagalma, and some Neuroterus species)

Dryocosmus kuriphilus is an invasive species in Europe and North America (originating from Asia) that endangers the chestnut trees.

== Species ==
- Dryocosmus albidus Weld, 1944
- Dryocosmus archboldi Melika & Abrahamson, 2021
- Dryocosmus cannoni Schwéger & Tang, 2016
- Dryocosmus archboldi Melika & Abrahamson, 2021
- Dryocosmus caputgrusi Tang & Schwéger, 2016
- Dryocosmus carlesiae Tang & Melika, 2011
- Dryocosmus caspiensis Melika, Sadeghi, Atkinson, Stone & Barimani, 2008
- Dryocosmus cerriphilus Giraud, 1859
- Dryocosmus crinitus Schwéger & Tang, 2016
- Dryocosmus destefanii Cerasa & Melika, 2018
- Dryocosmus dubiosus Fullaway, 1911 (two-horned gall wasp)
- Dryocosmus favus Beutenmüller, 1911
- Dryocosmus floridensis (Beutenmüller, 1917)
- Dryocosmus gigas (possibly in Andricus or Feron)
- Dryocosmus harrisonae Melika & Tang, 2016
- Dryocosmus hearni Melika & Tang, 2016
- Dryocosmus hualieni Schwéger & Tang, 2016
- Dryocosmus israeli (Sternlicht, 1968)
- Dryocosmus jungalii Melika & Stone, 2010
- Dryocosmus konradi Tang & Melika, 2016
- Dryocosmus kuriphilus Yasumatsu, 1951
- Dryocosmus liui Pang, Su & Zhu, 2018
- Dryocosmus liyingi Melika & Tang, 2016
- Dryocosmus mayri (Müllner, 1901)
- Dryocosmus mikoi Melika, Tavakoli, Stone & Azizkhani, 2006
- Dryocosmus minusculus Weld, 1952 (pumpkin gall wasp)
- Dryocosmus moriius Tang & Melika, 2016
- Dryocosmus nitidus (Giraud, 1859)
- Dryocosmus pentagonalis Melika & Tang, 2011
- Dryocosmus quadripetiolus Schwéger & Tang, 2016
- Dryocosmus quercuspalustris (Osten Sacken, 1861) (succulent oak gall wasp)
- Dryocosmus rugosus Kieffer, 1899
- Dryocosmus salicinai Schwéger & Tang, 2016
- Dryocosmus taitungensis Tang & Melika, 2016
- Dryocosmus testisimilis Tang & Melika, 2011
- Dryocosmus triangularis Melika & Tang, 2011
- Dryocosmus zhuili Liu & Zhu, 2015
