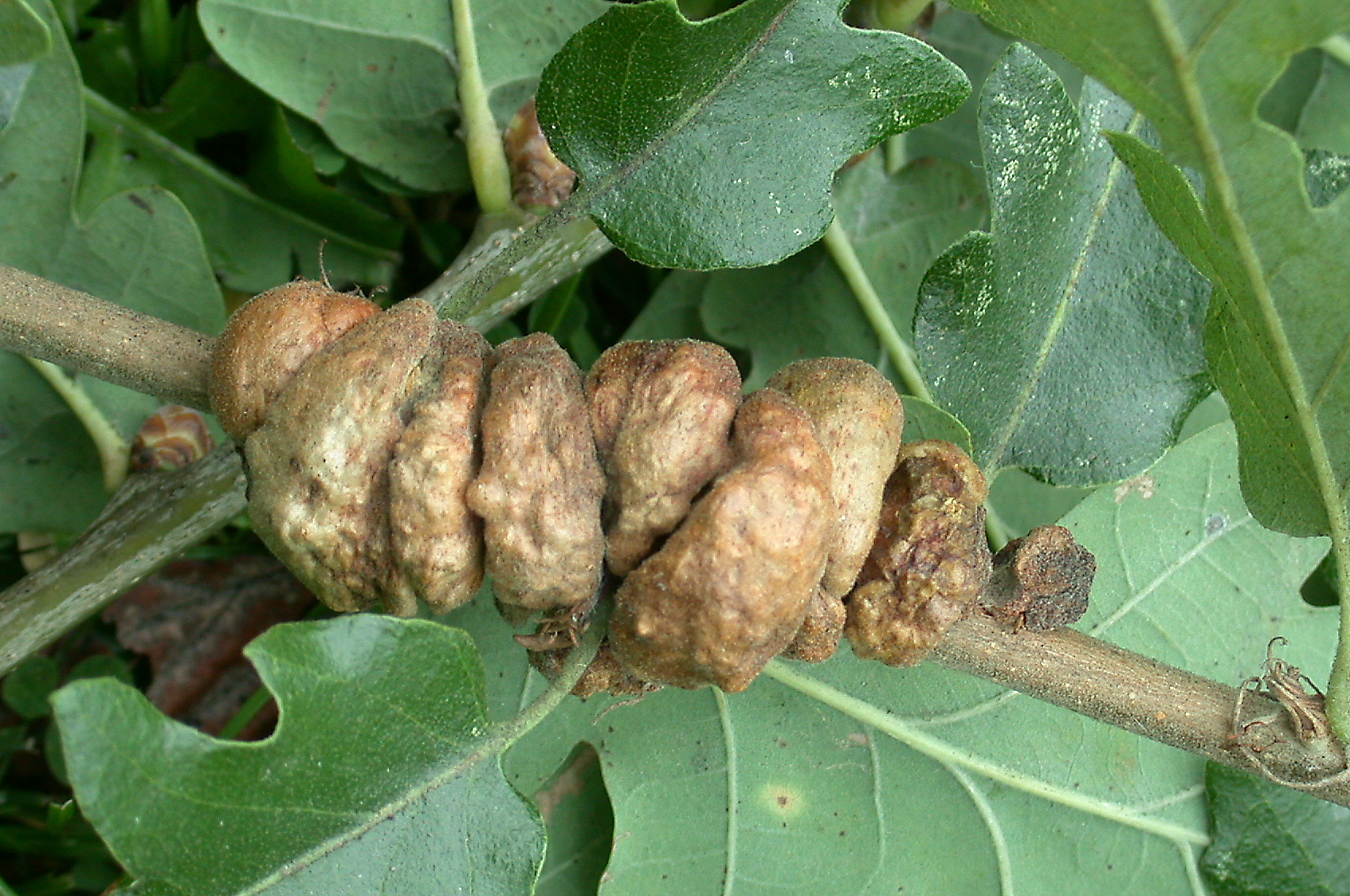
- Mature gall on turkey oak

Scientific classification
- Kingdom: Animalia
- Phylum: Arthropoda
- Class: Insecta
- Order: Hymenoptera
- Family: Cynipidae
- Genus: Aphelonyx
- Species: A. cerricola

Binomial name
- Aphelonyx cerricola Giraud, 1859

= Aphelonyx cerricola =

Species of gall wasp

Aphelonyx cerricola is a gall wasp species in the family Cynipidae which is native to Europe and Western Asia from Austria to Iran, and is an introduced species in Great Britain. Only the asexual generation is known, which induces galls on Quercus cerris within Europe with possible records on other species within Quercus section Cerris in Iran.
