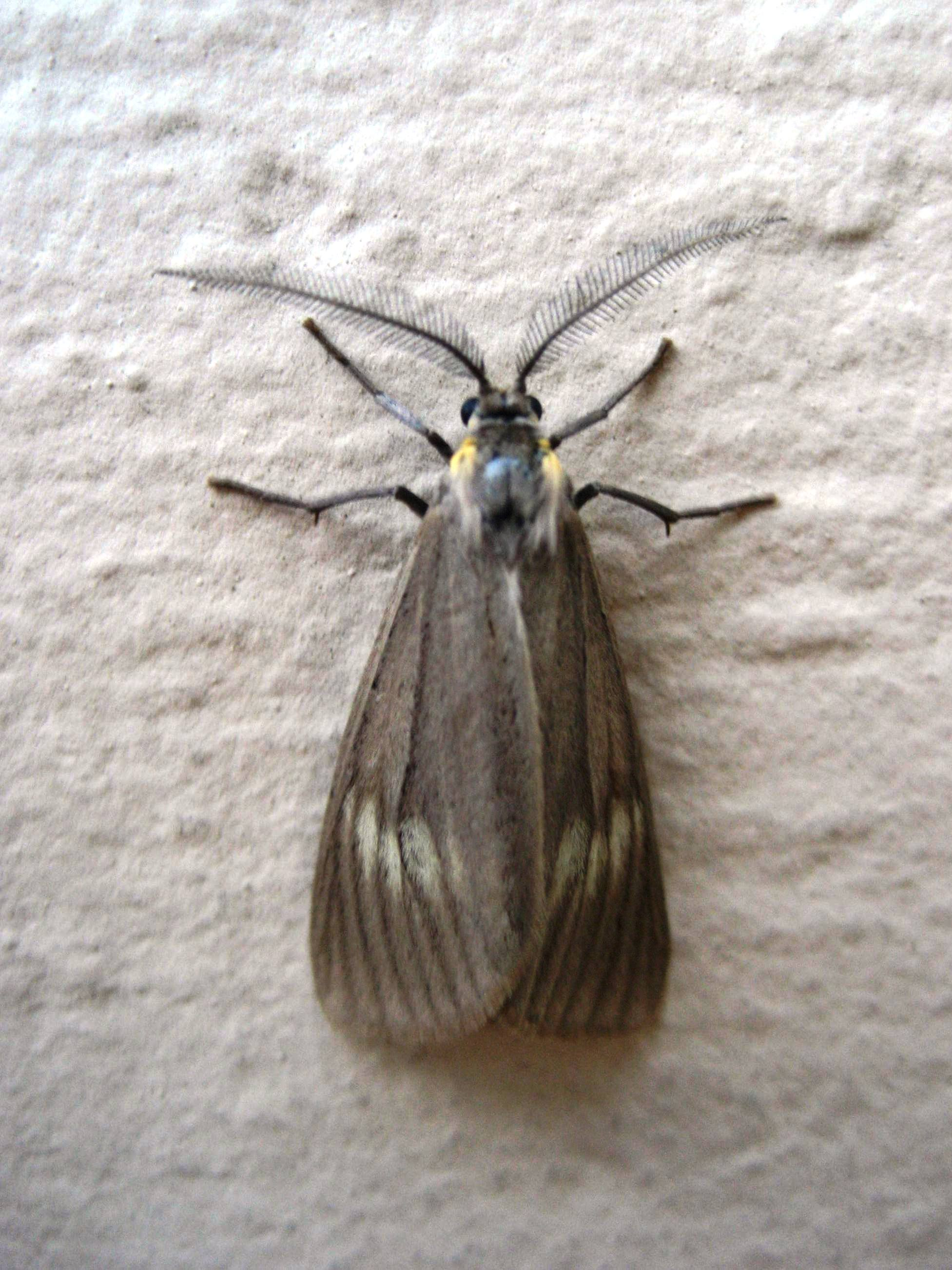

Scientific classification
- Kingdom: Animalia
- Phylum: Arthropoda
- Clade: Pancrustacea
- Class: Insecta
- Order: Lepidoptera
- Superfamily: Noctuoidea
- Family: Notodontidae
- Genus: Phryganidia
- Species: P. californica

Binomial name
- Phryganidia californica Packard, 1864

= Phryganidia californica =

Species of moth

Phryganidia californica, the California oakworm or California oak moth, is a moth of the family Notodontidae and subfamily Dioptinae. The species was first described by Alpheus Spring Packard in 1864. It is found along the coasts of the US states of California and Oregon, and Washington. The California oak moth is the only member of its subfamily to be found north of Mexico.

The wingspan is about 30 mm (1.2 in). They are tan to gray moths with prominent wing veins. Adults are on wing from March to November. There are two generations per year in northern California. Sometimes there is a third generation in southern California.

The larvae are black with lengthwise yellow stripes. Full-grown larvae are about 30 mm (1.2 in) long. Pupation takes place in a white or yellow pupa with black markings.

The larvae feed on the leaves of deciduous oaks, especially Quercus agrifolia (coast live oak). Young larvae feed between veins on the lower leaf surface. Although the upper leaf surface is left intact, it dries out and turns brown. Larvae in later instars chew completely through the leaf blade, often leaving only major leaf veins. Small frass pellets drop from the canopy as larvae feed. In outbreak years, individual trees or groups of trees may be almost entirely defoliated, typically by late summer or early fall. Trees are consumed based on where a female moth lays her eggs, however the defensive chemistry of oaks themselves may be a factor. This chemistry may also protect larvae from diurnal predators: while many non-toxic moths and caterpillars feed at night, California oak moths and their larvae can be seen safely feeding during the day.

California oak moth larvae utilize silk threads in order to reach the ground or, alternatively, another oak tree. If the larvae lands on another oak tree, it will continue feeding until ready to pupate. Upon landing on the ground, the larvae will find a suitable location to pupate. This location can range from the sides of trees, rocks, buildings, or other manmade objects.

== Life stages ==
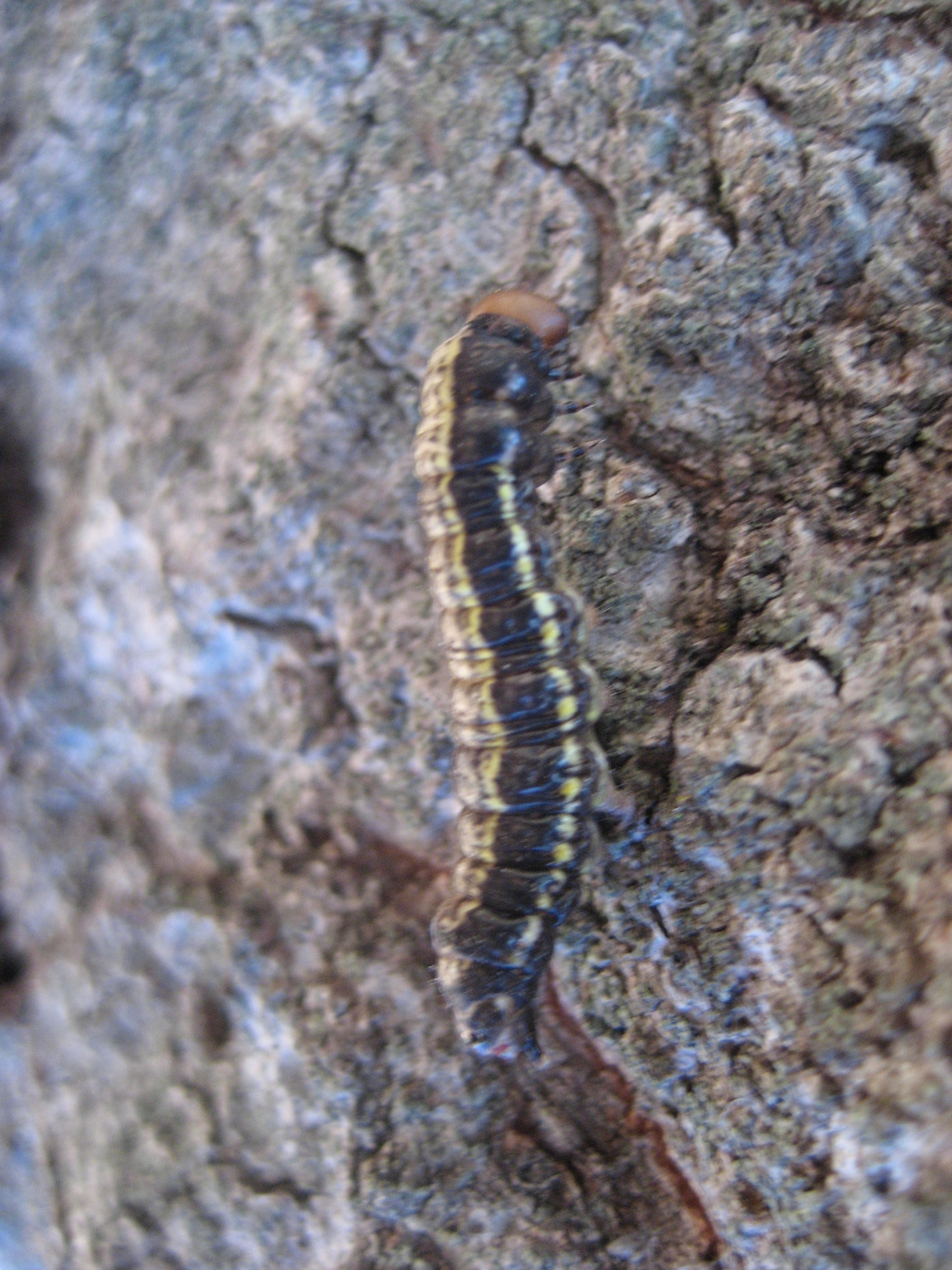
Larva

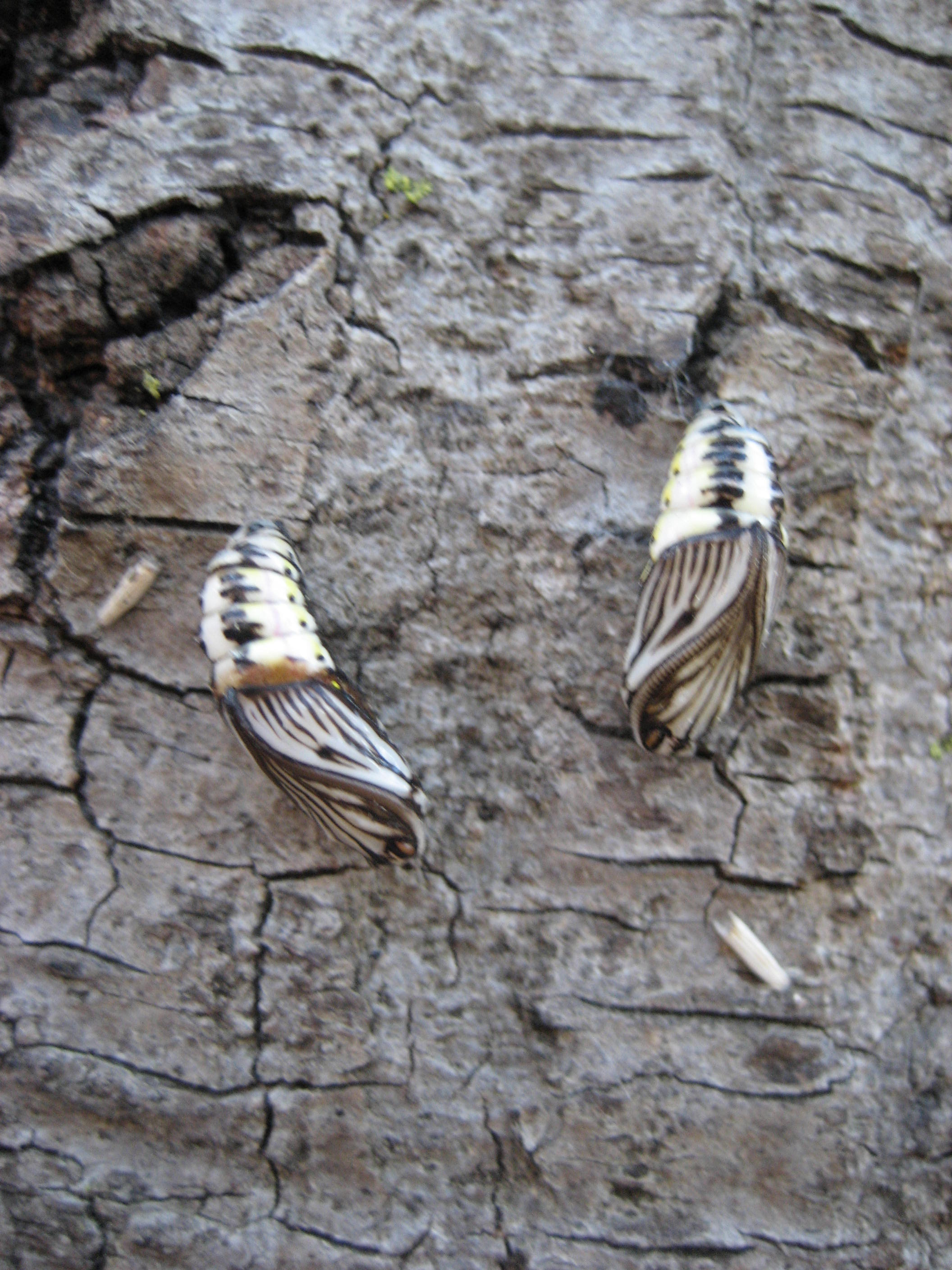
Pupa

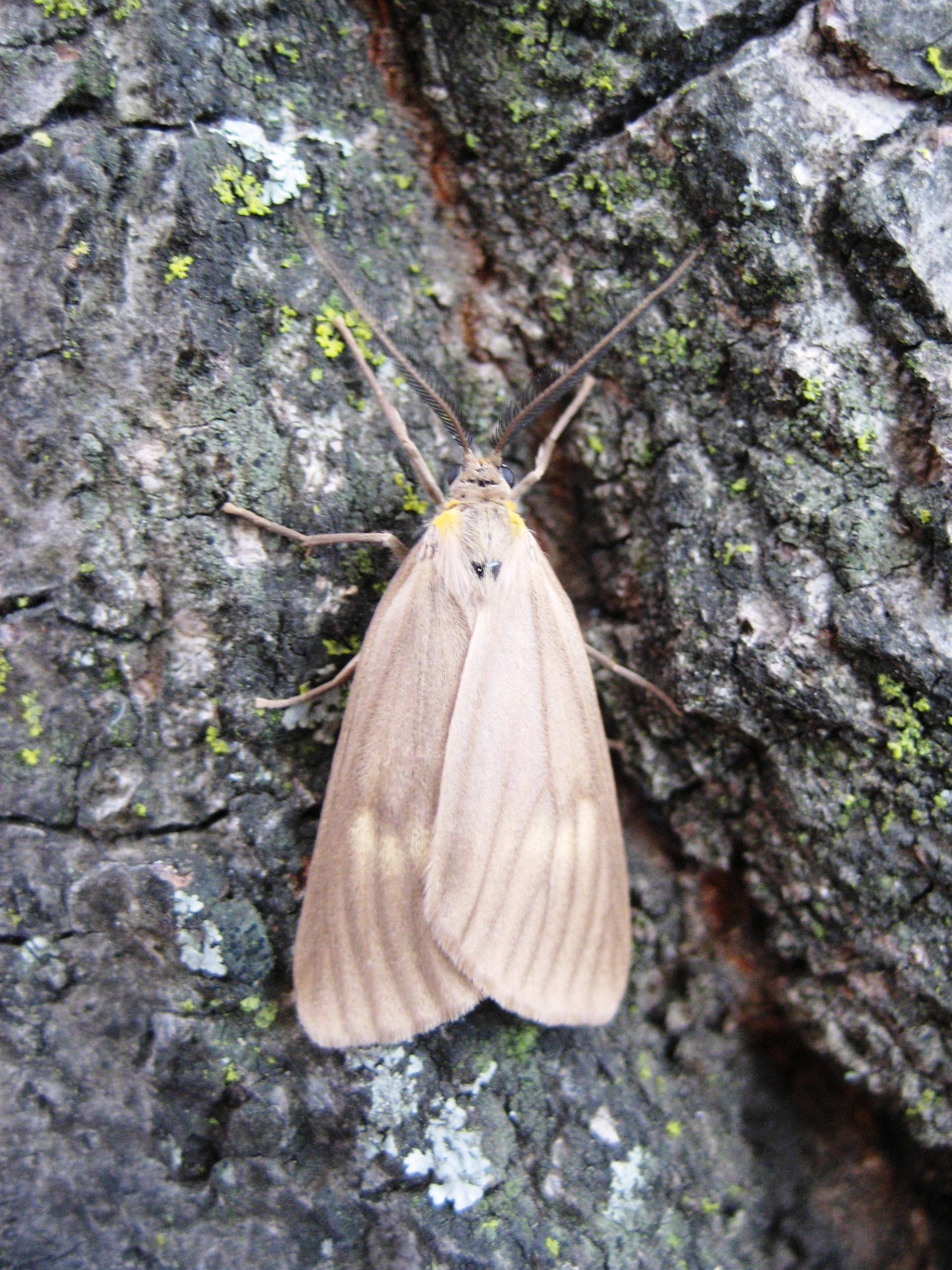
Adult
