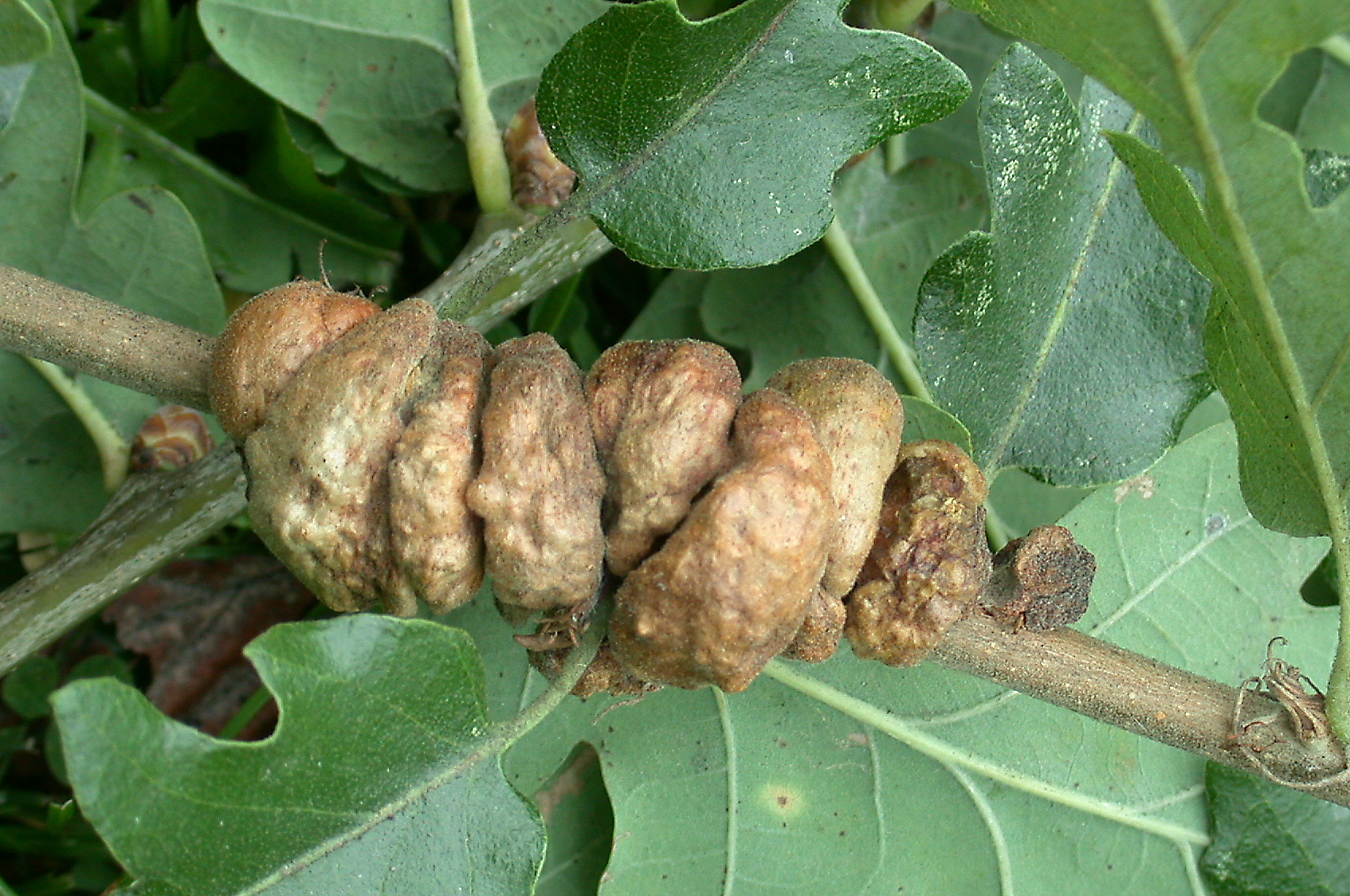
- Galls of Aphelonyx cerricola growing on a branch of Quercus cerris

Scientific classification
- Kingdom: Animalia
- Phylum: Arthropoda
- Class: Insecta
- Order: Hymenoptera
- Family: Cynipidae
- Tribe: Cynipini
- Genus: Aphelonyx; Mayr, 1881

Type species
- Cynips cerricola Giraud, 1859

= Aphelonyx =

Genus of wasps

Aphelonyx is a genus of oak gall wasps in the family Cynipidae, comprising three known species:

- Aphelonyx cerricola (Giraud, 1859)
- Aphelonyx kordestanica Melika, 2010
- Aphelonyx persica Melika, Stone, Sadeghi & Pujade-Villar, 2004
