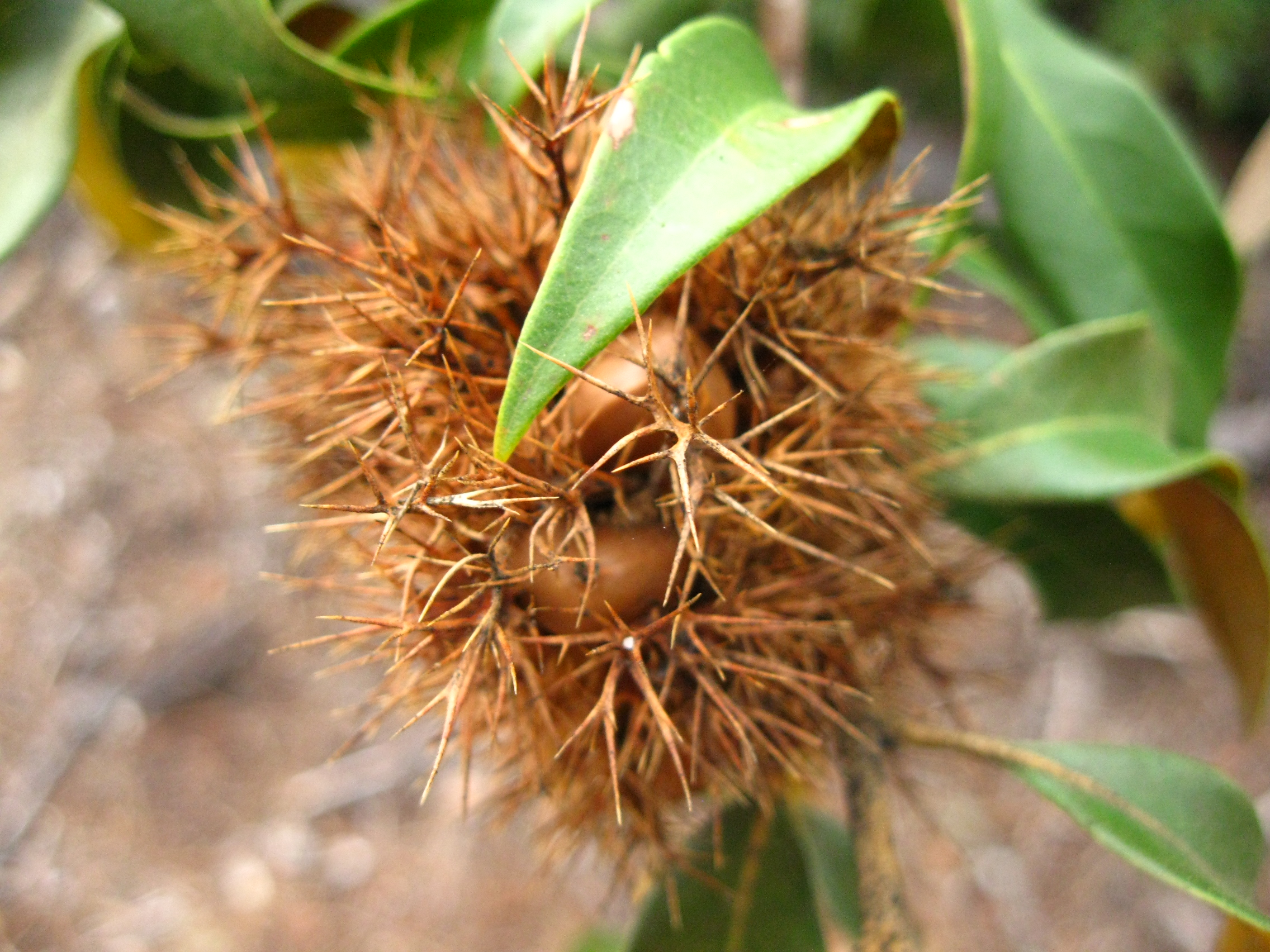

Scientific classification
- Kingdom: Plantae
- Clade: Tracheophytes
- Clade: Angiosperms
- Clade: Eudicots
- Clade: Rosids
- Order: Fagales
- Family: Fagaceae
- Subfamily: Quercoideae
- Genus: Chrysolepis; Hjelmq.

Species
- Chrysolepis chrysophylla; Chrysolepis sempervirens

= Chrysolepis =

Genus of flowering plants

Chrysolepis is a small genus of plants in the family Fagaceae, endemic to the western United States. Its two species have the common name chinquapin. The genus occurs from western Washington south to the Transverse Ranges in Southern California, and east into Nevada.

== Description ==
Chrysolepis are evergreen trees and shrubs with simple, entire (untoothed) leaves with a dense layer of golden scales on the underside and a thinner layer on the upper side; the leaves persist for 3–4 years before falling.

The fruit is a densely spiny cupule containing 1–3 sweet, edible nuts, eaten by the indigenous peoples. The fruit also provides food for chipmunks and squirrels.

Chrysolepis is related to the subtropical southeast Asian genus Castanopsis (in which it was formerly included), but differs in the nuts being triangular and fully enclosed in a sectioned cupule, and in having bisexual catkins. Chrysolepis also differs from another allied genus Castanea (chestnuts), in nuts that take 14–16 months to mature (3–5 months in Castanea), evergreen leaves and the shoots having a terminal bud.

=== Species ===
There are two species of Chrysolepis — Chrysolepis chrysophylla and Chrysolepis sempervirens — which like many species in the related genera of Castanopsis and Castanea are called chinquapin, also spelled "chinkapin".

Image	Name	Common name	Description	Distribution
	Chrysolepis chrysophylla	golden chinquapin or giant chinquapin	A tree reaching 20–40 metres (66–131 ft) tall, or sometimes a shrub 3–10 metres (9.8–32.8 ft) tall. Chrysolepis chrysophylla grows at lower elevations than C. sempervirens, from sea level to 1,500 metres (4,900 ft), rarely 2,000 metres (6,600 ft). The leaves are 6–12 centimetres (2.4–4.7 in) long, with an acute (sharp-pointed) apex. The bark is thick and rough.	It occurs in coastal areas of the Pacific Coast Ranges from Washington near Seattle south to the San Luis Obispo area California Coast Ranges. There is also a small disjunct population distribution in the northern Sierra Nevada east of the Sacramento Valley
	Chrysolepis sempervirens	bush chinquapin	A shrub only 1–2 metres (3.3–6.6 ft) tall. Chrysolepis sempervirens grows mostly at high elevation, 1,000–3,000 metres (3,300–9,800 ft) altitude. The leaves are smaller, 4–8 centimetres (1.6–3.1 in) long, with an obtuse (blunt-pointed or rounded) apex. The bark is thin and smooth.	It occurs in interior southwest Oregon and California, in the Klamath Mountains, the full Sierra Nevada range, and the San Gabriel, San Bernardino, and San Jacinto Mountains of the Southern California Transverse Ranges.
