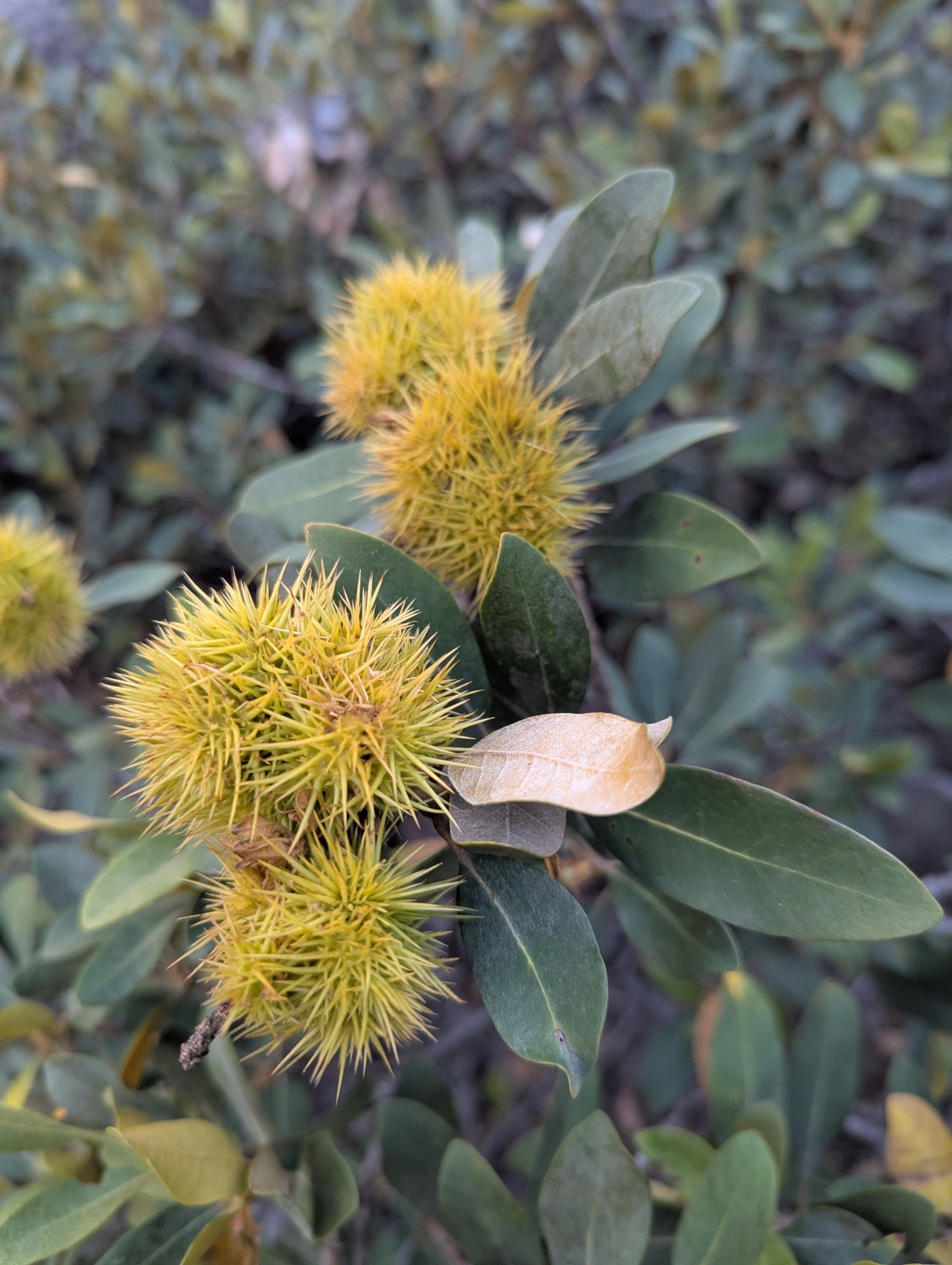

Conservation status
- Apparently Secure (NatureServe)

Scientific classification
- Kingdom: Plantae
- Clade: Embryophytes
- Clade: Tracheophytes
- Clade: Spermatophytes
- Clade: Angiosperms
- Clade: Eudicots
- Clade: Rosids
- Order: Fagales
- Family: Fagaceae
- Genus: Chrysolepis
- Species: C. sempervirens

Binomial name
- Chrysolepis sempervirens (Kell.) Hjelmqv
- Natural range of Chrysolepis sempervirens, estimated with iNaturalist Geomodel

Synonyms
- Castanopsis sempervirens (Kellogg) Dudley

= Chrysolepis sempervirens =

Species of flowering plant

Chrysolepis sempervirens is a species of mountain shrub in the oak family known by the common names bush chinkapin, bush golden chinquapin, or Sierra evergreen chinquapin. It is native to the western United States, where it grows on rocky slopes and chaparral throughout the San Gabriel, San Jacinto, Sierra Nevada, Cascade, and Klamath Ranges of California and Southern Oregon.

== Description ==
Chrysolepis sempervirens grows as a shrub, typically shorter than 3 meters high. The bark is gray or brown in color and smooth. In July and August, the shrub produces a green catkin, or spike-like inflorescence, which fruits as a yellowish bur, 20-60 mm thick, densely spiny, and containing one to three light brown nuts. The abaxial side of the young leaf is golden, while the adaxial side is green, and the evergreen leaves remain on the plant throughout the year. Rounded leaf tips distinguish C. sempervirens from C. chrysophylla, the only other species in this genus, which grows in more coastal habitats. There are no subspecies or varieties of C. sempervirens.

== Ecology ==
Chrysolepis sempervirens is generally more shade-tolerant than C. chrysophylla, and can therefore grow in the lower strata of coniferous forests. The shrub is pollinated by the wind, and its fruit ripens in the second year of development. The nuts are a good source of food for birds and rodents, which help to further disseminate the seeds.

== Uses ==
The nuts are edible, though small, and taste similar to hazelnut. Indigenous peoples of California gathered and roasted them as a food source. Today the species is occasionally grown as an ornamental shrub in native plant gardens, valued for its dense form, attractive foliage, and adaptation to dry, rocky sites.
