= Norape plumosa =

Scientific classification
- Kingdom: Animalia
- Phylum: Arthropoda
- Clade: Pancrustacea
- Class: Insecta
- Order: Lepidoptera
- Family: Megalopygidae
- Genus: Norape
- Species: N. plumosa

Binomial name
- Norape plumosa (Butler, 1877)

Synonyms
- Carama plumosa Butler, 1877

Species of moth

Norape plumosa is a moth of the Megalopygidae family. It was described by Arthur Gardiner Butler in 1877. It is found in Costa Rica, Panama and the Amazon region.

Adults are similar to Norape walkeri.

== Subspecies ==
- Norape plumosa plumosa (Brazil)
- Norape plumosa angustior Hopp, 1927 (Brazil)
- Norape plumosa biacuta Hopp, 1927 (Colombia)
