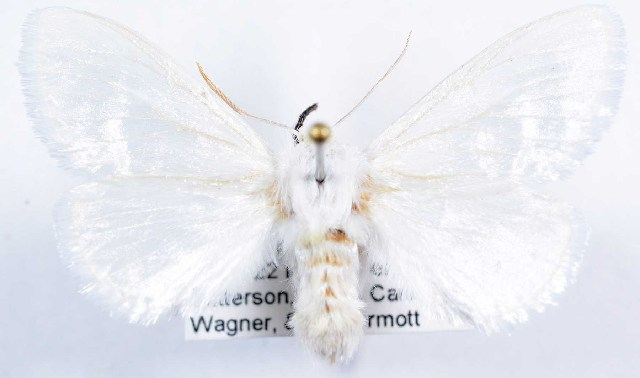

Scientific classification
- Kingdom: Animalia
- Phylum: Arthropoda
- Clade: Pancrustacea
- Class: Insecta
- Order: Lepidoptera
- Family: Megalopygidae
- Genus: Norape
- Species: N. virgo

Binomial name
- Norape virgo (Butler, 1877)

Synonyms
- Carama virgo Butler, 1877; Norape virgo ab. albipes Hopp, 1927

= Norape virgo =

Species of moth

Norape virgo is a moth of the Megalopygidae family. It was described by Arthur Gardiner Butler in 1877. It is found from southern Texas and southern Arizona to Colombia.

Adults are similar to Norape walkeri, but smaller. The forewings are shorter, broader and less glossy.

The larvae feed on legumes.

== Etymology ==
The species name is derived from Latin virgo (meaning virgin) and refers to the all white adult.
