= Mesoscia anguilinea =

Scientific classification
- Kingdom: Animalia
- Phylum: Arthropoda
- Clade: Pancrustacea
- Class: Insecta
- Order: Lepidoptera
- Family: Megalopygidae
- Genus: Mesoscia
- Species: M. anguilinea

Binomial name
- Mesoscia anguilinea Schaus, 1912

Species of moth

Mesoscia anguilinea is a moth of the family Megalopygidae. It was described by William Schaus in 1912.
