= Microrape jasminatus =

Scientific classification
- Kingdom: Animalia
- Phylum: Arthropoda
- Clade: Pancrustacea
- Class: Insecta
- Order: Lepidoptera
- Family: Megalopygidae
- Genus: Microrape
- Species: M. jasminatus

Binomial name
- Microrape jasminatus (Dognin, 1893)

Synonyms
- Archylus jasminatus Dognin, 1893; Microrape tenuis Hopp, 1927; Microrape nigrisparsus Butler, 1878

Species of moth

Microrape jasminatus is a moth of the Megalopygidae family. It was described by Paul Dognin in 1893. It is found in Brazil, Bolivia and Ecuador.
