= Norape muelleri =

Scientific classification
- Kingdom: Animalia
- Phylum: Arthropoda
- Clade: Pancrustacea
- Class: Insecta
- Order: Lepidoptera
- Family: Megalopygidae
- Genus: Norape
- Species: N. muelleri

Binomial name
- Norape muelleri Hopp, 1927

Synonyms
- Norape muelleri f. atripes Hopp, 1927

Species of moth

Norape muelleri is a moth of the family Megalopygidae. It was described by Walter Hopp in 1927. It is found in Mexico and Honduras.
