= Norape undulata =

Scientific classification
- Kingdom: Animalia
- Phylum: Arthropoda
- Clade: Pancrustacea
- Class: Insecta
- Order: Lepidoptera
- Family: Megalopygidae
- Genus: Norape
- Species: N. undulata

Binomial name
- Norape undulata E. D. Jones, 1912

Species of moth

Norape undulata is a moth of the family Megalopygidae. It was described by E. Dukinfield Jones in 1912. It is found in Brazil.

The wingspan is about 27 mm for males and 33 mm for females. The basal third of the costa of the forewings is fuscous and there is a geminate fuscous spot in the end of the cell, as well as a subterminal row of fuscous spots above veins 2-5. An antemedial bar of raised scales is found from the cell to the inner margin and there is a similar medial bar and postmedial band, the latter reaching indistinctly to the costa. The hindwings are pure white.
