= Thoscora brugea =

Scientific classification
- Kingdom: Animalia
- Phylum: Arthropoda
- Clade: Pancrustacea
- Class: Insecta
- Order: Lepidoptera
- Family: Megalopygidae
- Genus: Thoscora
- Species: T. brugea

Binomial name
- Thoscora brugea Schaus, 1904

Species of moth

Thoscora brugea is a moth of the Megalopygidae family. It was described by William Schaus in 1904. It is found in Venezuela.

The wingspan is 40 mm. The head and abdomen are ochreous and the antennae, thorax and anal tuft are greyish brown. The forewings are similar, with the veins darker. The hindwings are more greyish.
