= Mesoscia terminata =

Scientific classification
- Kingdom: Animalia
- Phylum: Arthropoda
- Clade: Pancrustacea
- Class: Insecta
- Order: Lepidoptera
- Family: Megalopygidae
- Genus: Mesoscia
- Species: M. terminata

Binomial name
- Mesoscia terminata Schaus, 1905

Synonyms
- Mesoscia fluxa Schaus, 1910; Mesoscia meroma Druce

Species of moth

Mesoscia terminata is a moth of the family Megalopygidae. It was described by William Schaus in 1905. It is found in Costa Rica and French Guiana.

The wingspan is 27 mm. The forewings are grey, with the costa finely light brown and the apex whitish. The outer margin below vein 7 is broadly light brown, crossed by black veins and fine black streaks between the veins. There is a faint subterminal white shade and a postmedial dentate shade, where the grey and brown meet. The hindwings are black, with the outer margin below the apex creamy white.
