= Macara heinrichi =

Scientific classification
- Kingdom: Animalia
- Phylum: Arthropoda
- Clade: Pancrustacea
- Class: Insecta
- Order: Lepidoptera
- Family: Megalopygidae
- Genus: Macara
- Species: M. heinrichi

Binomial name
- Macara heinrichi Hopp, 1928

Species of moth

Macara heinrichi is a moth of the family Megalopygidae. It was described by Walter Hopp in 1928. It is found in South America.
