= Norape laticosta =

Scientific classification
- Kingdom: Animalia
- Phylum: Arthropoda
- Clade: Pancrustacea
- Class: Insecta
- Order: Lepidoptera
- Family: Megalopygidae
- Genus: Norape
- Species: N. laticosta

Binomial name
- Norape laticosta Dyar, 1910

Synonyms
- Norape eutecta Dyar, 1913

Species of moth

Norape laticosta is a moth of the Megalopygidae family. It was described by Harrison Gray Dyar Jr. in 1910. It is found in Mexico (Guerrero).

The wingspan is about 28 mm. Adults are pure white with the costa of the forewings broadly black above and below. The palpi, orbits, pectus, and all tarsi are black and the antennae are dull red, the shaft partly white-scaled. The head has a little yellow tint.
