= Norape fuscoapicata =

Scientific classification
- Kingdom: Animalia
- Phylum: Arthropoda
- Clade: Pancrustacea
- Class: Insecta
- Order: Lepidoptera
- Family: Megalopygidae
- Genus: Norape
- Species: N. fuscoapicata

Binomial name
- Norape fuscoapicata Dognin, 1924

Species of moth

Norape fuscoapicata is a moth of the Megalopygidae family. It was described by Paul Dognin in 1924.
