= Mesoscia dumilla =

Scientific classification
- Kingdom: Animalia
- Phylum: Arthropoda
- Clade: Pancrustacea
- Class: Insecta
- Order: Lepidoptera
- Family: Megalopygidae
- Genus: Mesoscia
- Species: M. dumilla

Binomial name
- Mesoscia dumilla Dyar, 1913

Species of moth

Mesoscia dumilla is a moth of the Megalopygidae family. It was described by Harrison Gray Dyar Jr. in 1913.
