= Mesoscia procera =

Scientific classification
- Kingdom: Animalia
- Phylum: Arthropoda
- Clade: Pancrustacea
- Class: Insecta
- Order: Lepidoptera
- Family: Megalopygidae
- Genus: Mesoscia
- Species: M. procera

Binomial name
- Mesoscia procera Hopp, 1930

Species of moth

Mesoscia procera is a moth of the family Megalopygidae. It was described by Walter Hopp in 1930. It is found in Amazonas, Brazil.
