= Norapella rhadina =

Scientific classification
- Kingdom: Animalia
- Phylum: Arthropoda
- Clade: Pancrustacea
- Class: Insecta
- Order: Lepidoptera
- Family: Megalopygidae
- Genus: Norapella
- Species: N. rhadina

Binomial name
- Norapella rhadina Dognin, 1914

Species of moth

Norapella rhadina is a moth of the Megalopygidae family. It was described by Paul Dognin in 1914.
