= Norape albilineata =

Scientific classification
- Kingdom: Animalia
- Phylum: Arthropoda
- Clade: Pancrustacea
- Class: Insecta
- Order: Lepidoptera
- Family: Megalopygidae
- Genus: Norape
- Species: N. albilineata

Binomial name
- Norape albilineata (Hopp, 1927)

Synonyms
- Mesoscia albilineata Hopp, 1927

Species of moth

Norape albilineata is a moth of the family Megalopygidae. It was described by Walter Hopp in 1927. It is found in Brazil.
