= Norape argyrorrhoea =

Scientific classification
- Kingdom: Animalia
- Phylum: Arthropoda
- Clade: Pancrustacea
- Class: Insecta
- Order: Lepidoptera
- Family: Megalopygidae
- Genus: Norape
- Species: N. argyrorrhoea

Binomial name
- Norape argyrorrhoea Hübner, 1825

Synonyms
- Sulychra argentea Butler, 1878; Carama butleri Baker, 1887; Trosia euthula Dyar, 1910; Norape pruinosa Berg, 1882; Carama pura Butler, 1878

Species of moth

Norape argyrorrhoea is a moth of the Megalopygidae family. It was described by Jacob Hübner in 1825. It is found in Argentina, Trinidad, Brazil, Guyana, Venezuela, Paraguay, Panama, Costa Rica and Mexico.

The wingspan is about 24 mm for males and 30 mm for females. Adults are white, with a faint creamy tint. The pectus and femora are smoky black and the antennae testaceous.
