= Norapella parva =

Scientific classification
- Kingdom: Animalia
- Phylum: Arthropoda
- Clade: Pancrustacea
- Class: Insecta
- Order: Lepidoptera
- Family: Megalopygidae
- Genus: Norapella
- Species: N. parva

Binomial name
- Norapella parva (Schaus, 1896)

Synonyms
- Carama parva Schaus, 1896

Species of moth

Norapella parva is a moth of the Megalopygidae family. It was described by Schaus in 1896. It is found in Brazil.

The wingspan is 30 mm. Adults are entirely pure milky white.
