= Aithorape flammicornis =

Scientific classification
- Kingdom: Animalia
- Phylum: Arthropoda
- Clade: Pancrustacea
- Class: Insecta
- Order: Lepidoptera
- Family: Megalopygidae
- Genus: Aithorape
- Species: A. flammicornis

Binomial name
- Aithorape flammicornis (Schaus, 1905)

Synonyms
- Carama flammicornis Schaus, 1905

Species of moth

Aithorape flammicornis is a species of moth in the family Megalopygidae. It was first described by William Schaus in 1905. It is found in Brazil, Trinidad, Guyana, French Guiana, and Venezuela.

== Description ==
The wingspan is about 27 mm. The body is white and the tarsi, mid- and fore tibiae are black and there is a dark spot on the fore coxae. The frons is dark brown and grey and the antennae are red. The wings are white, with the costa of the forewings finely black.
