= Microrape shilluca =

Scientific classification
- Kingdom: Animalia
- Phylum: Arthropoda
- Clade: Pancrustacea
- Class: Insecta
- Order: Lepidoptera
- Family: Megalopygidae
- Genus: Microrape
- Species: M. shilluca

Binomial name
- Microrape shilluca Schaus, 1929

Species of moth

Microrape shilluca is a moth of the Megalopygidae family. It was described by William Schaus in 1929. It is found in Brazil.

The wingspan is 22 mm. The body is white, and the forelegs light drab. The wings are white, somewhat silvery and rather thinly scaled.
