= Norape venata =

Scientific classification
- Kingdom: Animalia
- Phylum: Arthropoda
- Clade: Pancrustacea
- Class: Insecta
- Order: Lepidoptera
- Family: Megalopygidae
- Genus: Norape
- Species: N. venata

Binomial name
- Norape venata Schaus, 1900

Species of moth

Norape venata is a moth of the family Megalopygidae. It was described by William Schaus in 1900. It is found in Brazil.

The wingspan is about 34 mm. The forewings are white with fine black lines in the cell and between the veins. There are two lines between the median and submedian veins from the base to the outer margin. The hindwings are white. Underneath, the lines on the forewings are heavier and dark brown. The costa is broadly suffused with brown.
