= Mesoscia eriophora =

Scientific classification
- Kingdom: Animalia
- Phylum: Arthropoda
- Clade: Pancrustacea
- Class: Insecta
- Order: Lepidoptera
- Family: Megalopygidae
- Genus: Mesoscia
- Species: M. eriophora

Binomial name
- Mesoscia eriophora (Sepp, 1848)

Species of moth

Mesoscia eriophora is a moth of the Megalopygidae family. It was described by Sepp in 1848.
