= Hysterocladia corallocera =

Scientific classification
- Kingdom: Animalia
- Phylum: Arthropoda
- Clade: Pancrustacea
- Class: Insecta
- Order: Lepidoptera
- Family: Megalopygidae
- Genus: Hysterocladia
- Species: H. corallocera

Binomial name
- Hysterocladia corallocera Felder, 1874

Synonyms
- Trosia ignicornis Schaus, 1905; Hysterocladia ignicornis

Species of moth

Hysterocladia corallocera is a moth of the Megalopygidae family. It was described by Felder in 1874. It is found in Venezuela and French Guiana.

The wingspan is about 21 mm. The body and wings are white and the mid- and fore-legs are mottled with black. The shaft of the antennae is crimson and the pectinations are ochreous.
