= Norapella bipennis =

Scientific classification
- Kingdom: Animalia
- Phylum: Arthropoda
- Clade: Pancrustacea
- Class: Insecta
- Order: Lepidoptera
- Family: Megalopygidae
- Genus: Norapella
- Species: N. bipennis

Binomial name
- Norapella bipennis Hopp, 1930

Species of moth

Norapella bipennis is a moth of the family Megalopygidae. It was described by Walter Hopp in 1930.
