= Macara terena =

Scientific classification
- Kingdom: Animalia
- Phylum: Arthropoda
- Clade: Pancrustacea
- Class: Insecta
- Order: Lepidoptera
- Family: Megalopygidae
- Genus: Macara
- Species: M. terena

Binomial name
- Macara terena (Dognin, 1914)

Synonyms
- Mesoscia terena Dognin, 1914; Mesoscia verditincta Dognin, 1914

Species of moth

Macara terena is a moth of the Megalopygidae family. It was described by Paul Dognin in 1914. It is found in Colombia.
