= Macara argentea =

Scientific classification
- Kingdom: Animalia
- Phylum: Arthropoda
- Clade: Pancrustacea
- Class: Insecta
- Order: Lepidoptera
- Family: Megalopygidae
- Genus: Macara
- Species: M. argentea

Binomial name
- Macara argentea (H. Druce, 1897)

Synonyms
- Carama argentea H. Druce, 1897; Macara argentea Dognin, 1911; Sulychra drucei Hopp, 1927

Species of moth

Macara argentea is a moth of the family Megalopygidae. It was described by Herbert Druce in 1897. It is found in Panama and Ecuador.

The forewings and hindwings are pure white. The forewings crossed from the costal to the inner margin by two broad bands of silvery scales, the outer margin edged with silver.
