= Norape damana =

Scientific classification
- Kingdom: Animalia
- Phylum: Arthropoda
- Clade: Pancrustacea
- Class: Insecta
- Order: Lepidoptera
- Family: Megalopygidae
- Genus: Norape
- Species: N. damana

Binomial name
- Norape damana Hopp, 1930

Species of moth

Norape damana is a moth of the family Megalopygidae. It was described by Walter Hopp in 1930. It is found in Brazil.
