= Norape incolorata =

Scientific classification
- Kingdom: Animalia
- Phylum: Arthropoda
- Clade: Pancrustacea
- Class: Insecta
- Order: Lepidoptera
- Family: Megalopygidae
- Genus: Norape
- Species: N. incolorata

Binomial name
- Norape incolorata (E. D. Jones, 1921)

Species of moth

Norape incolorata is a moth of the family Megalopygidae. It was described by E. Dukinfield Jones in 1921.
