= Mesoscia itatiayae =

Scientific classification
- Kingdom: Animalia
- Phylum: Arthropoda
- Clade: Pancrustacea
- Class: Insecta
- Order: Lepidoptera
- Family: Megalopygidae
- Genus: Mesoscia
- Species: M. itatiayae

Binomial name
- Mesoscia itatiayae Hopp, 1927

Species of moth

Mesoscia itatiayae is a moth of the family Megalopygidae. It was described by Walter Hopp in 1927. It is found in Brazil.
