= Macara dyari =

Scientific classification
- Kingdom: Animalia
- Phylum: Arthropoda
- Clade: Pancrustacea
- Class: Insecta
- Order: Lepidoptera
- Family: Megalopygidae
- Genus: Macara
- Species: M. dyari

Binomial name
- Macara dyari (Dognin, 1914)

Synonyms
- Malmella dyari Dognin, 1914

Species of moth

Macara dyari is a moth of the family Megalopygidae. It was described by Paul Dognin in 1914. It is found in Colombia.
