= Thoscora acca =

Scientific classification
- Kingdom: Animalia
- Phylum: Arthropoda
- Clade: Pancrustacea
- Class: Insecta
- Order: Lepidoptera
- Family: Megalopygidae
- Genus: Thoscora
- Species: T. acca

Binomial name
- Thoscora acca (Schaus, 1892)

Synonyms
- Megalopyge acca Schaus, 1892; Trosia electra Hopp, 1922; Sciathos ribbei Druce, 1898

Species of moth

Thoscora acca is a moth of the Megalopygidae family. It was described by William Schaus in 1892. It is found in Guyana, Panama and Costa Rica.

The wingspan is 30 mm. The forewings are pinkish brown with a blackish median transverse line. The hindwings are roseate. The underside is roseate, with the apices of the forewings brownish. The head and thorax are brownish and the abdomen is red.

== Subspecies ==
- Thoscora acca acca
- Thoscora acca aterrima Hopp, 1930
