= Norape isabela =

Scientific classification
- Kingdom: Animalia
- Phylum: Arthropoda
- Clade: Pancrustacea
- Class: Insecta
- Order: Lepidoptera
- Family: Megalopygidae
- Genus: Norape
- Species: N. isabela

Binomial name
- Norape isabela Hopp, 1935

Species of moth

Norape isabela is a moth of the family Megalopygidae. It was described by Walter Hopp in 1935. It is found in Peru.
