= Mesoscia unifascia =

Scientific classification
- Kingdom: Animalia
- Phylum: Arthropoda
- Clade: Pancrustacea
- Class: Insecta
- Order: Lepidoptera
- Family: Megalopygidae
- Genus: Mesoscia
- Species: M. unifascia

Binomial name
- Mesoscia unifascia (Dognin, 1923)

Species of moth

Mesoscia unifascia is a moth of the Megalopygidae family. It was described by Paul Dognin in 1923.
