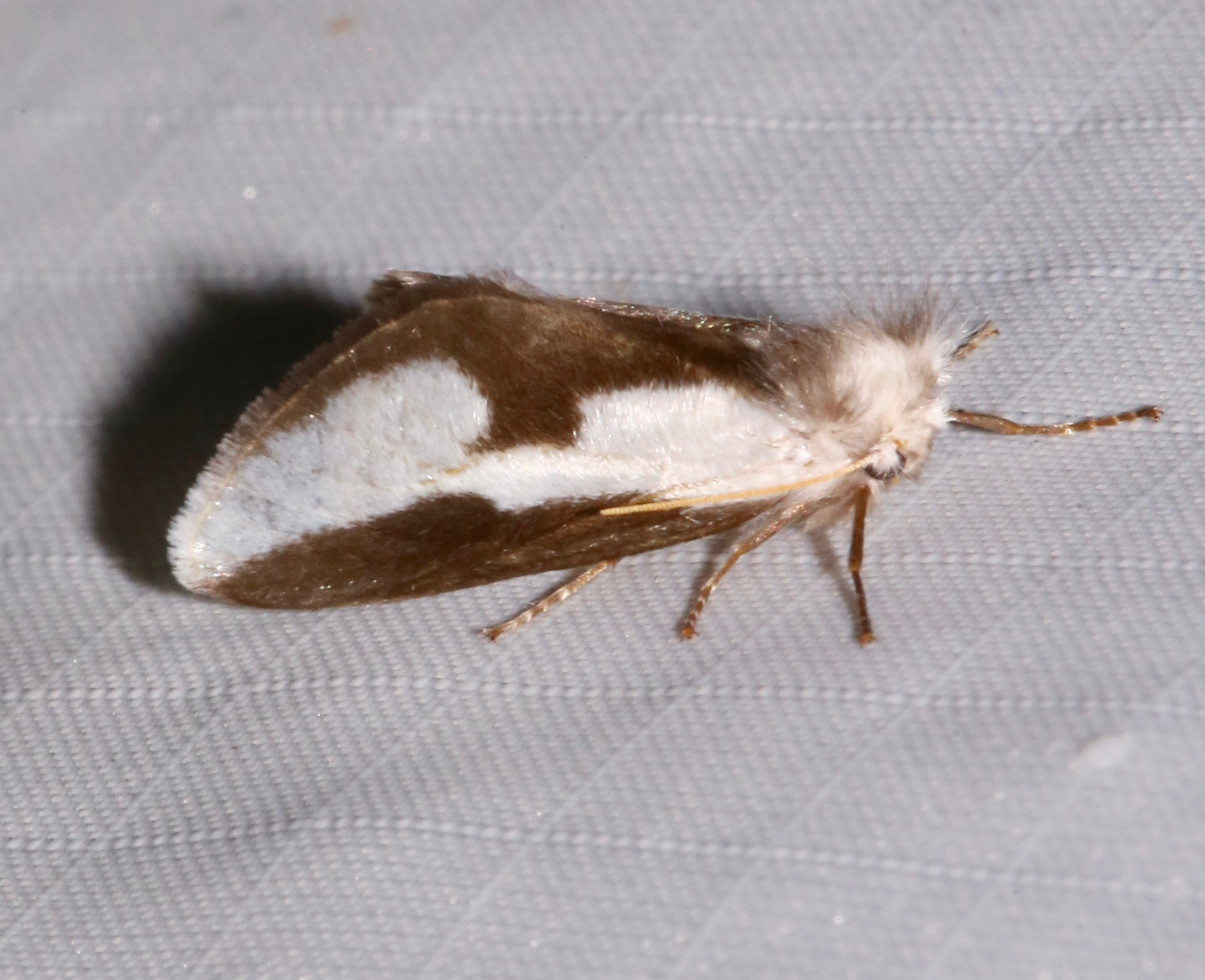

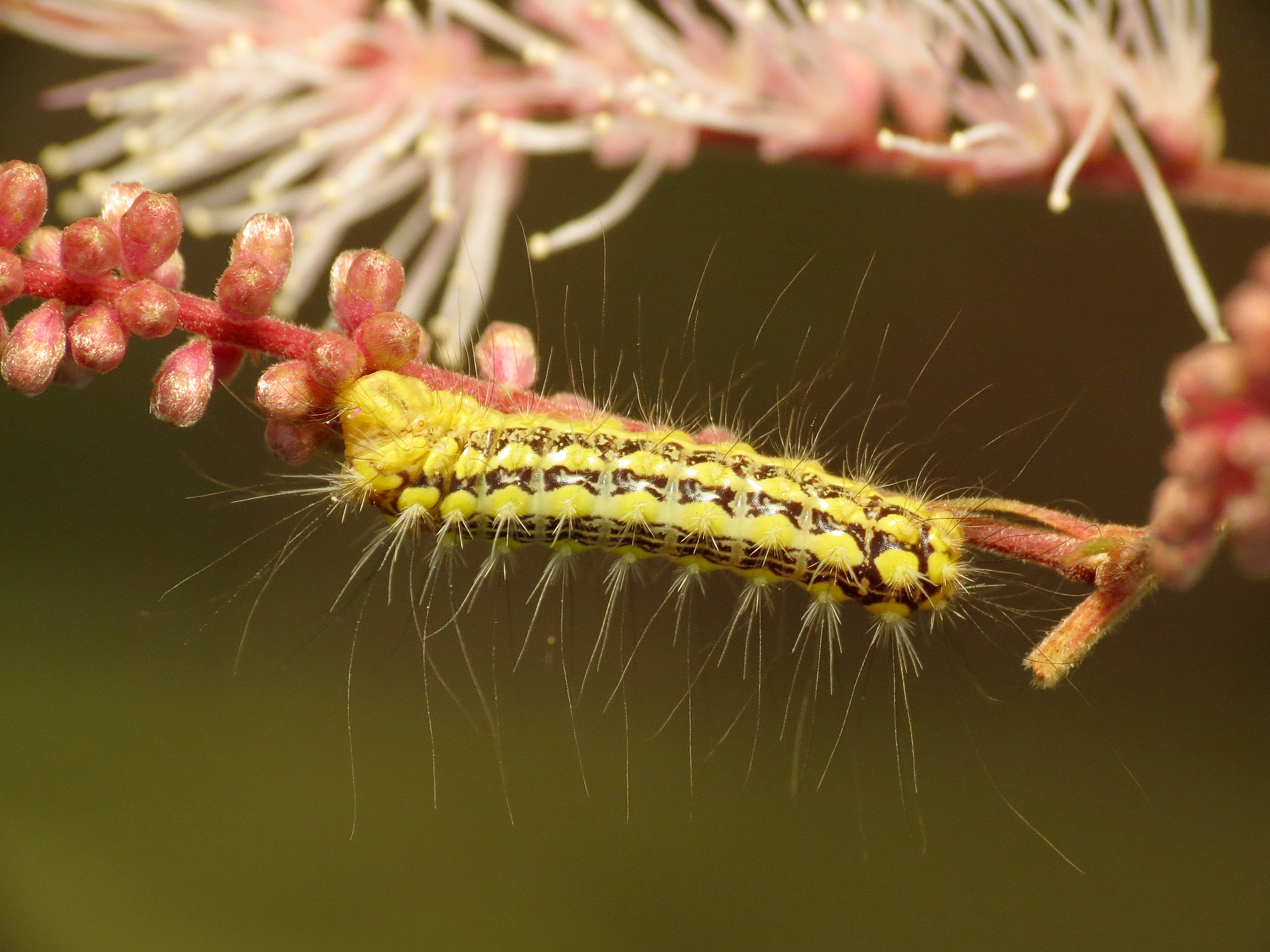
- Adult (top) and larva (bottom)

Scientific classification
- Kingdom: Animalia
- Phylum: Arthropoda
- Clade: Pancrustacea
- Class: Insecta
- Order: Lepidoptera
- Family: Megalopygidae
- Genus: Norape
- Species: N. tener

Binomial name
- Norape tener (H. Druce, 1897)

Synonyms
- Archylus tener H. Druce, 1897; Ramaca achriogelos Dyar, 1910

= Norape tener =

Species of moth

Norape tener, the mesquite stinger moth, is a species of moth in the family Megalopygidae. It was described by Herbert Druce in 1897. It is found in Mexico and the south-western US (south-eastern Arizona, and southern New Mexico).

The wingspan is about 29 mm (1.1 in). Adults are white, with the disk of the thorax blackish. The forewings have a broad brown-black costal edge, and the outer and inner margins and the fringe, except at the apex, are of the same color. The inner border has a branch reaching up to the cell at the origin of vein 2.

The larvae mainly feed on mesquite, acacia, paloverde and other desert plants. They are light green with black and white stripes and stinging hairs.

== Etymology ==
The species name is derived from Latin tenera (meaning soft).
