= Macara interpunctosa =

Scientific classification
- Kingdom: Animalia
- Phylum: Arthropoda
- Clade: Pancrustacea
- Class: Insecta
- Order: Lepidoptera
- Family: Megalopygidae
- Genus: Macara
- Species: M. interpunctosa

Binomial name
- Macara interpunctosa Dognin, 1914

Species of moth

Macara interpunctosa is a moth of the Megalopygidae family. It was described by Paul Dognin in 1914.
