= Mesoscia aspersa =

Scientific classification
- Kingdom: Animalia
- Phylum: Arthropoda
- Clade: Pancrustacea
- Class: Insecta
- Order: Lepidoptera
- Family: Megalopygidae
- Genus: Mesoscia
- Species: M. aspersa

Binomial name
- Mesoscia aspersa Dognin, 1922

Species of moth

Mesoscia aspersa is a moth of the Megalopygidae family. It was described by Paul Dognin in 1922.
