= Mesoscia dyari =

Scientific classification
- Kingdom: Animalia
- Phylum: Arthropoda
- Clade: Pancrustacea
- Class: Insecta
- Order: Lepidoptera
- Family: Megalopygidae
- Genus: Mesoscia
- Species: M. dyari

Binomial name
- Mesoscia dyari Schaus, 1912

Species of moth

Mesoscia dyari is a moth of the family Megalopygidae. It was described by William Schaus in 1912. It is found in Costa Rica.

The wingspan is 29 mm. The costal edge of the forewings is fuscous brown, below it (for two-thirds) is a broad yellowish-white shade, extending at the base to the inner margin. The medial space is fuscous brown, extending to the apex and outer margin below the submedian, where it is met by a paler grey-brown terminal broad shade, which does not extend above vein 4. The outer space is otherwise yellowish white, its inner edge oblique from the apex to vein 5, then incurved, tapering to a point above the submedian. The hindwings are white, the costa broadly, also the inner margin, and the outer margin near the anal angle more narrowly shaded with fuscous grey.
