= Norape cretacea =

Scientific classification
- Kingdom: Animalia
- Phylum: Arthropoda
- Clade: Pancrustacea
- Class: Insecta
- Order: Lepidoptera
- Family: Megalopygidae
- Genus: Norape
- Species: N. cretacea

Binomial name
- Norape cretacea (Hopp, 1922)

Synonyms
- Repnoa cretacea Hopp, 1922

Species of moth

Norape cretacea is a moth of the family Megalopygidae. It was described by Walter Hopp in 1922.
