= Hysterocladia lena =

Scientific classification
- Kingdom: Animalia
- Phylum: Arthropoda
- Clade: Pancrustacea
- Class: Insecta
- Order: Lepidoptera
- Family: Megalopygidae
- Genus: Hysterocladia
- Species: H. lena

Binomial name
- Hysterocladia lena (Schaus, 1912)

Synonyms
- Trosia lena Schaus, 1912

Species of moth

Hysterocladia lena is a moth of the Megalopygidae family. It was described by Schaus in 1912. It is found in Costa Rica.

The wingspan is about 25 millimetres (0.98 in). The antennae are crimson and the body is white. The frons is strongly shaded with crimson and the eyes are very black, narrowly surrounded by black hairs. The fore femora and coxae are fuscous brown and the wings are white.
