= Norape mexicana =

Scientific classification
- Kingdom: Animalia
- Phylum: Arthropoda
- Clade: Pancrustacea
- Class: Insecta
- Order: Lepidoptera
- Family: Megalopygidae
- Genus: Norape
- Species: N. mexicana

Binomial name
- Norape mexicana (Schaus, 1892)

Species of moth

Norape mexicana is a moth of the Megalopygidae family. It was described by William Schaus in 1892.
