= Mesoscia latifera =

Scientific classification
- Kingdom: Animalia
- Phylum: Arthropoda
- Clade: Pancrustacea
- Class: Insecta
- Order: Lepidoptera
- Family: Megalopygidae
- Genus: Mesoscia
- Species: M. latifera

Binomial name
- Mesoscia latifera Walker, 1869

Species of moth

Mesoscia latifera is a moth of the Megalopygidae family. It was described by Francis Walker in 1869.
