= Norapella gracilis =

Scientific classification
- Kingdom: Animalia
- Phylum: Arthropoda
- Clade: Pancrustacea
- Class: Insecta
- Order: Lepidoptera
- Family: Megalopygidae
- Genus: Norapella
- Species: N. gracilis

Binomial name
- Norapella gracilis (Dognin)

Species of moth

Norapella gracilis is a moth of the Megalopygidae family. It was described by Paul Dognin.
