= Norape truncata =

Scientific classification
- Kingdom: Animalia
- Phylum: Arthropoda
- Clade: Pancrustacea
- Class: Insecta
- Order: Lepidoptera
- Family: Megalopygidae
- Genus: Norape
- Species: N. truncata

Binomial name
- Norape truncata Hopp, 1927

Species of moth

Norape truncata is a moth of the family Megalopygidae. It was described by Walter Hopp in 1927. It is found in Venezuela, Peru and Colombia.

== Subspecies ==
- Norape truncata truncata (Venezuela)
- Norape truncata cavata Hopp, 1927 (Peru)
- Norape truncata hastata Hopp, 1927 (Colombia)
