= Mesoscia pusilla =

Scientific classification
- Kingdom: Animalia
- Phylum: Arthropoda
- Clade: Pancrustacea
- Class: Insecta
- Order: Lepidoptera
- Family: Megalopygidae
- Genus: Mesoscia
- Species: M. pusilla

Binomial name
- Mesoscia pusilla (Stoll, 1782)

Species of moth

Mesoscia pusilla is a moth of the Megalopygidae family. It was described by Caspar Stoll in 1782.
