= Thoscora omayena =

Scientific classification
- Kingdom: Animalia
- Phylum: Arthropoda
- Clade: Pancrustacea
- Class: Insecta
- Order: Lepidoptera
- Family: Megalopygidae
- Genus: Thoscora
- Species: T. omayena

Binomial name
- Thoscora omayena (Schaus, 1904)

Synonyms
- Gerontia omayena Schaus, 1904

Species of moth

Thoscora omayena is a moth of the Megalopygidae family. It was described by William Schaus in 1904. It is found in Guyana.

The wingspan is 40 mm. The head, thorax and forewings are grey, with the veins colored very dark. The abdomen and hindwings are dark fawn color.
