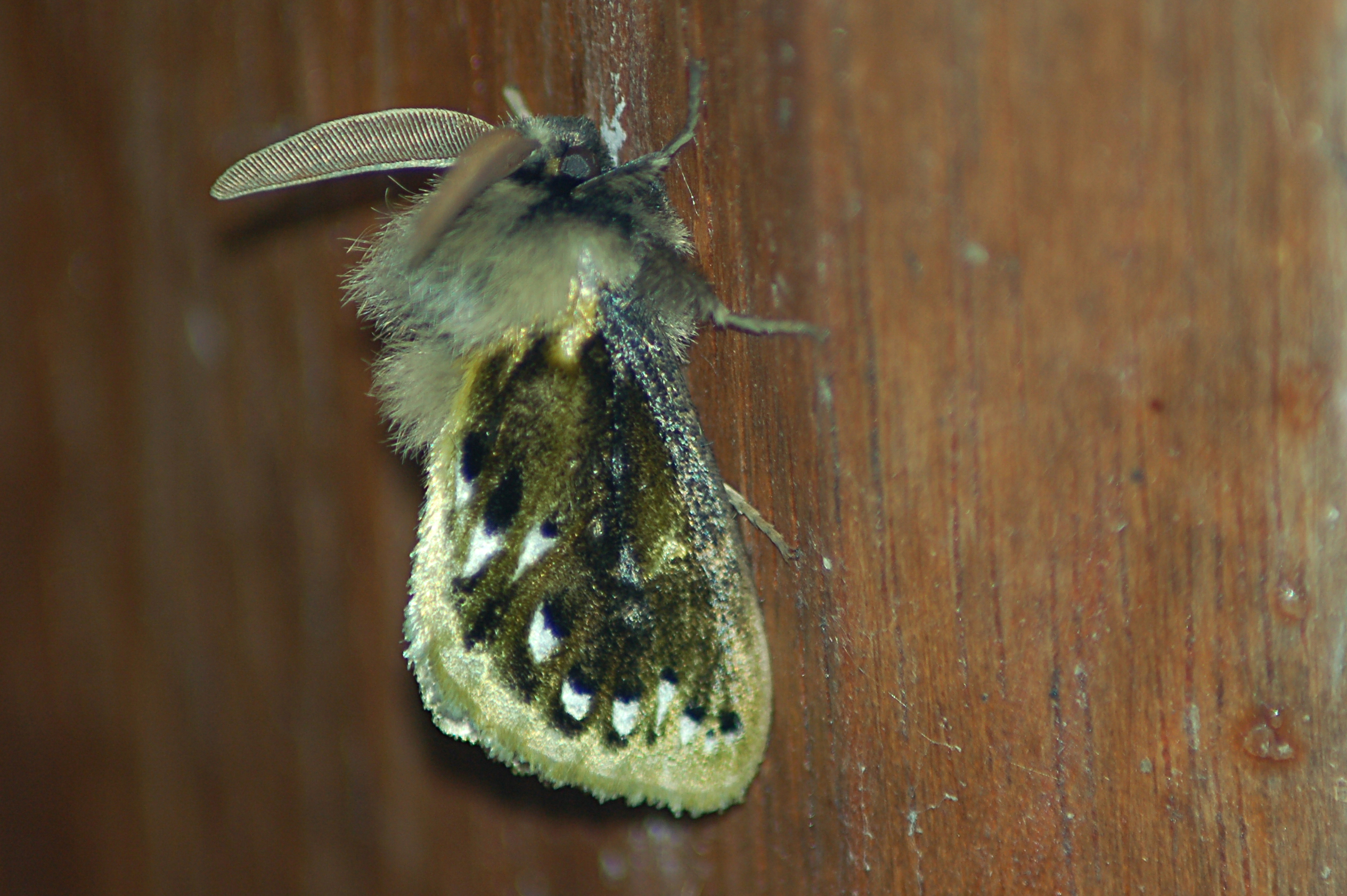

Scientific classification
- Kingdom: Animalia
- Phylum: Arthropoda
- Clade: Pancrustacea
- Class: Insecta
- Order: Lepidoptera
- Family: Megalopygidae
- Genus: Macara
- Species: M. alydda

Binomial name
- Macara alydda (H. Druce, 1887)

Synonyms
- Alpis alydda H. Druce, 1887; Norape nigella Dognin, 1916

= Macara alydda =

Species of moth

Macara alydda is a moth of the family Megalopygidae. It was described by Herbert Druce in 1887. It is found in Costa Rica and Napo Province, Ecuador. The habitat consists of montane cloud forests.

The forewings are dark silky brown, with the outer margin, from the apex to the anal angle, broadly banded with pale fawn. There is a series of silvery white spots (which have black dots on the side nearest the base) on the inner side of the pale colour. There are two black spots close to the apex and a pale-fawn mark at the end of the cell. The hindwings are uniform pale silky grey.

The larvae have been recorded feeding on a wide range of host plants, including Miconia capitellata, Miconia dielsii, Monochaetum lineatum, Andesanthus lepidotus (syn. Tibouchina lepidota), Nectandra species, Gunnera brephogea, Disterigma acuminatum, Psammisia species, Croton species, Alchornea pearcei, Alchornea grandis, Acalypha scandens, Acalypha macrstachya, Acalypha platyphylla, Erythrina edulis, Weinmania balbisiana, Clusia multiflora, Cayaponia macrocalix, Chusquea scandens and Rubus species. Early instar larvae feed in large groups.

== Subspecies ==
- Macara alydda alydda
- Macara alydda nigella (Dognin, 1916)
