= Norape discrepans =

Scientific classification
- Kingdom: Animalia
- Phylum: Arthropoda
- Clade: Pancrustacea
- Class: Insecta
- Order: Lepidoptera
- Family: Megalopygidae
- Genus: Norape
- Species: N. discrepans

Binomial name
- Norape discrepans (Wallengren, 1860)

Species of moth

Norape discrepans is a moth of the Megalopygidae family. It was described by Hans Daniel Johan Wallengren in 1860.
