= Macara nigripes =

Scientific classification
- Kingdom: Animalia
- Phylum: Arthropoda
- Clade: Pancrustacea
- Class: Insecta
- Order: Lepidoptera
- Family: Megalopygidae
- Genus: Macara
- Species: M. nigripes

Binomial name
- Macara nigripes (Dyar, 1909)

Synonyms
- Trosia nigripes Dyar, 1909

Species of moth

Macara nigripes is a moth of the Megalopygidae family. It was described by Harrison Gray Dyar Jr. in 1909. It is found in Guyana and Honduras.

The wingspan is about 42 mm. The body and wings above are entirely pure white, the forewings crossed by irregular bands of more shining scales. The wings and body are white beneath.
