= Macara purens =

Scientific classification
- Kingdom: Animalia
- Phylum: Arthropoda
- Clade: Pancrustacea
- Class: Insecta
- Order: Lepidoptera
- Family: Megalopygidae
- Genus: Macara
- Species: M. purens

Binomial name
- Macara purens (Schaus, 1905)

Synonyms
- Trosia purens Schaus, 1905; Sulychra mataca Schaus, 1929

Species of moth

Macara purens is a moth of the Megalopygidae family. It was described by Schaus in 1905. It is found in French Guiana.

The wingspan is about 35 millimetres (1.4 in). The body is white and the face, tarsi, fore tibiae and coxae are black. The wings are silvery white, the forewings with the costa finely black, which does not reach the apex.
