= Malmella strigiprima =

Scientific classification
- Kingdom: Animalia
- Phylum: Arthropoda
- Clade: Pancrustacea
- Class: Insecta
- Order: Lepidoptera
- Family: Megalopygidae
- Genus: Malmella
- Species: M. strigiprima

Binomial name
- Malmella strigiprima Dognin, 1914

Species of moth

Malmella strigiprima is a moth of the Megalopygidae family. It was described by Paul Dognin in 1914. It is found in Colombia.
