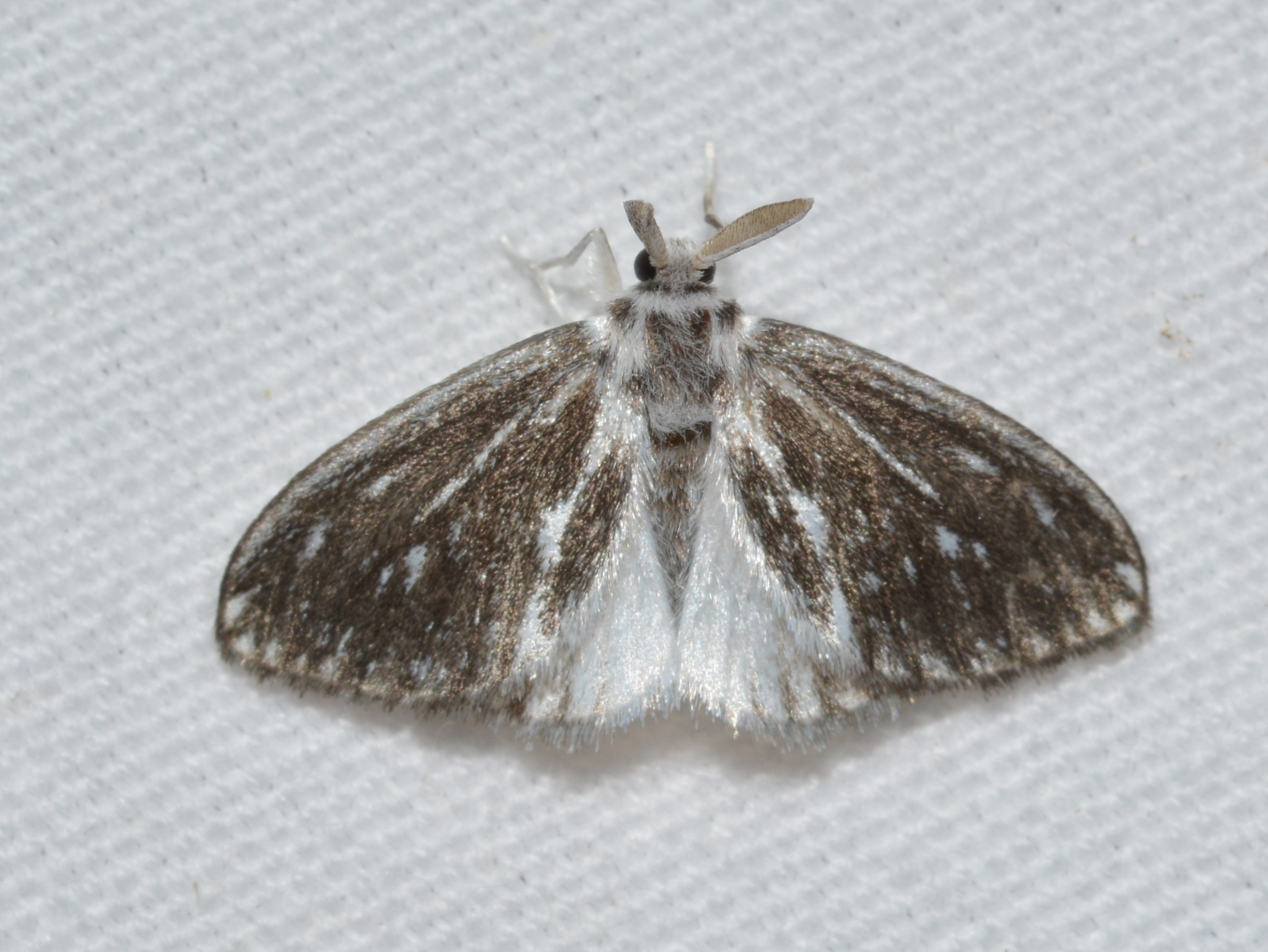

Scientific classification
- Kingdom: Animalia
- Phylum: Arthropoda
- Clade: Pancrustacea
- Class: Insecta
- Order: Lepidoptera
- Family: Megalopygidae
- Genus: Coamorpha
- Species: C. innoxia

Binomial name
- Coamorpha innoxia (Schaus, 1910)

Synonyms
- Dalcera innoxia Schaus, 1910

= Coamorpha innoxia =

Species of moths

Coamorpha innoxia is a species of moth in the family Megalopygidae. It is found in Costa Rica.

== Description ==
The wingspan is about 32 mm. The forewings are greyish brown with a white spot at the base and a white streak below the cell, interrupted by veins 2 and 3. There is a white streak above the basal half of the inner margin and there is some white on the extreme inner margin on the outer half. The fringe is white with dark spots at the end of the veins, and faint terminal white markings between the veins.
