= Norape puella =

Scientific classification
- Kingdom: Animalia
- Phylum: Arthropoda
- Clade: Pancrustacea
- Class: Insecta
- Order: Lepidoptera
- Family: Megalopygidae
- Genus: Norape
- Species: N. puella

Binomial name
- Norape puella Walker, 1855

Species of moth

Norape puella is a moth of the Megalopygidae family. It was described by Francis Walker in 1855.
