= Hysterocladia roseicollis =

Scientific classification
- Kingdom: Animalia
- Phylum: Arthropoda
- Clade: Pancrustacea
- Class: Insecta
- Order: Lepidoptera
- Family: Megalopygidae
- Genus: Hysterocladia
- Species: H. roseicollis

Binomial name
- Hysterocladia roseicollis Dognin, 1914

Synonyms
- Hysterocladia vicina Hopp, 1927

Species of moth

Hysterocladia roseicollis is a moth of the Megalopygidae family. It was described by Paul Dognin in 1914. It is found in Peru and French Guiana.
