= Microrape minuta =

Scientific classification
- Kingdom: Animalia
- Phylum: Arthropoda
- Clade: Pancrustacea
- Class: Insecta
- Order: Lepidoptera
- Family: Megalopygidae
- Genus: Microrape
- Species: M. minuta

Binomial name
- Microrape minuta (H. Druce, 1886)

Synonyms
- Carama minuta Druce, 1886

Species of moth

Microrape minuta is a moth of the family Megalopygidae. It was described by Herbert Druce in 1886. It is found in Panama and Costa Rica.

The forewings and hindwings are uniform silky white, slightly shaded with cream-colour on the costal margin and apex of the forewings.
