= Norape xantholopha =

Scientific classification
- Kingdom: Animalia
- Phylum: Arthropoda
- Clade: Pancrustacea
- Class: Insecta
- Order: Lepidoptera
- Family: Megalopygidae
- Genus: Norape
- Species: N. xantholopha

Binomial name
- Norape xantholopha Dyar, 1914

Synonyms
- Norape corporalis Hopp, 1927

Species of moth

Norape xantholopha is a moth of the Megalopygidae family. It was described by Harrison Gray Dyar Jr. in 1914. It is found in Panama, Guatemala, Colombia and Peru.

The wingspan is 35 mm. Adults are white, the forewings without appressed lines and the costa white below.

== Subspecies ==
- Norape xantholopha xantholopha (Panama)
- Norape xantholopha major Hopp, 1927 (Colombia)
- Norape xantholopha minor Hopp, 1927 (Peru)
