= Mesoscia lorna =

Scientific classification
- Kingdom: Animalia
- Phylum: Arthropoda
- Clade: Pancrustacea
- Class: Insecta
- Order: Lepidoptera
- Family: Megalopygidae
- Genus: Mesoscia
- Species: M. lorna

Binomial name
- Mesoscia lorna Schaus, 1905

Species of moth

Mesoscia lorna is a moth of the family Megalopygidae. It was described by William Schaus in 1905. It is found in French Guiana.

The wingspan is 25 mm. The costal margin, cell (and a space below it) on the forewings are all whitish, with some pale yellow at the base and along the inner margin. The outer margin below vein 7 is broadly pale grey, crossed by dark brown veins, and with long darker grey streaks between the veins. There are some yellowish postmedial points on veins. The hindwings are grey, darkest along the inner margin with a little white on the outer margin. The veins are darker, and there are traces of darker streaks between the veins.
