= Mesoscia pascora =

Scientific classification
- Kingdom: Animalia
- Phylum: Arthropoda
- Clade: Pancrustacea
- Class: Insecta
- Order: Lepidoptera
- Family: Megalopygidae
- Genus: Mesoscia
- Species: M. pascora

Binomial name
- Mesoscia pascora Schaus, 1900

Species of moth

Mesoscia pascora is a moth of the family Megalopygidae. It was described by William Schaus in 1900. It is found in Brazil.

The wingspan is about 25 mm. The forewings are white with a black spot at the base, surmounted by pinkish scales. The costa is black at the base and there is a dark grey band from the inner margin where it is broad, and narrowing towards the apex, broken by the whitish veins. A terminal row of grey spots does not reach apex. The hindwings are whitish, with the inner margin grey and a grey shade from the inner margin to the costa near the apex. There is a terminal row of grey spots and the fringe is grey at the base.
