= Norape cana =

Scientific classification
- Kingdom: Animalia
- Phylum: Arthropoda
- Clade: Pancrustacea
- Class: Insecta
- Order: Lepidoptera
- Family: Megalopygidae
- Genus: Norape
- Species: N. cana

Binomial name
- Norape cana (Dognin, 1907)

Synonyms
- Sciathos cana Dognin, 1907

Species of moth

Norape cana is a moth of the Megalopygidae family. It was described by Paul Dognin in 1907. It is found in Colombia.
