= Microrape nivea =

Scientific classification
- Kingdom: Animalia
- Phylum: Arthropoda
- Clade: Pancrustacea
- Class: Insecta
- Order: Lepidoptera
- Family: Megalopygidae
- Genus: Microrape
- Species: M. nivea

Binomial name
- Microrape nivea (Hopp, 1922)

Synonyms
- Vescoa nivea Hopp, 1922; Mesoscia sycophanta Dognin, 1923

Species of moth

Microrape nivea is a moth of the family Megalopygidae. It was described by Walter Hopp in 1922. It is found in Bolivia.

The wingspan is 19–21 mm.
