= Norape miasma =

Scientific classification
- Kingdom: Animalia
- Phylum: Arthropoda
- Clade: Pancrustacea
- Class: Insecta
- Order: Lepidoptera
- Family: Megalopygidae
- Genus: Norape
- Species: N. miasma

Binomial name
- Norape miasma Dyar, 1910

Species of moth

Norape miasma is a moth of the Megalopygidae family. It was described by Harrison Gray Dyar Jr. in 1910.
