= Aithorape longanella =

Scientific classification
- Kingdom: Animalia
- Phylum: Arthropoda
- Clade: Pancrustacea
- Class: Insecta
- Order: Lepidoptera
- Family: Megalopygidae
- Genus: Aithorape
- Species: A. longanella

Binomial name
- Aithorape longanella Hopp, 1927

Species of moth

Aithorape longanella is a moth of the family Megalopygidae. It was described by Walter Hopp in 1927. It is found in Peru.
