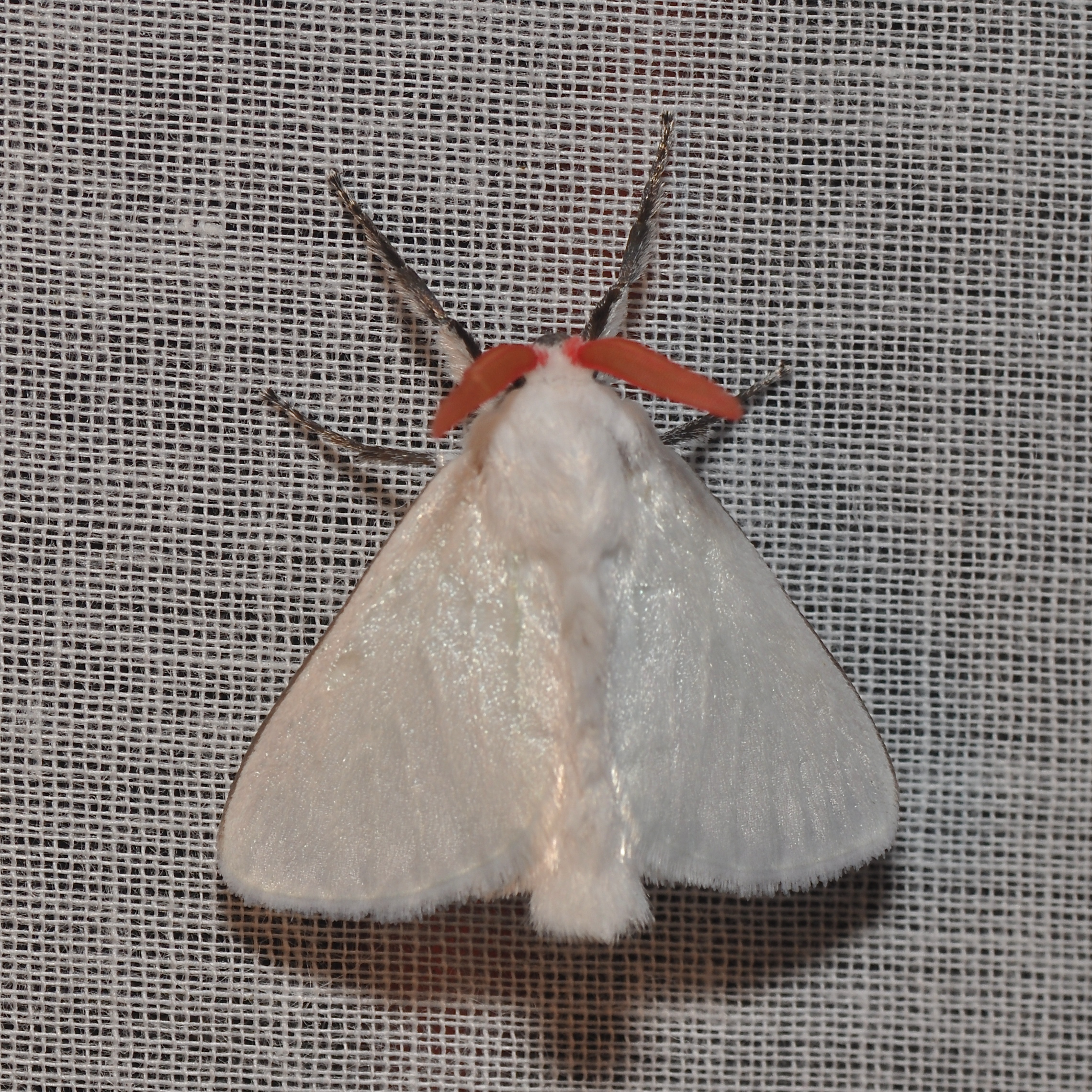

Scientific classification
- Kingdom: Animalia
- Phylum: Arthropoda
- Clade: Pancrustacea
- Class: Insecta
- Order: Lepidoptera
- Family: Megalopygidae
- Genus: Aithorape
- Species: A. roseicornis

Binomial name
- Aithorape roseicornis (Dognin, 1899)

Synonyms
- Carama roseicornis Dognin, 1899; Carama bella Dognin, 1906

= Aithorape roseicornis =

Dognin's satin

Species of moth

Aithorape roseicornis, known as the rosy crown satin or Dognin's satin, is a moth of the family Megalopygidae. It was described by Paul Dognin in 1899. It is found in Colombia, Ecuador and Peru, where it inhabits rainforests and cloudforests at altitudes between 200 and 1,200 meters.
