= Norape beggoides =

Scientific classification
- Kingdom: Animalia
- Phylum: Arthropoda
- Clade: Pancrustacea
- Class: Insecta
- Order: Lepidoptera
- Family: Megalopygidae
- Genus: Norape
- Species: N. beggoides

Binomial name
- Norape beggoides (Dyar, 1910)

Synonyms
- Trosia beggoides Dyar, 1910

Species of moth

Norape beggoides is a moth of the Megalopygidae family. It was described by Harrison Gray Dyar Jr. in 1910. It is found in Brazil.

The wingspan is about 34 mm for males and 50 mm for females. Adults are white, with the wings smooth and silky. The costa of the forewings is black and the head is strongly tinged with yellow, the thorax and the abdomen less strongly so. The orbits, palpi, pectus, and all the tarsi are black.
