= Microcladia pygmaea =

Scientific classification
- Kingdom: Animalia
- Phylum: Arthropoda
- Clade: Pancrustacea
- Class: Insecta
- Order: Lepidoptera
- Family: Megalopygidae
- Genus: Microcladia
- Species: M. pygmaea

Binomial name
- Microcladia pygmaea Hopp, 1927

Species of moth

Microcladia pygmaea is a moth of the family Megalopygidae. It was described by Walter Hopp in 1927.
