= Malmella nigricollis =

Scientific classification
- Kingdom: Animalia
- Phylum: Arthropoda
- Clade: Pancrustacea
- Class: Insecta
- Order: Lepidoptera
- Family: Megalopygidae
- Genus: Malmella
- Species: M. nigricollis

Binomial name
- Malmella nigricollis Hopp, 1927

Species of moth

Malmella nigricollis is a moth of the family Megalopygidae. It was described by Walter Hopp in 1927. It is found in Peru.
