= Hysterocladia eriphua =

Scientific classification
- Kingdom: Animalia
- Phylum: Arthropoda
- Clade: Pancrustacea
- Class: Insecta
- Order: Lepidoptera
- Family: Megalopygidae
- Genus: Hysterocladia
- Species: H. eriphua

Binomial name
- Hysterocladia eriphua (Dognin, 1914)

Synonyms
- Malmella eriphua Dognin, 1914

Species of moth

Hysterocladia eriphua is a moth of the Megalopygidae family. It was described by Paul Dognin in 1914. It is found in Panama.
