= Thoscora rubrivena =

Scientific classification
- Kingdom: Animalia
- Phylum: Arthropoda
- Clade: Pancrustacea
- Class: Insecta
- Order: Lepidoptera
- Family: Megalopygidae
- Genus: Thoscora
- Species: T. rubrivena

Binomial name
- Thoscora rubrivena (E. D. Jones, 1912)

Synonyms
- Edebessa rubrivena E. D. Jones, 1912

Species of moth

Thoscora rubrivena is a moth of the family Megalopygidae. It was described by E. Dukinfield Jones in 1912. It is found in Brazil.

The wingspan is about 30 mm. The forewings are light brown and thinly scaled. The costa and veins, with the exception of the subcostal nervure and submedian veins, are red. The hindwings are rose pink.
