= Hysterocladia werneri =

Scientific classification
- Kingdom: Animalia
- Phylum: Arthropoda
- Clade: Pancrustacea
- Class: Insecta
- Order: Lepidoptera
- Family: Megalopygidae
- Genus: Hysterocladia
- Species: H. werneri

Binomial name
- Hysterocladia werneri Hopp, 1927

Species of moth

Hysterocladia werneri is a moth of the family Megalopygidae. It was described by Walter Hopp in 1927. It is found in Colombia.
