= Hysterocladia mirabilis =

Scientific classification
- Kingdom: Animalia
- Phylum: Arthropoda
- Clade: Pancrustacea
- Class: Insecta
- Order: Lepidoptera
- Family: Megalopygidae
- Genus: Hysterocladia
- Species: H. mirabilis

Binomial name
- Hysterocladia mirabilis (Schaus, 1905)

Synonyms
- Trosia mirabilis Schaus, 1905

Species of moth

Hysterocladia mirabilis is a moth of the Megalopygidae family. It was described by Schaus in 1905. It is found in Colombia.

The wingspan is about 37 millimetres (1.5 in). The body is white, the front is black, the antennae and vertex bright red and the mid- and fore-legs are brown. The anal hairs are black. The wings are white, the costal margin of the forewings black.
