= Hysterocladia elongata =

Scientific classification
- Kingdom: Animalia
- Phylum: Arthropoda
- Clade: Pancrustacea
- Class: Insecta
- Order: Lepidoptera
- Family: Megalopygidae
- Genus: Hysterocladia
- Species: H. elongata

Binomial name
- Hysterocladia elongata Hopp, 1927

Species of moth

Hysterocladia elongata is a moth of the family Megalopygidae. It was described by Walter Hopp in 1927. It is found in Peru.
