= Microrape santiago =

Scientific classification
- Kingdom: Animalia
- Phylum: Arthropoda
- Clade: Pancrustacea
- Class: Insecta
- Order: Lepidoptera
- Family: Megalopygidae
- Genus: Microrape
- Species: M. santiago

Binomial name
- Microrape santiago (Hopp, 1439)

Synonyms
- Vescoa santiago Hopp, 1922

Species of moth

Microrape santiago is a moth of the family Megalopygidae. It was described by Walter Hopp in 1922. It is found in Colombia.

The wingspan is 10.5 mm.
