= Norape vesta =

Scientific classification
- Kingdom: Animalia
- Phylum: Arthropoda
- Clade: Pancrustacea
- Class: Insecta
- Order: Lepidoptera
- Family: Megalopygidae
- Genus: Norape
- Species: N. vesta

Binomial name
- Norape vesta (Schaus, 1892)

Species of moth

Norape vesta is a moth of the Megalopygidae family. It was described by William Schaus in 1892.
