= Hysterocladia unimana =

Scientific classification
- Kingdom: Animalia
- Phylum: Arthropoda
- Clade: Pancrustacea
- Class: Insecta
- Order: Lepidoptera
- Family: Megalopygidae
- Genus: Hysterocladia
- Species: H. unimana

Binomial name
- Hysterocladia unimana Hopp, 1943

Species of moth

Hysterocladia unimana is a moth of the family Megalopygidae. It was described by Walter Hopp in 1943. It is found in Brazil.
