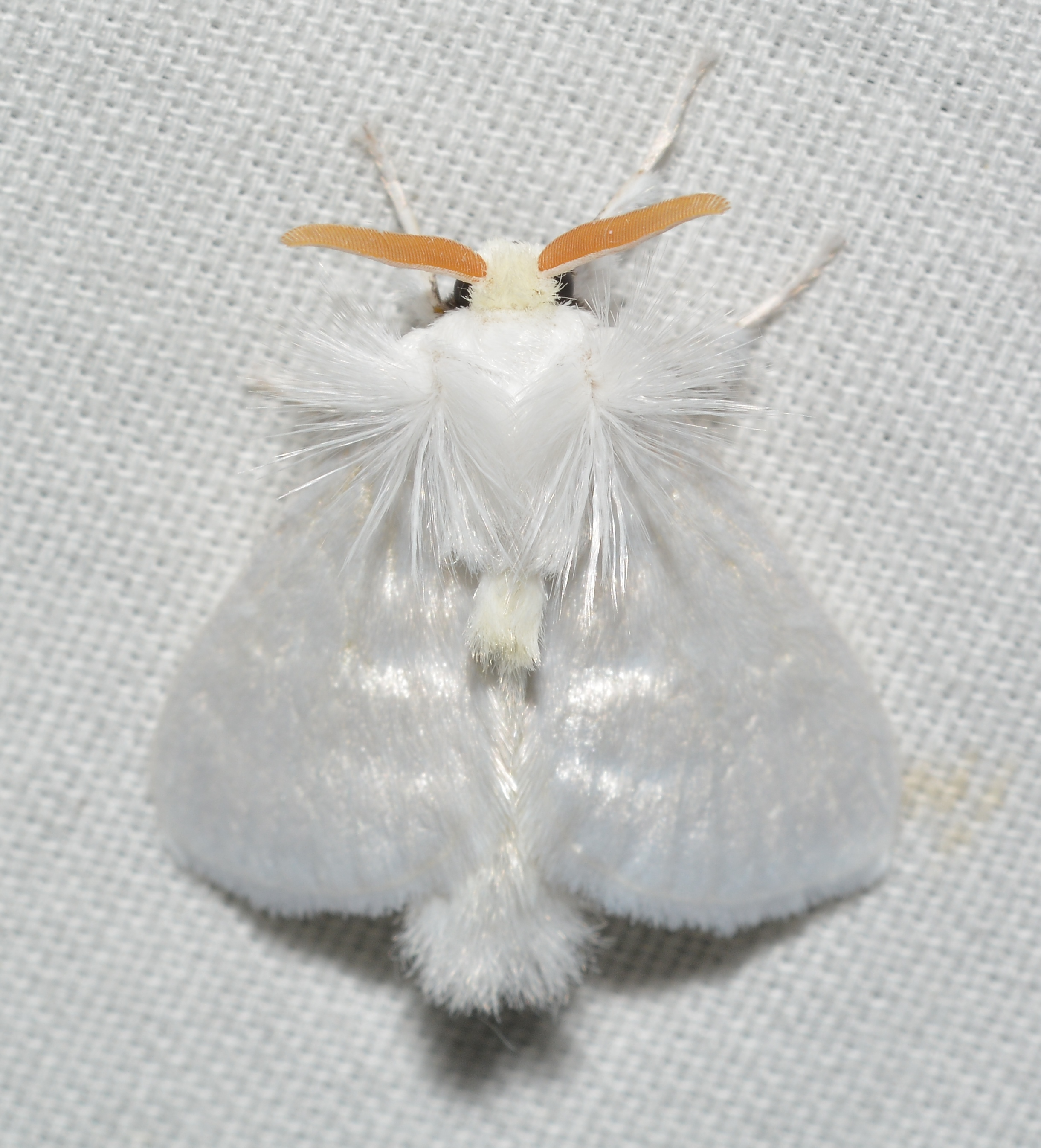
- Adult
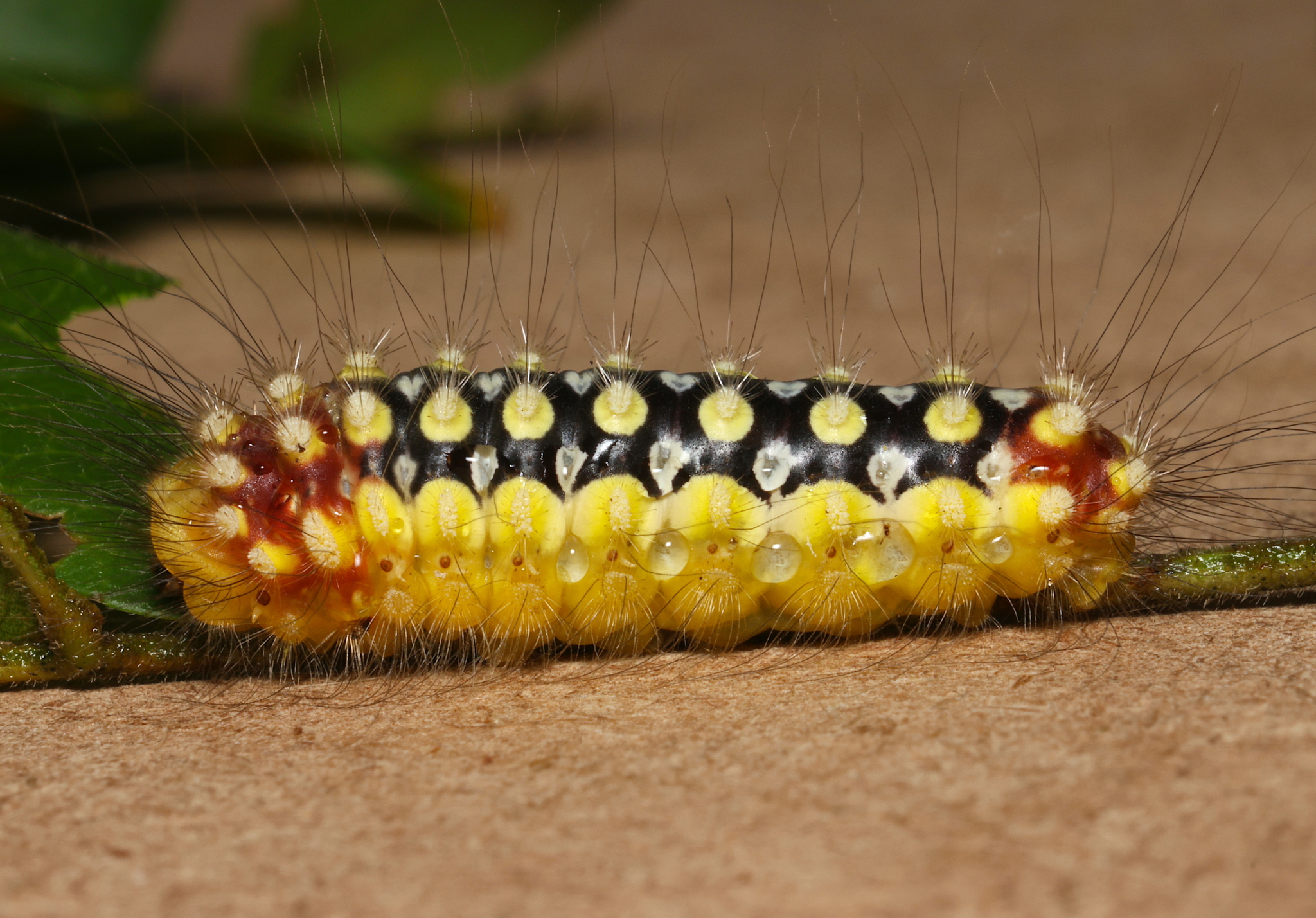
- Larva

Scientific classification
- Kingdom: Animalia
- Phylum: Arthropoda
- Clade: Pancrustacea
- Class: Insecta
- Order: Lepidoptera
- Family: Megalopygidae
- Genus: Norape
- Species: N. ovina

Binomial name
- Norape ovina (Sepp, [1848])

Synonyms
- Phalaena ovina Sepp, [1848]; Ulosota cretata Grote, 1864; Carama ovina

= Norape ovina =

Species of moth

Norape ovina, the white flannel moth, is a moth of the Megalopygidae family. In the United States, it is found from Washington, D.C. south to Florida, west to Montana and Texas. Its range extends further south through Mexico, Guatemala and Panama to Venezuela, Suriname and Bolivia.

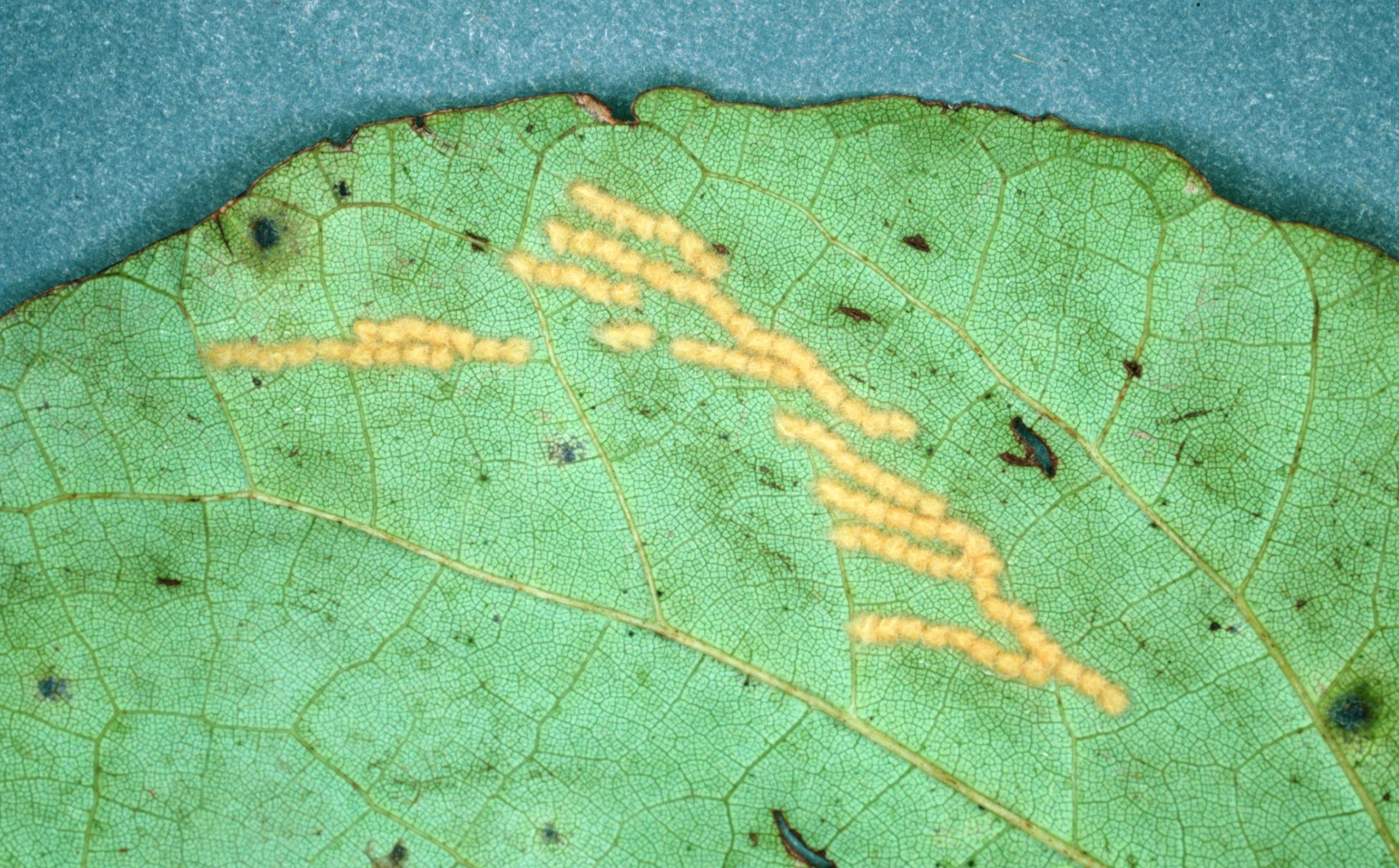
Eggs

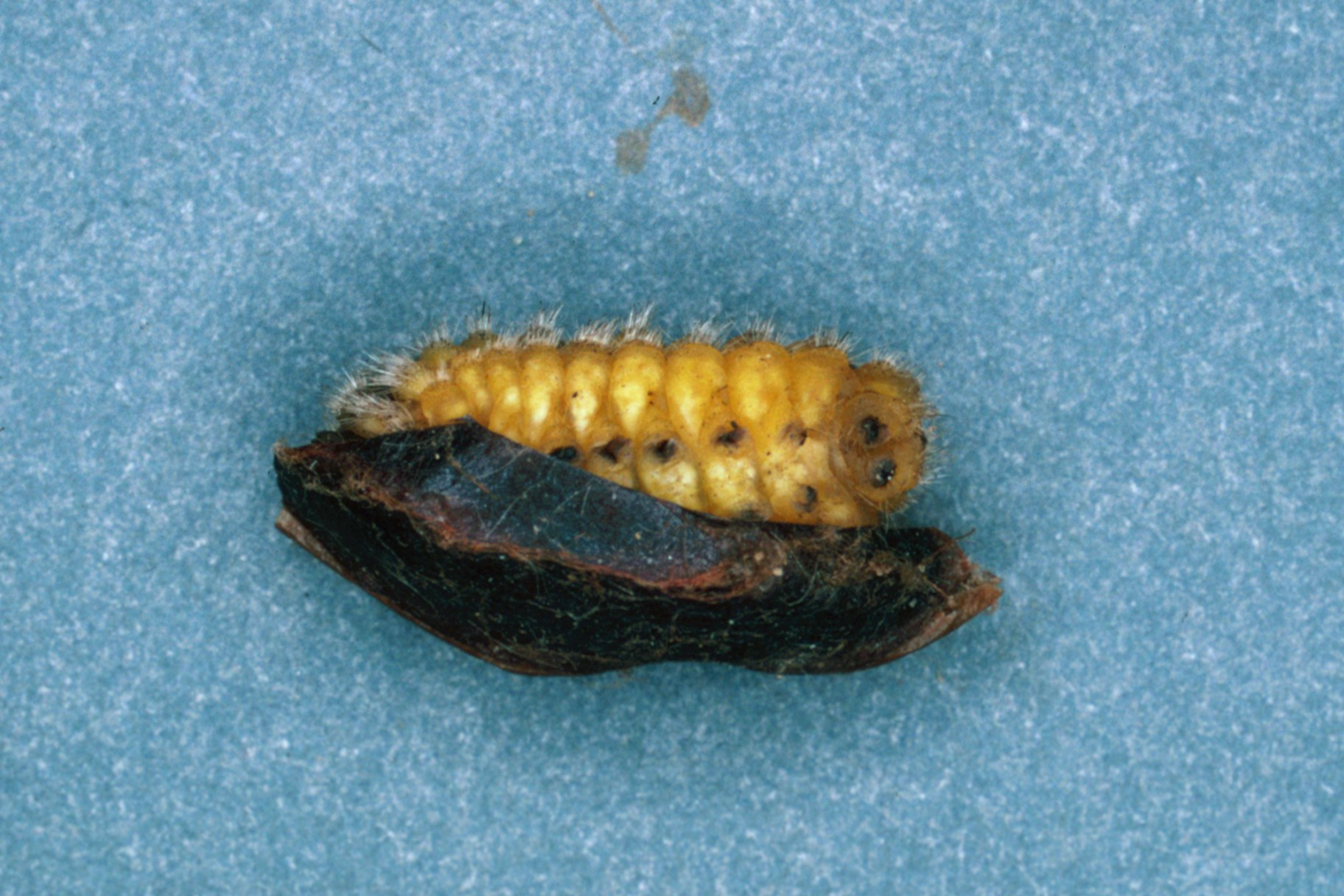
Pupa

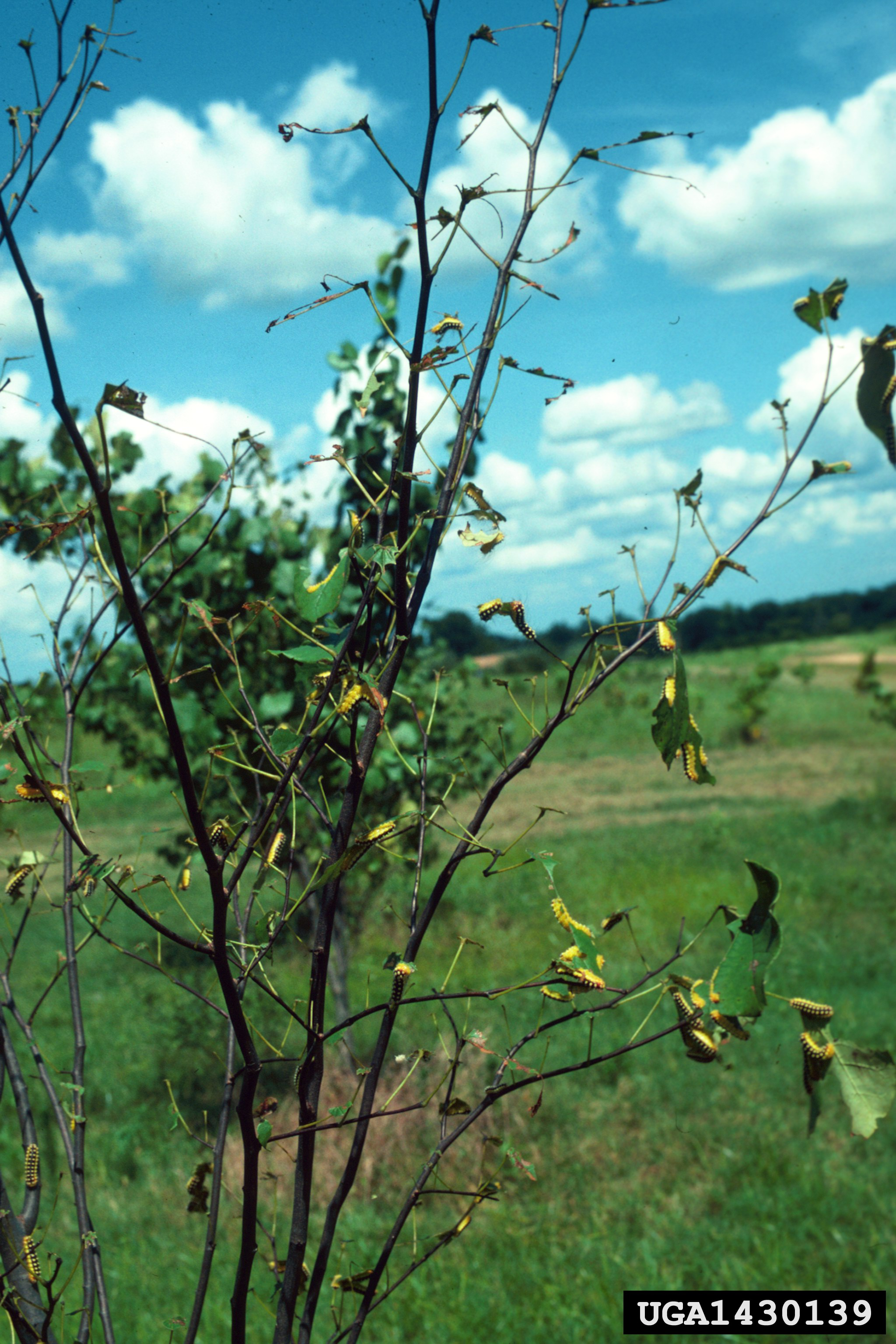
Damage

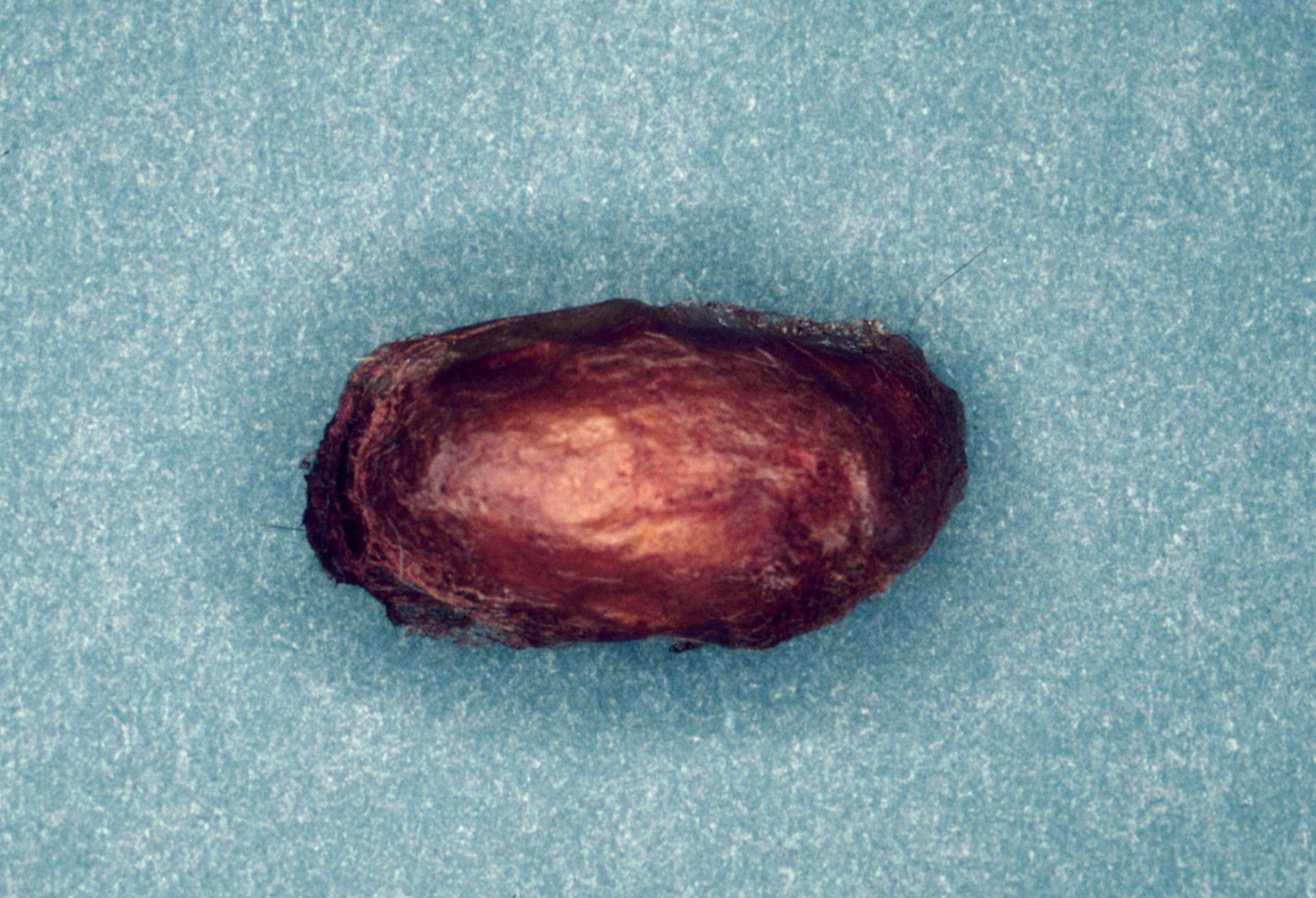
Cocoon

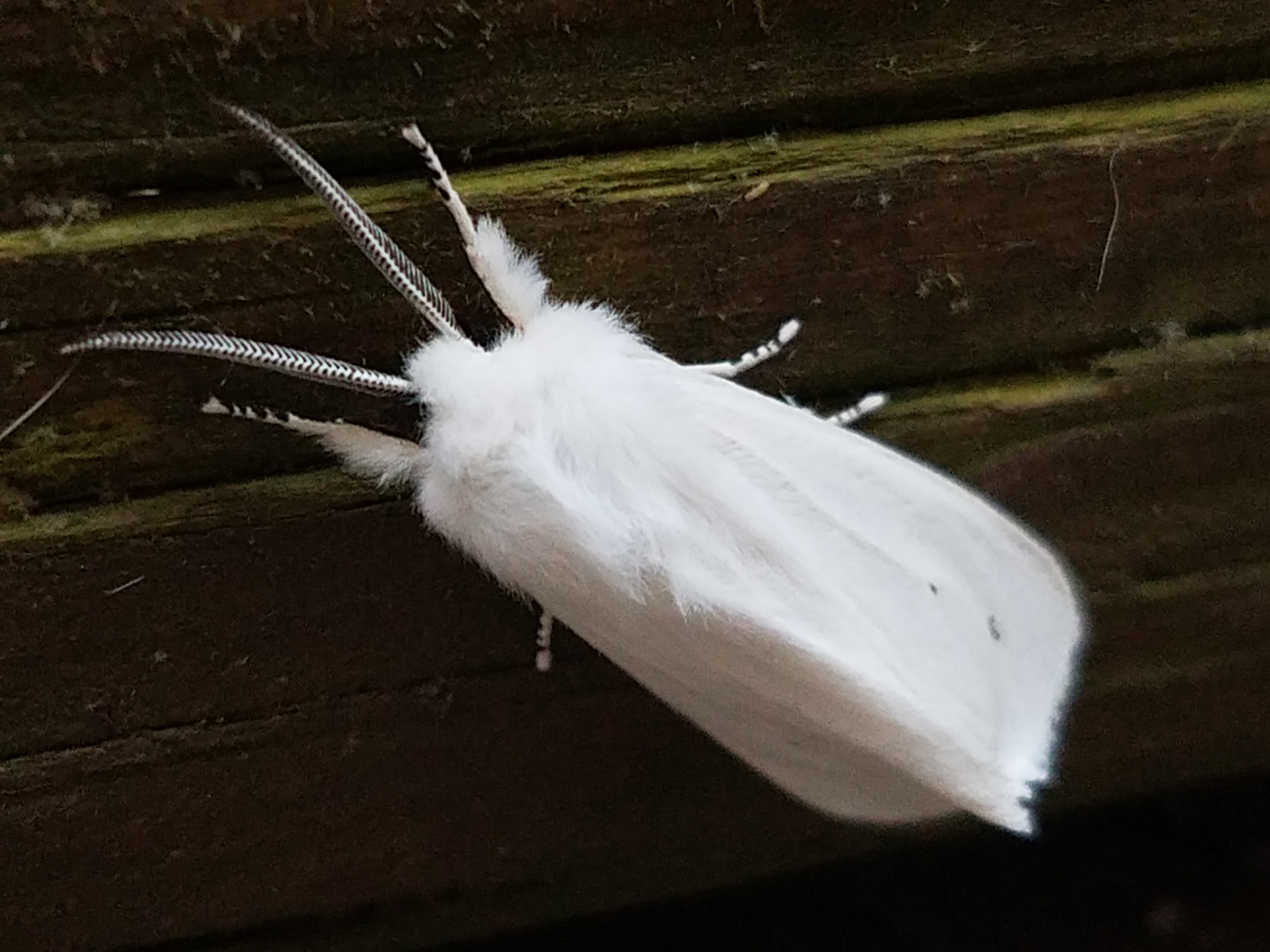
Adult

Its wingspan is 27–33 mm. Adults are on wing from April to May and from July to October. There are two per year in the north, likely more in south.

The stinging larvae feed on hackberry and redbud.
