= Norape dyarensis =

Scientific classification
- Kingdom: Animalia
- Phylum: Arthropoda
- Clade: Pancrustacea
- Class: Insecta
- Order: Lepidoptera
- Family: Megalopygidae
- Genus: Norape
- Species: N. dyarensis

Binomial name
- Norape dyarensis Hopp, 1929

Species of moth

Norape dyarensis is a moth of the family Megalopygidae. It was described by Walter Hopp in 1929.
