= Norape nigrovenosa =

Scientific classification
- Kingdom: Animalia
- Phylum: Arthropoda
- Clade: Pancrustacea
- Class: Insecta
- Order: Lepidoptera
- Family: Megalopygidae
- Genus: Norape
- Species: N. nigrovenosa

Binomial name
- Norape nigrovenosa (H. Druce, 1906)

Species of moth

Norape nigrovenosa is a moth of the family Megalopygidae. It was described by Herbert Druce in 1906.
