= Microrape simplex =

Scientific classification
- Kingdom: Animalia
- Phylum: Arthropoda
- Clade: Pancrustacea
- Class: Insecta
- Order: Lepidoptera
- Family: Megalopygidae
- Genus: Microrape
- Species: M. simplex

Binomial name
- Microrape simplex Hopp, 1927

Species of moth

Microrape simplex is a moth of the family Megalopygidae. It was described by Walter Hopp in 1927. It is found in Peru.
