= Macara pasaleuca =

Scientific classification
- Kingdom: Animalia
- Phylum: Arthropoda
- Clade: Pancrustacea
- Class: Insecta
- Order: Lepidoptera
- Family: Megalopygidae
- Genus: Macara
- Species: M. pasaleuca

Binomial name
- Macara pasaleuca (Maassen, 1899)

Synonyms
- Leucoma pasaleuca Maassen, 1899; Mesoscia niveitincta Dognin, 1922

Species of moth

Macara pasaleuca is a moth of the family Megalopygidae. It was described by Peter Maassen in 1899. It is found in Colombia.
