= Aithorape frontalis =

Scientific classification
- Kingdom: Animalia
- Phylum: Arthropoda
- Clade: Pancrustacea
- Class: Insecta
- Order: Lepidoptera
- Family: Megalopygidae
- Genus: Aithorape
- Species: A. frontalis

Binomial name
- Aithorape frontalis (Schaus, 1920)

Synonyms
- Norape frontalis Schaus, 1920

Species of moth

Aithorape frontalis is a moth of the Megalopygidae family. It was described by Schaus in 1920. It is found in Guatemala.

The wingspan is about 27 mm. The body and wings are white, the latter somewhat silvery. The antennae with the shaft and pectinations crimson and the frons is light brown. The throat and tarsi are dark brown.
