= Cephalocladia fulvicornis =

Scientific classification
- Kingdom: Animalia
- Phylum: Arthropoda
- Clade: Pancrustacea
- Class: Insecta
- Order: Lepidoptera
- Family: Megalopygidae
- Genus: Cephalocladia
- Species: C. fulvicornis

Binomial name
- Cephalocladia fulvicornis (Dognin, 1923)

Synonyms
- Hysterocladia fulvicornis Dognin, 1923

Species of moth

Cephalocladia fulvicornis is a moth of the Megalopygidae family. It was described by Paul Dognin in 1923. It is found in Brazil.
