= Proterocladia =

Scientific classification
- Kingdom: Animalia
- Phylum: Arthropoda
- Clade: Pancrustacea
- Class: Insecta
- Order: Lepidoptera
- Family: Megalopygidae
- Genus: Proterocladia; Hopp, 1927

Genus of moths

Proterocladia is a genus of moths in the family Megalopygidae.

== Species ==
- Proterocladia roseata (Hopp, 1922)
