= Zyzypyge =

Scientific classification
- Kingdom: Animalia
- Phylum: Arthropoda
- Clade: Pancrustacea
- Class: Insecta
- Order: Lepidoptera
- Family: Megalopygidae
- Genus: Zyzypyge; Hopp, 1930
- Species: Z. calycina

Binomial name
- Zyzypyge calycina Hopp, 1930

Genus of moths

Zyzypyge is a monotypic moth genus in the family Megalopygidae described by Walter Hopp in 1930. Its single species, Zyzypyge calycina, described by the same author in the same year, is found in Brazil.
