= Thoscora =

Scientific classification
- Kingdom: Animalia
- Phylum: Arthropoda
- Clade: Pancrustacea
- Class: Insecta
- Order: Lepidoptera
- Family: Megalopygidae
- Genus: Thoscora; Schaus, 1904

Genus of moths

Thoscora is a genus of moths in the family Megalopygidae.

== Species ==
- Thoscora rubrivena (E. D. Jones, 1912)
- Thoscora omayena (Schaus, 1904)
- Thoscora brugea (Schaus, 1904)
- Thoscora acca (Schaus, 1892)
  - Thoscora acca aterrima (Hopp, 1930)
