= Mesoscia =

Scientific classification
- Kingdom: Animalia
- Phylum: Arthropoda
- Clade: Pancrustacea
- Class: Insecta
- Order: Lepidoptera
- Family: Megalopygidae
- Genus: Mesoscia; Hübner, 1820

Synonyms
- Archylus Walker, 1856; Ramaca Dyar, 1910; Saltiga Walker, 1869

Genus of moths

Mesoscia is a genus of moths in the family Megalopygidae.

== Species ==
- Mesoscia anguilinea Schaus, 1912
- Mesoscia dumilla Dyar, 1913
- Mesoscia dyari Schaus, 1912
- Mesoscia eriophora (Sepp, 1848)
- Mesoscia guttifascia (Walker, 1856)
- Mesoscia itatiayae Hopp, 1927
- Mesoscia latifera Walker, 1869
- Mesoscia lorna Schaus, 1905
- Mesoscia pascora Schaus, 1900
- Mesoscia procera Hopp, 1930
- Mesoscia pusilla (Stoll, 1782)
- Mesoscia terminata Schaus, 1905
- Mesoscia unifascia (Dognin, 1923)
- Mesoscia aspersa Dognin, 1922
