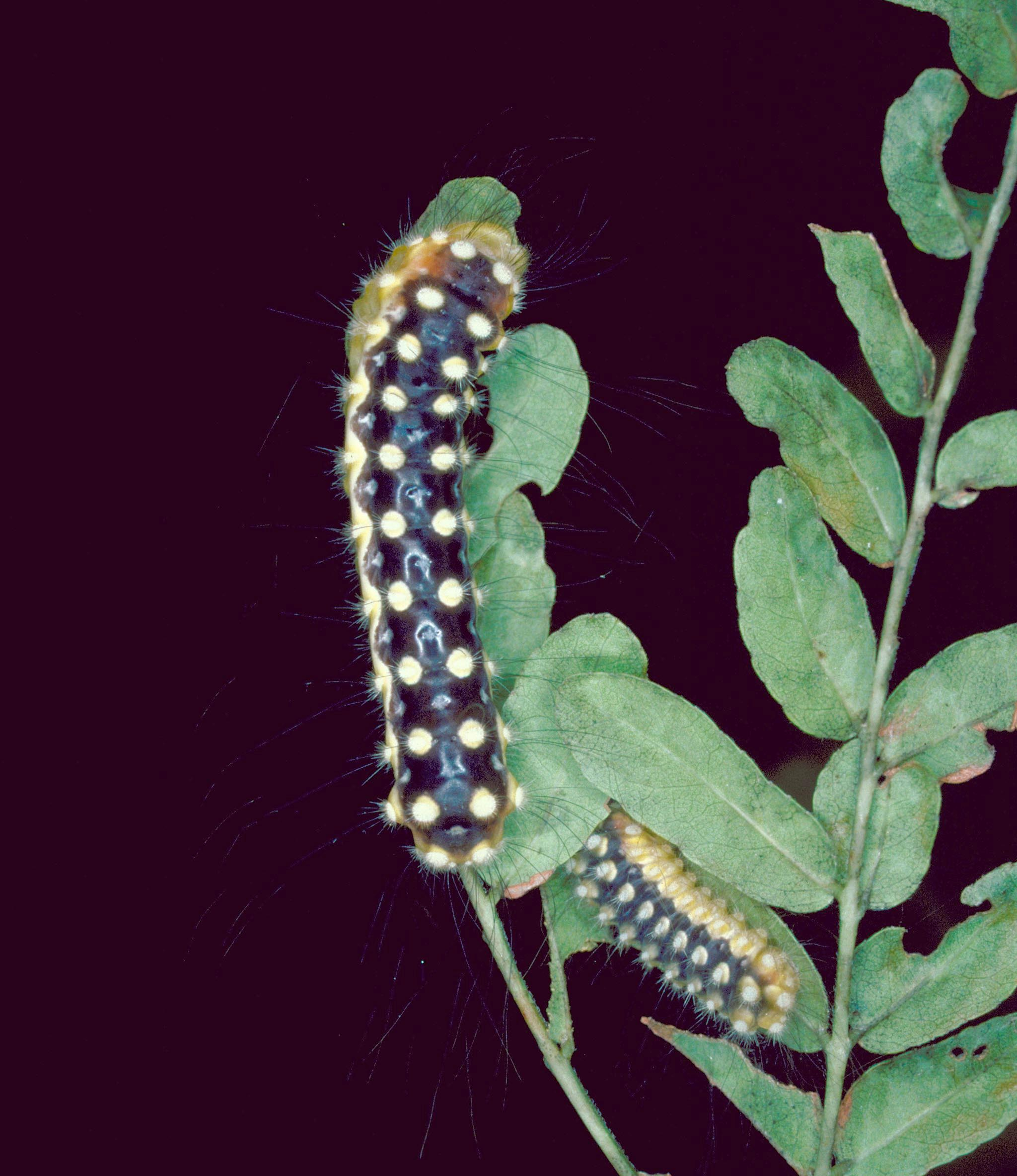
- Norape ovina

Scientific classification
- Kingdom: Animalia
- Phylum: Arthropoda
- Clade: Pancrustacea
- Class: Insecta
- Order: Lepidoptera
- Family: Megalopygidae
- Genus: Norape; Walker, 1855

Synonyms
- Anarchylus Dyar, 1905; Mallotodesma Wallengren, 1858; Sulychra Butler, 1878; Ulosota Grote, 1864; Carama Walker, 1855

= Norape =

Genus of moths

Norape is a genus of moths in the family Megalopygidae. The genus was erected by Francis Walker in 1855.

== Species ==
- Norape acuta Hopp, 1927
- Norape albilineata (Hopp, 1927)
- Norape argyrorrhoea Hübner, 1825
- Norape arietina Hopp, 1927
- Norape beggoides (Dyar, 1910)
- Norape cana (Dognin, 1907)
- Norape capreolata Hopp, 1927
- Norape caprina Hopp, 1927
- Norape catharus Dyar, 1910
- Norape cingulata E. D. Jones, 1921
- Norape consolida Hopp, 1927
- Norape cornuta Hopp, 1927
- Norape cretacea (Hopp, 1922)
- Norape damana Hopp, 1930
- Norape discrepans (Wallengren, 1860)
- Norape draudti Hopp, 1927
- Norape dyarensis Hopp, 1929
- Norape foliata Hopp, 1927
- Norape fuscoapicata Dognin, 1924
- Norape glabra Hopp, 1927
- Norape hadaca Dyar, 1910
- Norape incolorata (E. D. Jones, 1921)
- Norape insinuata Hopp, 1927
- Norape isabela Hopp, 1935
- Norape jaramillo (Dognin, 1890)
- Norape jordani Hopp, 1927
- Norape flavescens Dognin, 1914
- Norape laticosta (Dyar, 1899)
- Norape mexicana (Schaus, 1892)
- Norape miasma Dyar, 1910
- Norape miasmoides Hopp, 1927
- Norape muelleri Hopp, 1927
- Norape nevermanni Hopp, 1927
- Norape nigrovenosa (Druce, 1906)
- Norape obtusa Hopp, 1927
- Norape ovina (Sepp, 1852)
- Norape pampana Hopp, 1927
- Norape plumosa (Butler, 1877)
  - Norape plumosa angustior Hopp, 1927
  - Norape plumosa biacuta Hopp, 1927
- Norape puella Walker, 1855
- Norape rothschildi Hopp, 1927
- Norape schausi Hopp, 1927
- Norape tamsi Hopp, 1927
- Norape taurina Hopp, 1927
- Norape tener (Druce, 1897)
- Norape testudinalis Hopp, 1929
- Norape tosca Hopp, 1927
- Norape truncata Hopp, 1927
  - Norape truncata cavata Hopp, 1927
  - Norape truncata hastata Hopp, 1927
- Norape undulata E. D. Jones, 1912
- Norape variabilis Hopp, 1927
- Norape venata Schaus, 1900
- Norape vesta (Schaus, 1892)
- Norape virgo (Butler, 1877)
- Norape walkeri (Butler, 1877)
- Norape xantholopha Dyar, 1914
  - Norape xantholopha major Hopp, 1927
  - Norape xantholopha minor Hopp, 1927
- Norape zikaniana Hopp, 1927
