= Microcladia =

Scientific classification
- Kingdom: Animalia
- Phylum: Arthropoda
- Clade: Pancrustacea
- Class: Insecta
- Order: Lepidoptera
- Family: Megalopygidae
- Genus: Microcladia; Hopp, 1927

Genus of moths

Microcladia is a genus of moths in the family Megalopygidae.

== Species ==
- Microcladia pusilla Hopp, 1927
- Microcladia pygmaea Hopp, 1927
