= Coamorpha =

Scientific classification
- Kingdom: Animalia
- Phylum: Arthropoda
- Clade: Pancrustacea
- Class: Insecta
- Order: Lepidoptera
- Superfamily: Zygaenoidea
- Family: Megalopygidae
- Genus: Coamorpha; Dyar, 1913

Genus of moths

Coamorpha is a genus of moths in the family Megalopygidae. It has neotropical distribution in Central America.

== Species ==
There are two species:

- Coamorpha glutina (Schaus, 1920) – Guatemala
- Coamorpha innoxia (Schaus, 1910) – Costa Rica
