= Malmella =

Scientific classification
- Kingdom: Animalia
- Phylum: Arthropoda
- Clade: Pancrustacea
- Class: Insecta
- Order: Lepidoptera
- Family: Megalopygidae
- Genus: Malmella; Dognin, 1914

Genus of moths

Malmella is a genus of moths in the family Megalopygidae described by Paul Dognin in 1914.

== Species ==
- Malmella nigricollis Hopp, 1927
- Malmella strigiprima Dognin, 1914
