= Cephalocladia =

Scientific classification
- Kingdom: Animalia
- Phylum: Arthropoda
- Clade: Pancrustacea
- Class: Insecta
- Order: Lepidoptera
- Family: Megalopygidae
- Genus: Cephalocladia; Hopp, 1927

Genus of insects

Cephalocladia is a genus of moths in the family Megalopygidae.

== Species ==
- Cephalocladia fulvicornis (Dognin, 1923)
- Cephalocladia mossi Hopp, 1927
- Cephalocladia werneri Hopp, 1927
