= Repnoa =

Scientific classification
- Kingdom: Animalia
- Phylum: Arthropoda
- Clade: Pancrustacea
- Class: Insecta
- Order: Lepidoptera
- Family: Megalopygidae
- Genus: Repnoa; Dyar, 1910
- Species: R. imparilis

Binomial name
- Repnoa imparilis (Schaus, 1905)

Synonyms
- Praenorape Hopp, 1927; Carama imparilis Schaus, 1905

Genus of moths

Repnoa is a genus of moths in the family Megalopygidae. It contains only one species, Repnoa imparilis, which is found in French Guiana.

The wingspan is about 24 millimetres (0.94 in). The antennae are ochreous and the palpi and frons blackisli brown. There are white hairs at the base of the antennae. The vertex is pale yellow and the collar and thorax are dark grey. The patagia is white and the abdomen is brown, black above, whitish underneath. There is a subdorsal patch at the base, and pale yellow anal hairs. The forewings are grey, with the costa, veins and fringe white and with a faint whitish shade from the cell at vein 2 to the inner margin. The hindwings are darker grey, with the fringe white and with a whitish spot at the end of the cell.

== Subspecies ==
- Repnoa imparilis imparilis
- Repnoa imparilis alba Hopp, 1927
