= Eochroma =

Scientific classification
- Kingdom: Animalia
- Phylum: Arthropoda
- Clade: Pancrustacea
- Class: Insecta
- Order: Lepidoptera
- Family: Megalopygidae
- Genus: Eochroma; Clench, 1956
- Species: E. pulchella

Binomial name
- Eochroma pulchella (Schaus, 1905)

Synonyms
- Trosia pulchella Schaus, 1905

Genus of moths

Eochroma is a genus of moths in the family Megalopygidae. It contains only one species, Eochroma pulchella, which is found in French Guiana.

The wingspan is about 29 mm. The forewings are ochreous, shading to brown and then olivaceous grey terminally. There is a black streak in the cell below the subcostal followed by a roseate patch. The hindwings are reddish ochreous, with the outer margin broadly smoky black from vein 2 to the apex, underneath reddish ochreous. The outer margins are broadly smoky black.
