= Norapella =

Scientific classification
- Kingdom: Animalia
- Phylum: Arthropoda
- Clade: Pancrustacea
- Class: Insecta
- Order: Lepidoptera
- Family: Megalopygidae
- Genus: Norapella; Hopp, 1927

Genus of moths

Norapella is a genus of moths in the family Megalopygidae.

== Species ==
- Norapella bipennis Hopp, 1930
- Norapella gracilis (Dognin)
- Norapella parva (Schaus, 1896)
- Norapella rhadina Dognin, 1914
