= Endobrachys =

Scientific classification
- Kingdom: Animalia
- Phylum: Arthropoda
- Clade: Pancrustacea
- Class: Insecta
- Order: Lepidoptera
- Family: Megalopygidae
- Genus: Endobrachys; Felder, 1874
- Species: E. revocans

Binomial name
- Endobrachys revocans Felder, 1874

Synonyms
- Sciathos arpi Schaus, 1900; Trosia revocans; Trosia caramia Dyar, 1910; Edebessa ferugina E. D. Jones, 1912; Edebessa feruginia; Trosia jeanette Dyar, 1910

Genus of moths

Endobrachys is a monotypic genus of moths in the family Megalopygidae. It contains only one species, Endobrachys revocans, which is found in Peru, French Guiana and Brazil.

The wingspan is about 37 mm for males and 50 mm for females. The forewings are fuscous with the base pinkish white followed by a suffused band of orange rapidly fading into the fuscous colour. The costal area is orange at the base, shading to yellowish grey at the apex. An orange fascia runs through the lower half of the cell, extending to the apex, diffused beyond the cell and there is a dark space on the terminal area below the apex. The termen is narrowly dark cream-colour from near the tornus to vein 5 and the inner margin is suffused with orange. The hindwings are fuscous, with the base rose pink and the inner half of the wing, the costa and inner margin orange.
