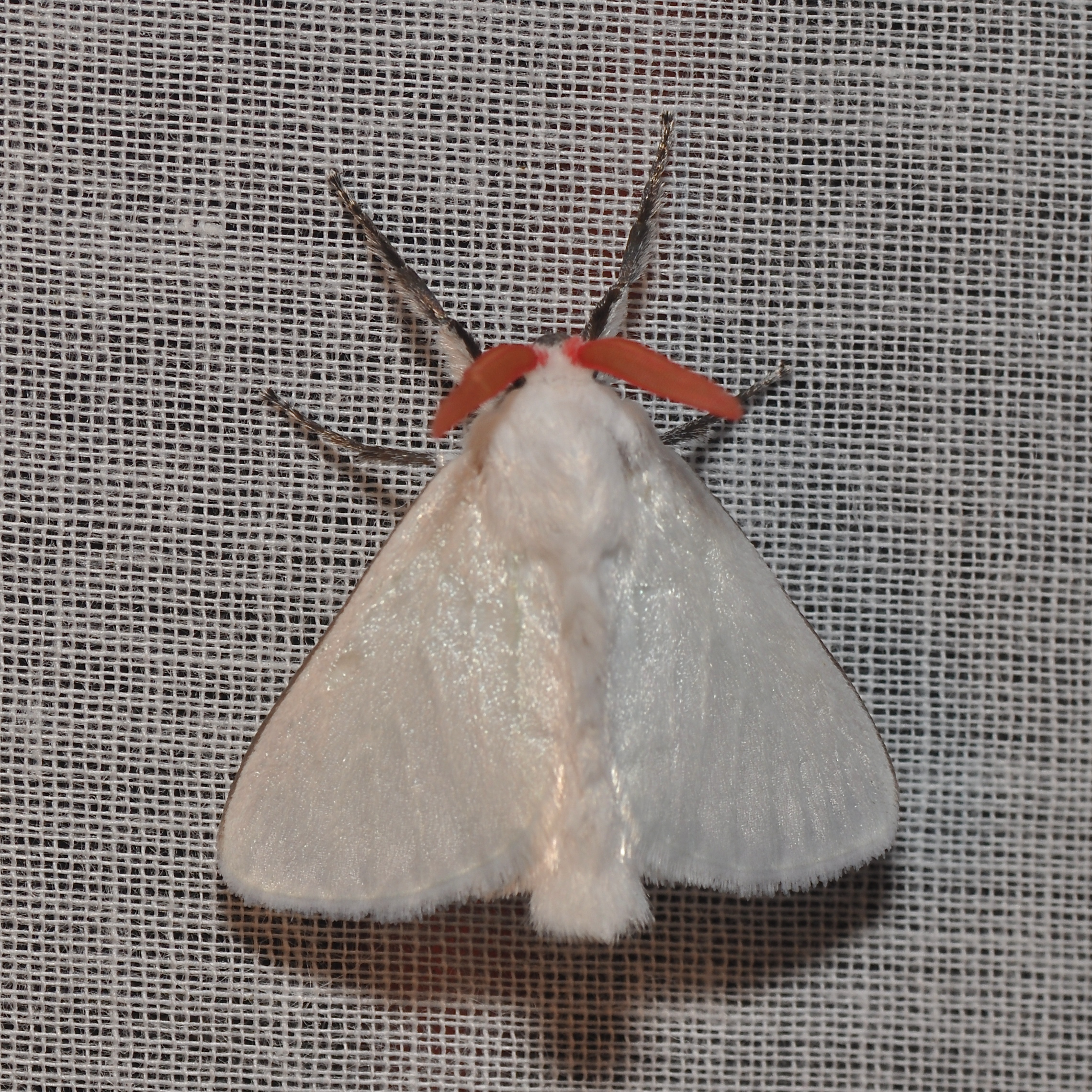
- Aithorape roseicornis

Scientific classification
- Kingdom: Animalia
- Phylum: Arthropoda
- Clade: Pancrustacea
- Class: Insecta
- Order: Lepidoptera
- Family: Megalopygidae
- Genus: Aithorape; Hopp, 1927

= Aithorape =

Genus of moths

Aithorape is a genus of moths in the family Megalopygidae.

== Species ==
- Aithorape albicostata Hopp, 1927
- Aithorape analis Hopp, 1930
- Aithorape candelabraria Hopp, 1927
- Aithorape flammicornis (Schaus, 1905)
- Aithorape frontalis (Schaus, 1920)
- Aithorape longanella Hopp, 1927
- Aithorape roseicornis (Dognin, 1899)
- Aithorape spinulata Hopp, 1927
