= Psychagrapha =

Scientific classification
- Kingdom: Animalia
- Phylum: Arthropoda
- Clade: Pancrustacea
- Class: Insecta
- Order: Lepidoptera
- Family: Megalopygidae
- Genus: Psychagrapha; Walker, 1855

Synonyms
- Psychographa Kirby, 1892

Genus of moths

Psychagrapha is a genus of moths in the family Megalopygidae described by Francis Walker in 1855. The genus was established in the Psychidae, but was transferred to the Megalopygidae by David Stephen Fletcher and I. W. B. Nye in 1982.

== Species ==
- Psychagrapha floccosa Walker, 1855
