= Microrape =

Scientific classification
- Kingdom: Animalia
- Phylum: Arthropoda
- Clade: Pancrustacea
- Class: Insecta
- Order: Lepidoptera
- Family: Megalopygidae
- Genus: Microrape; Dyar, 1910

Genus of moths

Microrape is a genus of moths in the family Megalopygidae.

== Species ==
- Microrape camela Hopp, 1927
- Microrape cristata Hopp, 1927
- Microrape filata Hopp, 1927
- Microrape gnathata Hopp, 1927
- Microrape hippopotama Hopp, 1927
- Microrape jasminatus (Dognin, 1893)
- Microrape minuta (Druce, 1886)
- Microrape nivea (Hopp, 1922)
- Microrape santiago (Hopp, 1922)
- Microrape shilluca Schaus, 1929
- Microrape signata Hopp, 1930
- Microrape simplex Hopp, 1927
