= Hysterocladia =

Scientific classification
- Kingdom: Animalia
- Phylum: Arthropoda
- Clade: Pancrustacea
- Class: Insecta
- Order: Lepidoptera
- Family: Megalopygidae
- Genus: Hysterocladia; Felder, 1874

Genus of moths

Hysterocladia is a genus of moths in the family Megalopygidae.

== Species ==
- Hysterocladia conjuncta Hopp, 1927
- Hysterocladia corallocera Felder, 1874
- Hysterocladia elongata Hopp, 1927
- Hysterocladia eriphua Dognin, 1914
- Hysterocladia ferecostata Hopp, 1927
- Hysterocladia latiunca Hopp, 1927
- Hysterocladia lena (Schaus, 1912)
- Hysterocladia mirabilis (Schaus, 1905)
- Hysterocladia primigenia Hopp, 1927
- Hysterocladia roseicollis Dognin, 1914
  - Hysterocladia roseicollis vicina Hopp, 1927
- Hysterocladia servilis Hopp, 1927
- Hysterocladia tolimensis Hopp, 1927
- Hysterocladia unimana Hopp, 1943
- Hysterocladia werneri Hopp, 1927
