= Macara (moth) =

Scientific classification
- Kingdom: Animalia
- Phylum: Arthropoda
- Clade: Pancrustacea
- Class: Insecta
- Order: Lepidoptera
- Family: Megalopygidae
- Genus: Macara; Dognin, 1911

Genus of moths

Macara is a genus of moths in the family Megalopygidae.

== Species ==
- Macara alydda (Druce, 1887)
  - Macara alydda nigella (Dognin, 1916)
- Macara argentea (Druce, 1897)
- Macara dyari Dognin, 1914
- Macara heinrichi Hopp, 1928
- Macara interpunctosa Dognin, 1914
- Macara nigripes (Dyar, 1909)
- Macara pasaleuca (Maassen, 1899)
- Macara purens (Schaus, 1905)
- Macara terena Dognin, 1914
