= Vescoa =

Scientific classification
- Kingdom: Animalia
- Phylum: Arthropoda
- Clade: Pancrustacea
- Class: Insecta
- Order: Lepidoptera
- Family: Megalopygidae
- Genus: Vescoa; Dyar, 1910
- Species: V. ma

Binomial name
- Vescoa ma Dyar, 1910

Genus of moths

Vescoa is a genus of moths in the family Megalopygidae. It contains only one species, Vescoa ma, which is found in Peru.

The wingspan is about 15 mm. The forewings are dark grey, with all the veins, the fringe, and inner margin narrowly white. The hindwings are white with grey streaks between the veins outwardly.
