= Norape walkeri =

Scientific classification
- Kingdom: Animalia
- Phylum: Arthropoda
- Clade: Pancrustacea
- Class: Insecta
- Order: Lepidoptera
- Family: Megalopygidae
- Genus: Norape
- Species: N. walkeri

Binomial name
- Norape walkeri (Butler, 1877)

Synonyms
- Carama walkeri Butler, 1877

Species of moth

Norape walkeri is a moth of the Megalopygidae family. It was described by Arthur Gardiner Butler in 1877. It is found from Mexico to the Amazon region.
