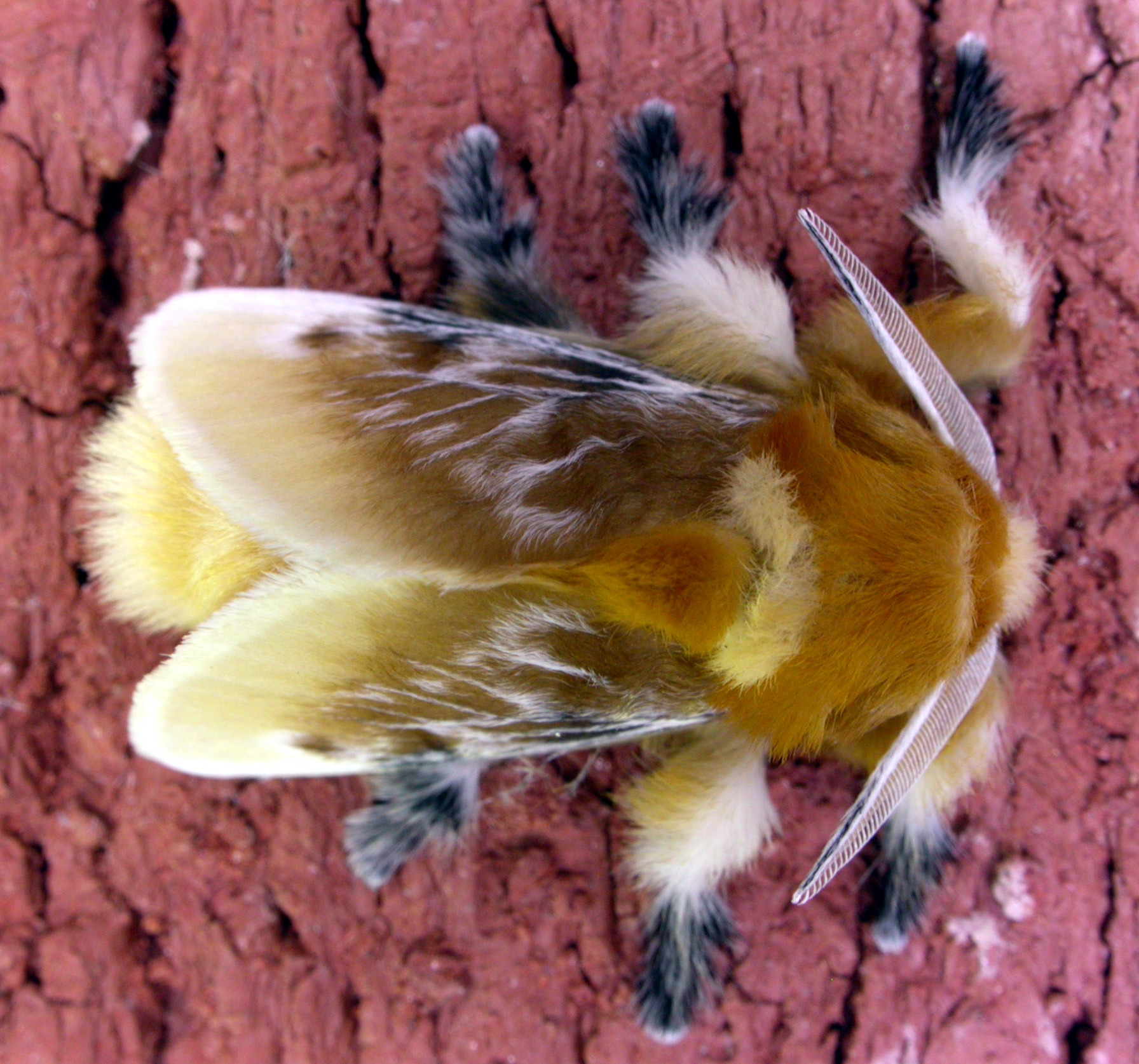
- Megalopyge opercularis

Scientific classification
- Kingdom: Animalia
- Phylum: Arthropoda
- Clade: Pancrustacea
- Class: Insecta
- Order: Lepidoptera
- Superfamily: Zygaenoidea
- Family: Megalopygidae; Herrich-Schäffer, 1855

Genera
- See text

= Flannel moth =

Family of moths

The flannel moths or crinkled flannel moths (scientific name Megalopygidae) are a family of insects.

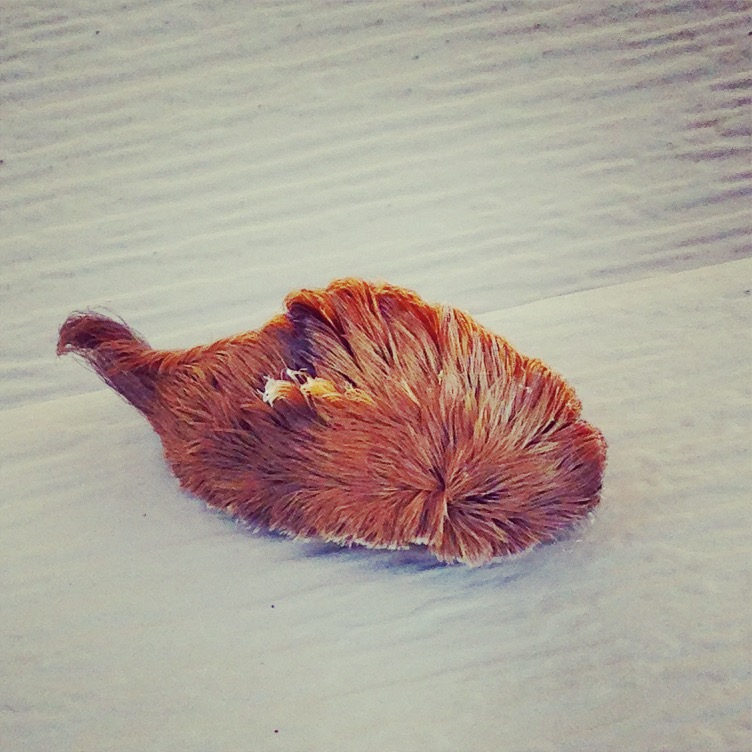
A Megalopyge opercularis caterpillar on Kent Island, Maryland: a highly toxic species

== Distribution and habitat ==
Species of ‘‘Megalopyge’’ occur throughout the Neotropical region, from Mexico through Central America and much of South America to Argentina, where the genus reaches its greatest diversity. Approximately 236 species have been recorded within this range. A smaller number extend north of Mexico, with about 11 species documented in the United States and Canada. The family Megalopygidae is restricted to the New World. In Florida, five species of the family have been recorded: three in the genus ‘‘Lagoa’’ and one species each in ‘‘Megalopyge’’ and ‘‘Norape’’.

== Life cycle and behavior ==
Adult flannel moths are stout-bodied, and very hairy. Females have thin antennae while males' are feather-like. Larvae are called puss caterpillars and, with their long hairs, resemble cotton balls. They are eaten by green lacewing insects and the Anolis lizards. They have venomous spines that can cause a painful sting and inflammation lasting for several days. In some cases, the sting may cause headache, nausea, and shock-like symptoms. Perhaps the most notorious for stinging is the caterpillar of Megalopyge opercularis. Caterpillars have seven pairs of prolegs, while other Lepidopterae have five or fewer pairs. They feed on a wide variety of deciduous trees and shrubs.

== Genera ==
- Aithorape
- Cephalocladia
- Coamorpha
- Edebessa
- Endobrachys
- Eochroma
- Hysterocladia
- Macara
- Malmella
- Megalopyge
- Mesoscia
- Microcladia
- Microrape
- Norape
- Norapella
- Podalia
- Proterocladia
- Psychagrapha
- Repnoa
- Thoscora
- Trosia
- Vescoa
- Zyzypyge

== Sources ==
- Natural History Museum genus database
- "Insects of Cedar Creek, Minnesota". cedarcreek.umn.edu. Archived from the original on 2022-04-07.
- BugGuide
- USGS--Caterpillars of Eastern Forests
- Auburn University
- Moths of Borneo—lists the family as neotropical
- Virginia Tech Cooperative Extension
- Ohio State University
