= Araeomolis albipicta =

Scientific classification
- Domain: Eukaryota
- Kingdom: Animalia
- Phylum: Arthropoda
- Class: Insecta
- Order: Lepidoptera
- Superfamily: Noctuoidea
- Family: Erebidae
- Subfamily: Arctiinae
- Genus: Araeomolis
- Species: A. albipicta

Binomial name
- Araeomolis albipicta (Dognin, 1909)

Synonyms
- Aphyle albipicta Dognin, 1909

Species of moth

Araeomolis albipicta is a moth of the family Erebidae. It was described by Paul Dognin in 1909, originally under the genus Aphyle. It is found in French Guiana, Colombia and the Brazilian state of Amazonas.
