= Araeomolis irregularis =

Scientific classification
- Domain: Eukaryota
- Kingdom: Animalia
- Phylum: Arthropoda
- Class: Insecta
- Order: Lepidoptera
- Superfamily: Noctuoidea
- Family: Erebidae
- Subfamily: Arctiinae
- Genus: Araeomolis
- Species: A. irregularis

Binomial name
- Araeomolis irregularis (Rothschild, 1909)

Synonyms
- Idalus irregularis Rothschild, 1909

Species of moth

Araeomolis irregularis is a moth of the family Erebidae. It was described by Walter Rothschild in 1909, originally under the genus Idalus. It is found in French Guiana and the Brazilian state of Amazonas.
