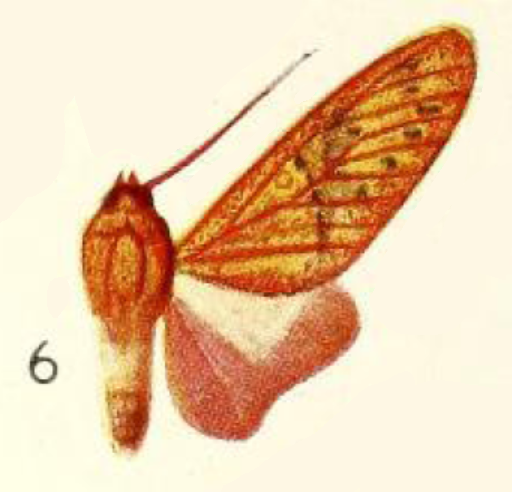

Scientific classification
- Domain: Eukaryota
- Kingdom: Animalia
- Phylum: Arthropoda
- Class: Insecta
- Order: Lepidoptera
- Superfamily: Noctuoidea
- Family: Erebidae
- Subfamily: Arctiinae
- Genus: Eriostepta
- Species: E. nigripuncta

Binomial name
- Eriostepta nigripuncta (Joicey & Talbot, 1918)

Synonyms
- Araeomolis nigripuncta Joicey & Talbot, 1918

= Eriostepta nigripuncta =

Species of moth

Eriostepta nigripuncta is a moth of the family Erebidae. It was described by James John Joicey and George Talbot in 1918, originally under the genus Araeomolis. It is found in French Guiana, Peru and Bolivia.
