= Eriostepta sanguinea =

Scientific classification
- Kingdom: Animalia
- Phylum: Arthropoda
- Class: Insecta
- Order: Lepidoptera
- Superfamily: Noctuoidea
- Family: Erebidae
- Subfamily: Arctiinae
- Genus: Eriostepta
- Species: E. sanguinea

Binomial name
- Eriostepta sanguinea (Hampson, 1905)

Synonyms
- Araeomolis sanguinea Hampson, 1905

Species of moth

Eriostepta sanguinea is a moth of the family Erebidae. It was described by British entomologist George Hampson in 1905, originally under the genus Araeomolis; Hervé de Toulgoët transferred it to Eriostepta in 1993. It is found in French Guiana, Guyana, Peru, and the Brazilian state of Amazonas.
