= Idalus admirabilis =

Scientific classification
- Domain: Eukaryota
- Kingdom: Animalia
- Phylum: Arthropoda
- Class: Insecta
- Order: Lepidoptera
- Superfamily: Noctuoidea
- Family: Erebidae
- Subfamily: Arctiinae
- Genus: Idalus
- Species: I. admirabilis

Binomial name
- Idalus admirabilis (Cramer, [1777])

Synonyms
- Phalaena admirabilis Cramer, [1777]

Species of moth

Idalus admirabilis is a moth of the family Erebidae. It was described by Pieter Cramer in 1777. It is found in Suriname, Trinidad, Brazil (Amazonas, Santa Catarina), French Guiana and Ecuador.
