= Idalus delicata =

Scientific classification
- Domain: Eukaryota
- Kingdom: Animalia
- Phylum: Arthropoda
- Class: Insecta
- Order: Lepidoptera
- Superfamily: Noctuoidea
- Family: Erebidae
- Subfamily: Arctiinae
- Genus: Idalus
- Species: I. delicata

Binomial name
- Idalus delicata Möschler, 1886

Species of moth

Idalus delicata is a moth of the family Erebidae. It was described by Heinrich Benno Möschler in 1886. It is found on Jamaica.
