= Idalus pichesensis =

Scientific classification
- Kingdom: Animalia
- Phylum: Arthropoda
- Class: Insecta
- Order: Lepidoptera
- Superfamily: Noctuoidea
- Family: Erebidae
- Subfamily: Arctiinae
- Genus: Idalus
- Species: I. pichesensis

Binomial name
- Idalus pichesensis Dyar, 1898

Synonyms
- Automolis coacta Dognin, 1902

Species of moth

Idalus pichesensis is a moth of the family Erebidae. It was described by Harrison Gray Dyar Jr. in 1898. It is found in Peru and Brazil.
