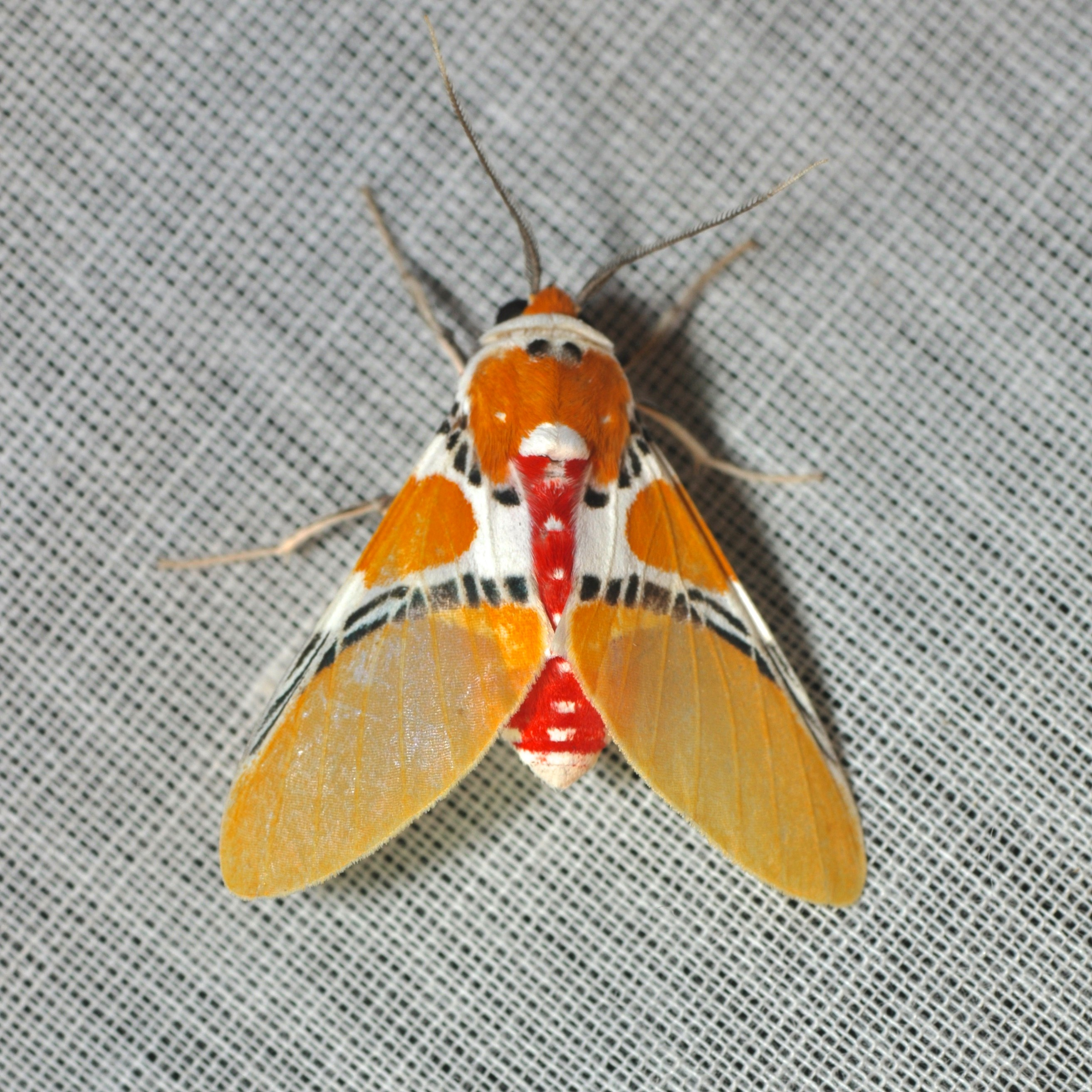

Scientific classification
- Domain: Eukaryota
- Kingdom: Animalia
- Phylum: Arthropoda
- Class: Insecta
- Order: Lepidoptera
- Superfamily: Noctuoidea
- Family: Erebidae
- Subfamily: Arctiinae
- Genus: Idalus
- Species: I. herois

Binomial name
- Idalus herois Schaus, 1889

= Idalus herois =

Species of moth

The Clown Face Tiger Moth (Idalus herois) is a moth of the family Erebidae. It was described by William Schaus in 1889. It is found in Mexico, Venezuela and Brazil.
