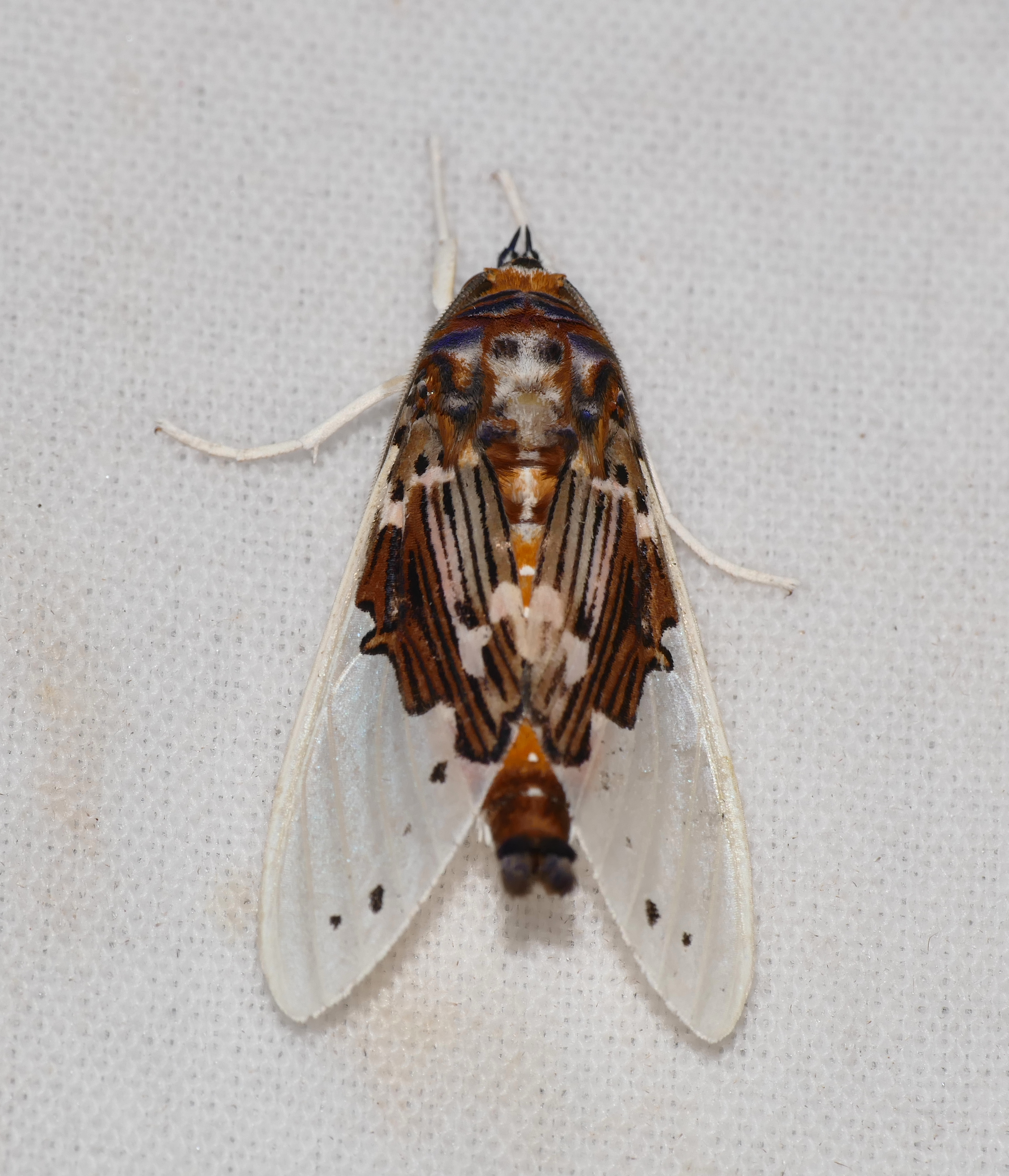
- Arctiid Moth (Idalus vitrea)

Scientific classification
- Domain: Eukaryota
- Kingdom: Animalia
- Phylum: Arthropoda
- Class: Insecta
- Order: Lepidoptera
- Superfamily: Noctuoidea
- Family: Erebidae
- Subfamily: Arctiinae
- Genus: Idalus
- Species: I. vitrea

Binomial name
- Idalus vitrea (Cramer, [1780])

Synonyms
- Bombyx vitrea Cramer, [1780]; Automolis vitrea meridionalis Rothschild, 1909; Automolis vitrea borealis Rothschild, 1909; Automolis vitrea occidentalis Rothschild, 1909

= Idalus vitrea =

Species of moth

Idalus vitrea is a moth of the family Erebidae. It was described by Pieter Cramer in 1780. It is found in Mexico, Guatemala, Honduras, Costa Rica, Panama, Paraguay, Peru, French Guiana, Bolivia, Brazil, and Venezuela.

== Subspecies ==
- Idalus vitrea vitrea (French Guiana, Brazil, Venezuela, Bolivia, Panama, Costa Rica, Guatemala, Honduras, Mexico)
- Idalus vitrea borealis (Rothschild, 1909) (Mexico, Guatemala, Costa Rica, Honduras)
- Idalus vitrea meridionalis (Rothschild, 1909) (Paraguay)
- Idalus vitrea occidentalis (Rothschild, 1909) (Peru)
