= Idalus idalia =

Scientific classification
- Kingdom: Animalia
- Phylum: Arthropoda
- Class: Insecta
- Order: Lepidoptera
- Superfamily: Noctuoidea
- Family: Erebidae
- Subfamily: Arctiinae
- Genus: Idalus
- Species: I. idalia

Binomial name
- Idalus idalia (Hampson, 1901)

Synonyms
- Automolis idalia Hampson, 1901

Species of moth

Idalus idalia is a moth of the family Erebidae. It was described by George Hampson in 1901. It is found in Brazil.
