= Araeomolis propinqua =

Scientific classification
- Kingdom: Animalia
- Phylum: Arthropoda
- Class: Insecta
- Order: Lepidoptera
- Superfamily: Noctuoidea
- Family: Erebidae
- Subfamily: Arctiinae
- Genus: Araeomolis
- Species: A. propinqua

Binomial name
- Araeomolis propinqua Toulgoët, 1998

Species of moth

Araeomolis propinqua is a moth of the family Erebidae. It was described by French entomologist Hervé de Toulgoët in 1998. It is found in French Guiana and Venezuela.
