= Idalus irrupta =

Scientific classification
- Domain: Eukaryota
- Kingdom: Animalia
- Phylum: Arthropoda
- Class: Insecta
- Order: Lepidoptera
- Superfamily: Noctuoidea
- Family: Erebidae
- Subfamily: Arctiinae
- Genus: Idalus
- Species: I. irrupta

Binomial name
- Idalus irrupta (Schaus, 1905)

Synonyms
- Automolis irrupta Schaus, 1905

Species of moth

Idalus irrupta is a moth of the subfamily Arctiinae. It was described by Schaus in 1905. It is found in Guyana.
