= Eriostepta roseireta =

Scientific classification
- Domain: Eukaryota
- Kingdom: Animalia
- Phylum: Arthropoda
- Class: Insecta
- Order: Lepidoptera
- Superfamily: Noctuoidea
- Family: Erebidae
- Subfamily: Arctiinae
- Genus: Eriostepta
- Species: E. roseireta

Binomial name
- Eriostepta roseireta Hampson, 1901

Species of moth

Eriostepta roseireta is a moth of the family Erebidae first described by George Hampson in 1901. It is found in French Guiana, Brazil, and Suriname.
