= Idalus erythronota =

Scientific classification
- Domain: Eukaryota
- Kingdom: Animalia
- Phylum: Arthropoda
- Class: Insecta
- Order: Lepidoptera
- Superfamily: Noctuoidea
- Family: Erebidae
- Subfamily: Arctiinae
- Genus: Idalus
- Species: I. erythronota

Binomial name
- Idalus erythronota (Herrich-Schäffer, [1853])

Synonyms
- Phaegoptera erythronota Herrich-Schäffer, [1853]; Trichromia erythronota; Automolis erythronotus; Automolis erythronota

Species of moth

Idalus erythronota is a moth of the family Erebidae. It was described by Gottlieb August Wilhelm Herrich-Schäffer in 1853. It is found in Venezuela.
