= Eriostepta fulvescens =

Scientific classification
- Domain: Eukaryota
- Kingdom: Animalia
- Phylum: Arthropoda
- Class: Insecta
- Order: Lepidoptera
- Superfamily: Noctuoidea
- Family: Erebidae
- Subfamily: Arctiinae
- Genus: Eriostepta
- Species: E. fulvescens

Binomial name
- Eriostepta fulvescens Rothschild, 1909

Species of moth

Eriostepta fulvescens is a moth of the family Erebidae first described by Walter Rothschild in 1909. It is found in French Guiana, Suriname, the upper Amazon region, Brazil and Bolivia.
