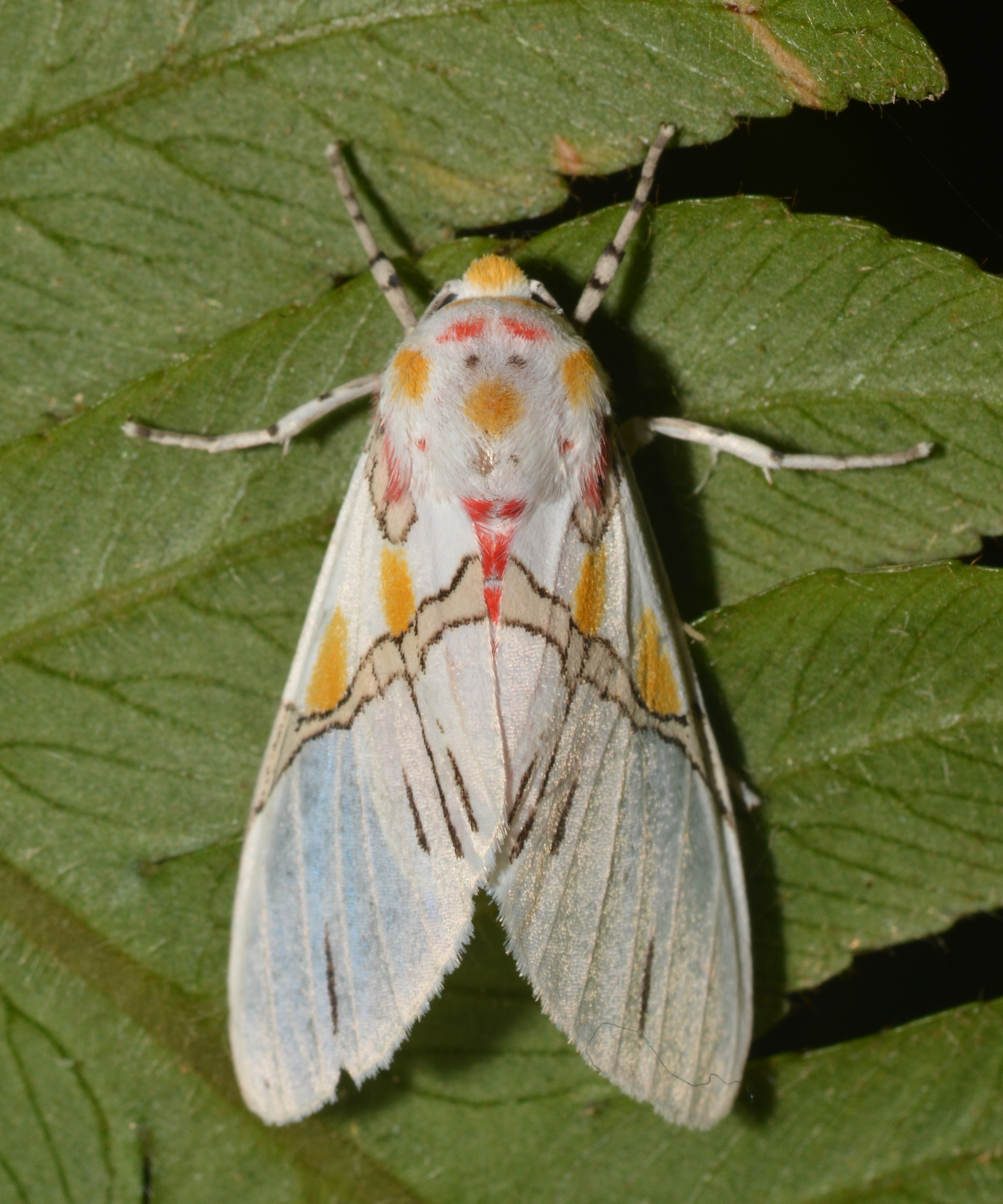
- Idalus crinis

Scientific classification
- Kingdom: Animalia
- Phylum: Arthropoda
- Clade: Pancrustacea
- Class: Insecta
- Order: Lepidoptera
- Superfamily: Noctuoidea
- Family: Erebidae
- Subfamily: Arctiinae
- Genus: Idalus
- Species: I. crinis

Binomial name
- Idalus crinis H. Druce, 1884

= Idalus crinis =

Species of moth

Idalus crinis is a moth of the family Erebidae. It was described by Herbert Druce in 1884. It is found in Mexico and Guatemala.
