= Aphyle steinbachi =

Scientific classification
- Domain: Eukaryota
- Kingdom: Animalia
- Phylum: Arthropoda
- Class: Insecta
- Order: Lepidoptera
- Superfamily: Noctuoidea
- Family: Erebidae
- Subfamily: Arctiinae
- Genus: Aphyle
- Species: A. steinbachi

Binomial name
- Aphyle steinbachi (Rothschild, 1909)

Synonyms
- Neritos steinbachi Rothschild, 1909

Species of moth

Aphyle steinbachi is a moth of the family Erebidae first described by Walter Rothschild in 1909. It found in Bolivia.
