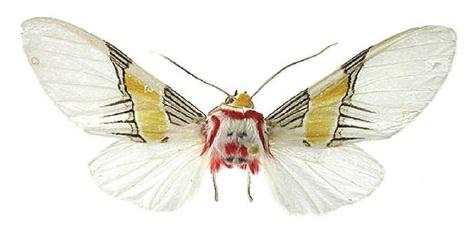
- Female, dorsal view
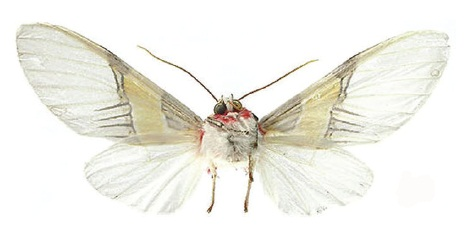
- Female, ventral view

Scientific classification
- Kingdom: Animalia
- Phylum: Arthropoda
- Class: Insecta
- Order: Lepidoptera
- Superfamily: Noctuoidea
- Family: Erebidae
- Subfamily: Arctiinae
- Genus: Idalus
- Species: I. paulae

Binomial name
- Idalus paulae Espinoza, 2013

= Idalus paulae =

Species of moth

Idalus paulae is a moth in the family Erebidae. It is found in the Cordillera Volcanica Central, the Cordillera de Talamanca and the Cordillera Talamanca of Costa Rica. The habitat consists of rain forests and the margins of cloud forests, on both the Pacific and Atlantic slopes at altitudes between 1,400 and 2,230 meters.

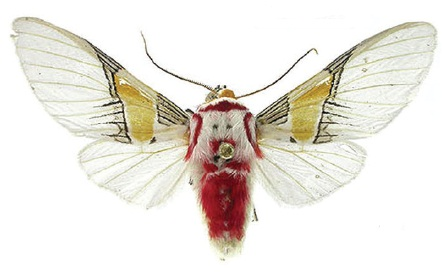
Male, dorsal view

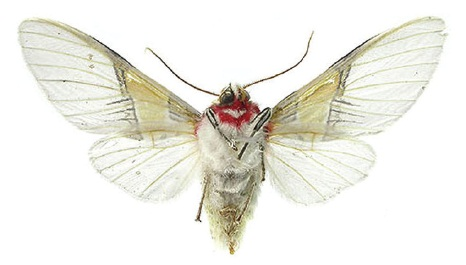
Male, ventral view

The length of the forewings is 20.4 mm. The forewings are semihyaline with a white ground color and a creamy-white triangular basal patch edged with brown and with four fine dark brown longitudinal lines between the costal margin and the anal vein. There is a small brown spot in the postbasal area running to the posterior margin. There is a large yellow-orange patch on the medial area. The hindwings are semihyaline white, expanded in humeral area. Adults are on wing throughout the year.

== Etymology ==
The species is named for Ana Paula Zamora Espinoza, the author’s niece.
