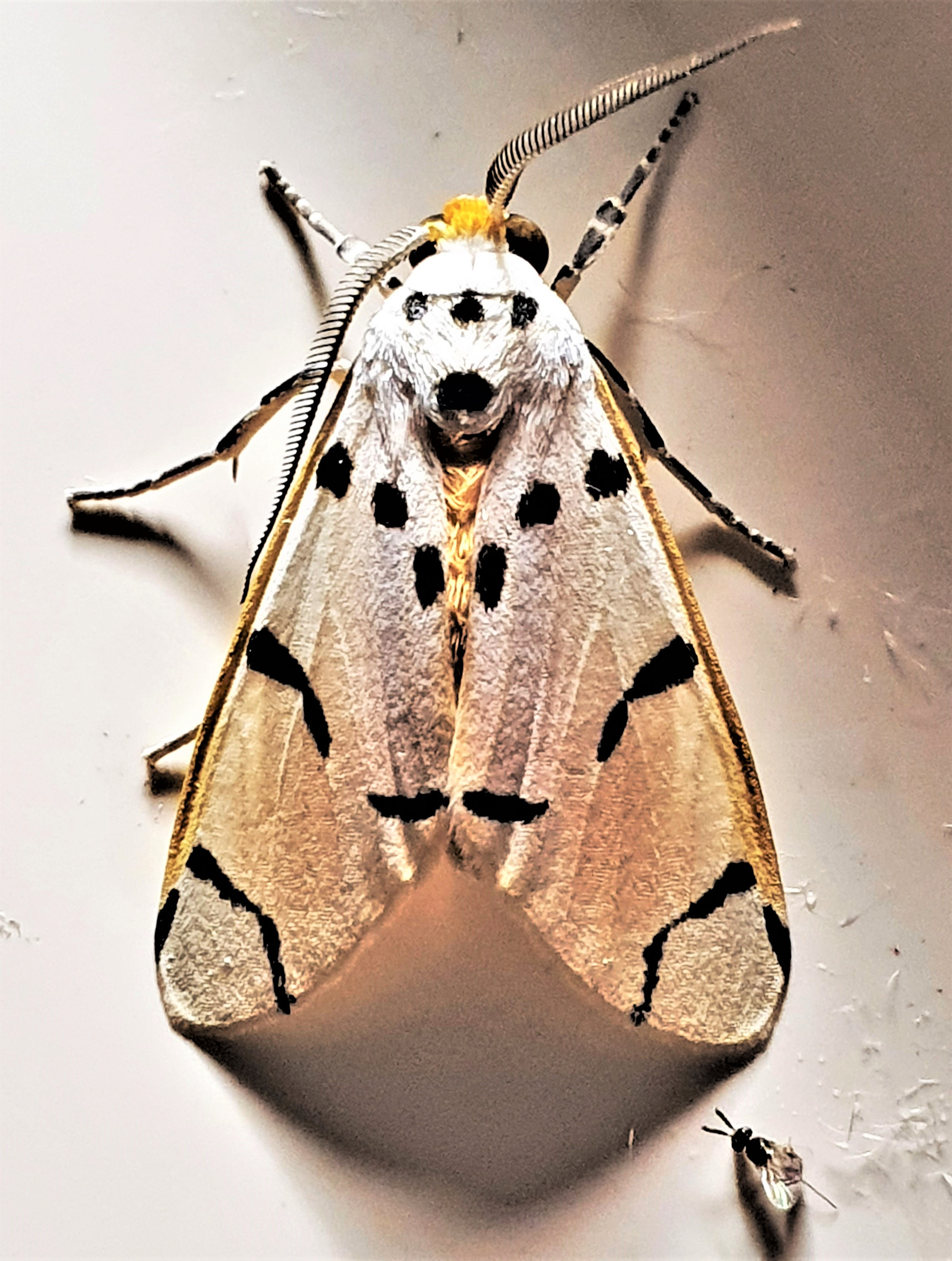
- Adult

Scientific classification
- Kingdom: Animalia
- Phylum: Arthropoda
- Class: Insecta
- Order: Lepidoptera
- Superfamily: Noctuoidea
- Family: Erebidae
- Subfamily: Arctiinae
- Genus: Aphyle
- Species: A. margaritaceus

Binomial name
- Aphyle margaritaceus Walker, 1855

= Aphyle margaritaceus =

Species of moth

Aphyle margaritaceus is a species of moth in the family Erebidae. first described by Francis Walker in 1855. It found in French Guiana, Suriname, Peru and the Brazilian states of Amazonas and Pará.
