= Idalus agricus =

Scientific classification
- Kingdom: Animalia
- Phylum: Arthropoda
- Class: Insecta
- Order: Lepidoptera
- Superfamily: Noctuoidea
- Family: Erebidae
- Subfamily: Arctiinae
- Genus: Idalus
- Species: I. agricus

Binomial name
- Idalus agricus Dyar, 1910

Species of moth

Idalus agricus is a moth of the family Erebidae. It was described by Harrison Gray Dyar Jr. in 1910. It is found in Mexico.
