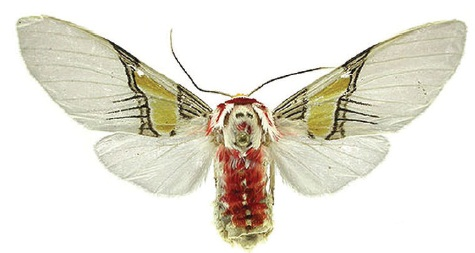
- Female Idalus maesi faustinoi, dorsal view
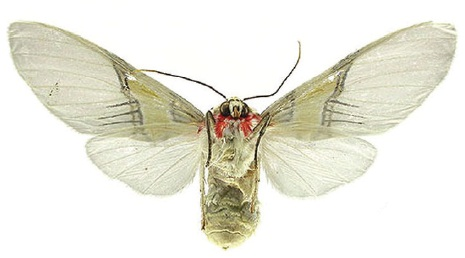
- Female Idalus maesi faustinoi, ventral view

Scientific classification
- Domain: Eukaryota
- Kingdom: Animalia
- Phylum: Arthropoda
- Class: Insecta
- Order: Lepidoptera
- Superfamily: Noctuoidea
- Family: Erebidae
- Subfamily: Arctiinae
- Genus: Idalus
- Species: I. maesi

Binomial name
- Idalus maesi Laguerre, 2006

= Idalus maesi =

Species of moth

Idalus maesi is a moth in the family Erebidae first described by Michel Laguerre in 2006. It is found in Nicaragua, Guatemala and Honduras. The habitat consists of cloud forests at altitudes between 1,444 and 2,133 meters.

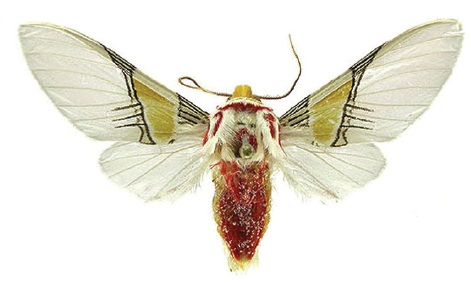
Male Idalus maesi faustinoi, dorsal view

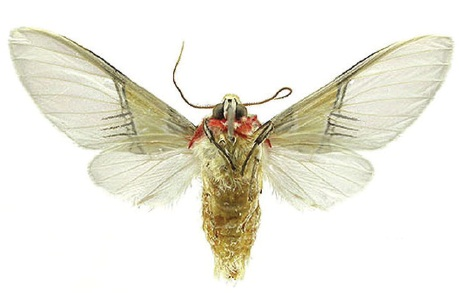
Male Idalus maesi faustinoi, ventral view

== Subspecies ==
- Idalus maesi maesi (Nicaragua)
- Idalus maesi faustinoi Espinoza, 2013 (Guatemala, Honduras)
