= Idalus quadratus =

Scientific classification
- Domain: Eukaryota
- Kingdom: Animalia
- Phylum: Arthropoda
- Class: Insecta
- Order: Lepidoptera
- Superfamily: Noctuoidea
- Family: Erebidae
- Subfamily: Arctiinae
- Genus: Idalus
- Species: I. quadratus

Binomial name
- Idalus quadratus Rothschild, 1933

Species of moth

Idalus quadratus is a moth of the family Erebidae. It was described by Walter Rothschild in 1933. It is found in Brazil.
