= Idalus affinis =

Scientific classification
- Domain: Eukaryota
- Kingdom: Animalia
- Phylum: Arthropoda
- Class: Insecta
- Order: Lepidoptera
- Superfamily: Noctuoidea
- Family: Erebidae
- Subfamily: Arctiinae
- Genus: Idalus
- Species: I. affinis

Binomial name
- Idalus affinis Rothschild, 1917

Species of moth

Idalus affinis is a moth of the family Erebidae. It was described by Rothschild in 1917. It is found in Brazil (Santa Catharina).
