= Idalus dorsalis =

Scientific classification
- Domain: Eukaryota
- Kingdom: Animalia
- Phylum: Arthropoda
- Class: Insecta
- Order: Lepidoptera
- Superfamily: Noctuoidea
- Family: Erebidae
- Subfamily: Arctiinae
- Genus: Idalus
- Species: I. dorsalis

Binomial name
- Idalus dorsalis (Seitz, 1921)

Synonyms
- Automolis dorsalis Seitz, 1921

Species of moth

Idalus dorsalis is a moth of the family Erebidae. It was described by Adalbert Seitz in 1921. It is found in French Guiana and Colombia.
