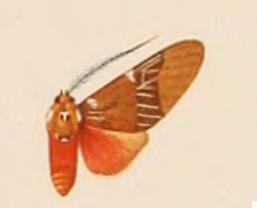

Scientific classification
- Domain: Eukaryota
- Kingdom: Animalia
- Phylum: Arthropoda
- Class: Insecta
- Order: Lepidoptera
- Superfamily: Noctuoidea
- Family: Erebidae
- Subfamily: Arctiinae
- Genus: Idalus
- Species: I. multicolor

Binomial name
- Idalus multicolor (Rothschild, 1909)

Synonyms
- Automolis multicolor Rothschild, 1909

= Idalus multicolor =

Species of moth

Idalus multicolor is a moth of the family Erebidae first described by Walter Rothschild in 1909. It is found in French Guiana and Guyana.
