= Idalus dares =

Scientific classification
- Domain: Eukaryota
- Kingdom: Animalia
- Phylum: Arthropoda
- Class: Insecta
- Order: Lepidoptera
- Superfamily: Noctuoidea
- Family: Erebidae
- Subfamily: Arctiinae
- Genus: Idalus
- Species: I. dares

Binomial name
- Idalus dares H. Druce, 1894

Species of moth

Idalus dares is a moth of the family Erebidae. It was described by Herbert Druce in 1894. It is found in Costa Rica and Colombia.
