= Idalus decisa =

Scientific classification
- Domain: Eukaryota
- Kingdom: Animalia
- Phylum: Arthropoda
- Class: Insecta
- Order: Lepidoptera
- Superfamily: Noctuoidea
- Family: Erebidae
- Subfamily: Arctiinae
- Genus: Idalus
- Species: I. decisa

Binomial name
- Idalus decisa (Rothschild, 1917)

Synonyms
- Automolis decisa Rothschild, 1917

Species of moth

Idalus decisa is a moth of the family Erebidae. It was described by Walter Rothschild in 1917. It is found in French Guiana.
