= Idalus monostidza =

Scientific classification
- Kingdom: Animalia
- Phylum: Arthropoda
- Class: Insecta
- Order: Lepidoptera
- Superfamily: Noctuoidea
- Family: Erebidae
- Subfamily: Arctiinae
- Genus: Idalus
- Species: I. monostidza

Binomial name
- Idalus monostidza (Hampson, 1916)

Synonyms
- Automolis monostidza Hampson, 1916

Species of moth

Idalus monostidza is a moth of the family Erebidae. It was described by George Hampson in 1916. It is found in Peru.
