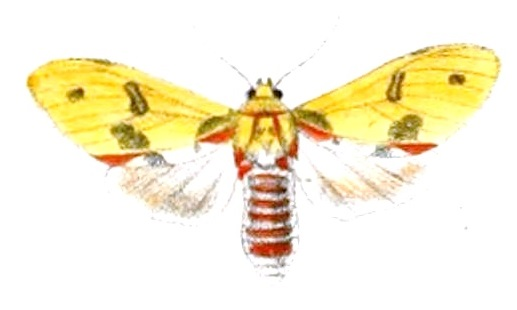

Scientific classification
- Domain: Eukaryota
- Kingdom: Animalia
- Phylum: Arthropoda
- Class: Insecta
- Order: Lepidoptera
- Superfamily: Noctuoidea
- Family: Erebidae
- Subfamily: Arctiinae
- Genus: Idalus
- Species: I. citrina

Binomial name
- Idalus citrina H. Druce, 1890

= Idalus citrina =

Species of moth

Idalus citrina is a moth of the family Erebidae. It was described by Herbert Druce in 1890. It is found in Venezuela and Brazil.
