= Idalus veneta =

Scientific classification
- Domain: Eukaryota
- Kingdom: Animalia
- Phylum: Arthropoda
- Class: Insecta
- Order: Lepidoptera
- Superfamily: Noctuoidea
- Family: Erebidae
- Subfamily: Arctiinae
- Genus: Idalus
- Species: I. veneta

Binomial name
- Idalus veneta Dognin, 1901

Synonyms
- Idalus f. obscura Gaede, 1928

Species of moth

Idalus veneta is a moth of the subfamily Arctiinae. It was described by Paul Dognin in 1901. It is found in Colombia and Venezuela.
