= Idalus iragorri =

Scientific classification
- Kingdom: Animalia
- Phylum: Arthropoda
- Class: Insecta
- Order: Lepidoptera
- Superfamily: Noctuoidea
- Family: Erebidae
- Subfamily: Arctiinae
- Genus: Idalus
- Species: I. iragorri

Binomial name
- Idalus iragorri (Dognin, 1902)

Synonyms
- Automolis iragorri Dognin, 1902

Species of moth

Idalus iragorri is a moth of the family Erebidae. It was described by Paul Dognin in 1902. It is found in Venezuela.
