= Idalus tenuifascia =

Scientific classification
- Kingdom: Animalia
- Phylum: Arthropoda
- Clade: Pancrustacea
- Class: Insecta
- Order: Lepidoptera
- Superfamily: Noctuoidea
- Family: Erebidae
- Subfamily: Arctiinae
- Genus: Idalus
- Species: I. tenuifascia

Binomial name
- Idalus tenuifascia (Dognin, 1911)

Synonyms
- Automolis tenuifascia Dognin, 1911

Species of moth

Idalus tenuifascia is a moth of the family Erebidae. It was described by Paul Dognin in 1911. It is found in Colombia.
