= Idalus daga =

Scientific classification
- Domain: Eukaryota
- Kingdom: Animalia
- Phylum: Arthropoda
- Class: Insecta
- Order: Lepidoptera
- Superfamily: Noctuoidea
- Family: Erebidae
- Subfamily: Arctiinae
- Genus: Idalus
- Species: I. daga

Binomial name
- Idalus daga (Dognin, 1891)

Synonyms
- Empusa daga Dognin, 1891

Species of moth

Idalus daga is a moth of the family Erebidae. It was described by Paul Dognin in 1891. It is found in French Guiana, Venezuela, Ecuador, Peru, Brazil and Bolivia.
