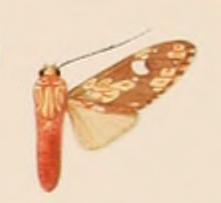

Scientific classification
- Domain: Eukaryota
- Kingdom: Animalia
- Phylum: Arthropoda
- Class: Insecta
- Order: Lepidoptera
- Superfamily: Noctuoidea
- Family: Erebidae
- Subfamily: Arctiinae
- Genus: Araeomolis
- Species: A. persimilis

Binomial name
- Araeomolis persimilis Rothschild, 1909

= Araeomolis persimilis =

Species of moth

Araeomolis persimilis is a moth of the family Erebidae first described by Walter Rothschild in 1909. It is found in Brazil and Peru.
