= Idalus ochreata =

Scientific classification
- Domain: Eukaryota
- Kingdom: Animalia
- Phylum: Arthropoda
- Class: Insecta
- Order: Lepidoptera
- Superfamily: Noctuoidea
- Family: Erebidae
- Subfamily: Arctiinae
- Genus: Idalus
- Species: I. ochreata

Binomial name
- Idalus ochreata (Schaus, 1905)

Synonyms
- Automolis ochreata Schaus, 1905

Species of moth

Idalus ochreata is a moth of the family Erebidae. It was described by William Schaus in 1905. It is found in French Guiana, Suriname and Venezuela.
