= Idalus tybris =

Scientific classification
- Domain: Eukaryota
- Kingdom: Animalia
- Phylum: Arthropoda
- Class: Insecta
- Order: Lepidoptera
- Superfamily: Noctuoidea
- Family: Erebidae
- Subfamily: Arctiinae
- Genus: Idalus
- Species: I. tybris

Binomial name
- Idalus tybris (Cramer, [1776])

Synonyms
- Phalaena tybris Cramer, [1776]; Automolis troias Druce, 1903; Empusa tybris

Species of moth

Idalus tybris is a moth of the family Erebidae. It was described by Pieter Cramer in 1776. It is found in Brazil.
