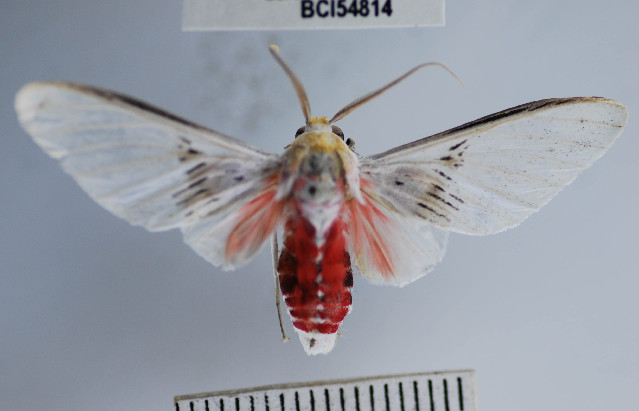

Scientific classification
- Domain: Eukaryota
- Kingdom: Animalia
- Phylum: Arthropoda
- Class: Insecta
- Order: Lepidoptera
- Superfamily: Noctuoidea
- Family: Erebidae
- Subfamily: Arctiinae
- Genus: Idalus
- Species: I. aleteria

Binomial name
- Idalus aleteria (Schaus, 1905)

Synonyms
- Automolis aleteria Schaus, 1905; Automolis aletis Schaus, 1910

= Idalus aleteria =

Species of moth

Idalus aleteria is a moth of the family Erebidae. It was described by William Schaus in 1905. It is found in Costa Rica, French Guiana, Guyana, Peru, Bolivia and Trinidad.
