= Idalus ortus =

Scientific classification
- Domain: Eukaryota
- Kingdom: Animalia
- Phylum: Arthropoda
- Class: Insecta
- Order: Lepidoptera
- Superfamily: Noctuoidea
- Family: Erebidae
- Subfamily: Arctiinae
- Genus: Idalus
- Species: I. ortus

Binomial name
- Idalus ortus Schaus, 1892

Species of moth

Idalus ortus is a moth of the family Erebidae. It was described by William Schaus in 1892. It is found in Venezuela and Brazil.
