= Idalus fasciipuncta =

Scientific classification
- Domain: Eukaryota
- Kingdom: Animalia
- Phylum: Arthropoda
- Class: Insecta
- Order: Lepidoptera
- Superfamily: Noctuoidea
- Family: Erebidae
- Subfamily: Arctiinae
- Genus: Idalus
- Species: I. fasciipuncta

Binomial name
- Idalus fasciipuncta (Rothschild, 1909)

Synonyms
- Automolis fasciipuncta Rothschild, 1909

Species of moth

Idalus fasciipuncta is a moth of the family Erebidae. It was described by Walter Rothschild in 1909. It is found in Brazil and Peru.
