= Idalus lineosus =

Scientific classification
- Kingdom: Animalia
- Phylum: Arthropoda
- Class: Insecta
- Order: Lepidoptera
- Superfamily: Noctuoidea
- Family: Erebidae
- Subfamily: Arctiinae
- Genus: Idalus
- Species: I. lineosus

Binomial name
- Idalus lineosus Walker, 1869

Species of moth

Idalus lineosus is a moth of the family Erebidae. It was described by Francis Walker in 1869. It is found in French Guiana, Brazil, Colombia, Ecuador, Peru, Bolivia, Costa Rica and Honduras.
