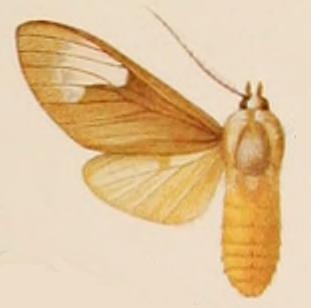

Scientific classification
- Domain: Eukaryota
- Kingdom: Animalia
- Phylum: Arthropoda
- Class: Insecta
- Order: Lepidoptera
- Superfamily: Noctuoidea
- Family: Erebidae
- Subfamily: Arctiinae
- Genus: Idalus
- Species: I. felderi

Binomial name
- Idalus felderi (Rothschild, 1909)

Synonyms
- Automolis felderi Rothschild, 1909

= Idalus felderi =

Species of moth

Idalus felderi is a moth of the family Erebidae first described by Walter Rothschild in 1909. It is found in Colombia.
