= Aphyle flavicolor =

Scientific classification
- Domain: Eukaryota
- Kingdom: Animalia
- Phylum: Arthropoda
- Class: Insecta
- Order: Lepidoptera
- Superfamily: Noctuoidea
- Family: Erebidae
- Subfamily: Arctiinae
- Genus: Aphyle
- Species: A. flavicolor

Binomial name
- Aphyle flavicolor Talbot, 1928

Species of moth

Aphyle flavicolor is a moth of the family Erebidae first described by George Talbot in 1928. It found in Brazil.
