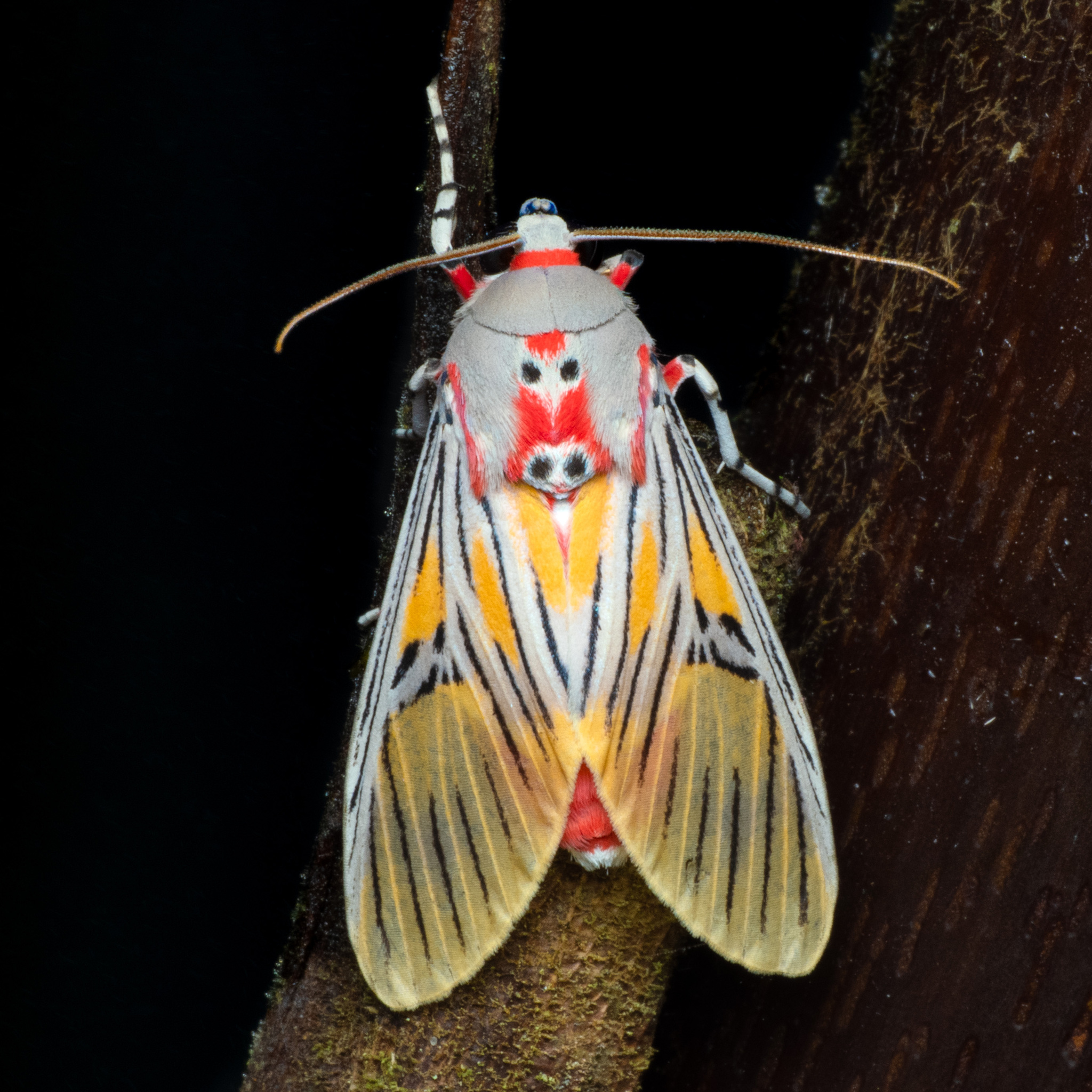

Scientific classification
- Kingdom: Animalia
- Phylum: Arthropoda
- Clade: Pancrustacea
- Class: Insecta
- Order: Lepidoptera
- Superfamily: Noctuoidea
- Family: Erebidae
- Subfamily: Arctiinae
- Genus: Idalus
- Species: I. sublineata

Binomial name
- Idalus sublineata (Rothschild, 1917)

Synonyms
- Automolis sublineata Rothschild, 1917

= Idalus sublineata =

Species of moth

Idalus sublineata is a moth of the family Erebidae. It was described by Walter Rothschild in 1917. It is found in Peru.

== Gallery ==
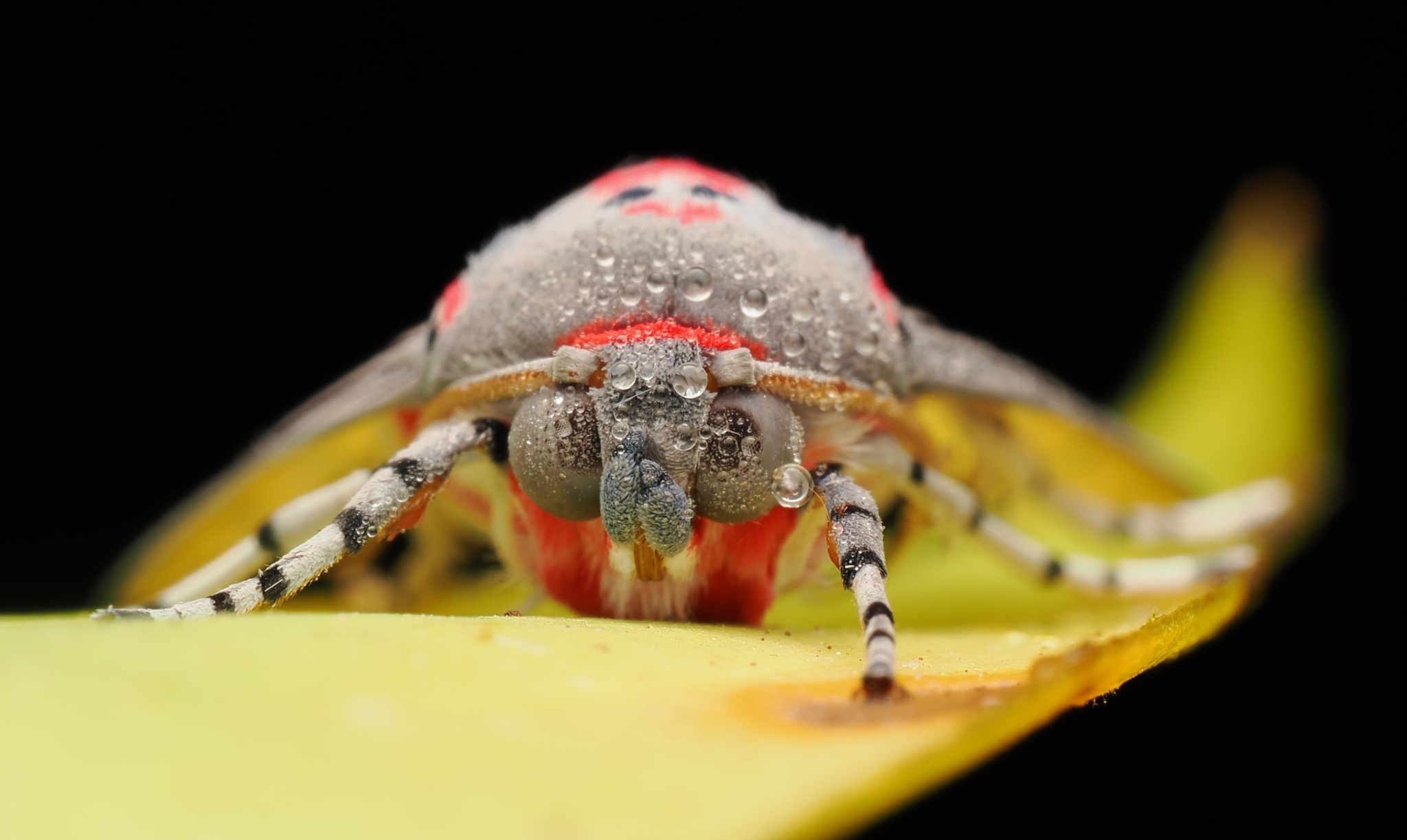
Idalus sublineata from San José Province, Pérez Zeledón, Costa Rica

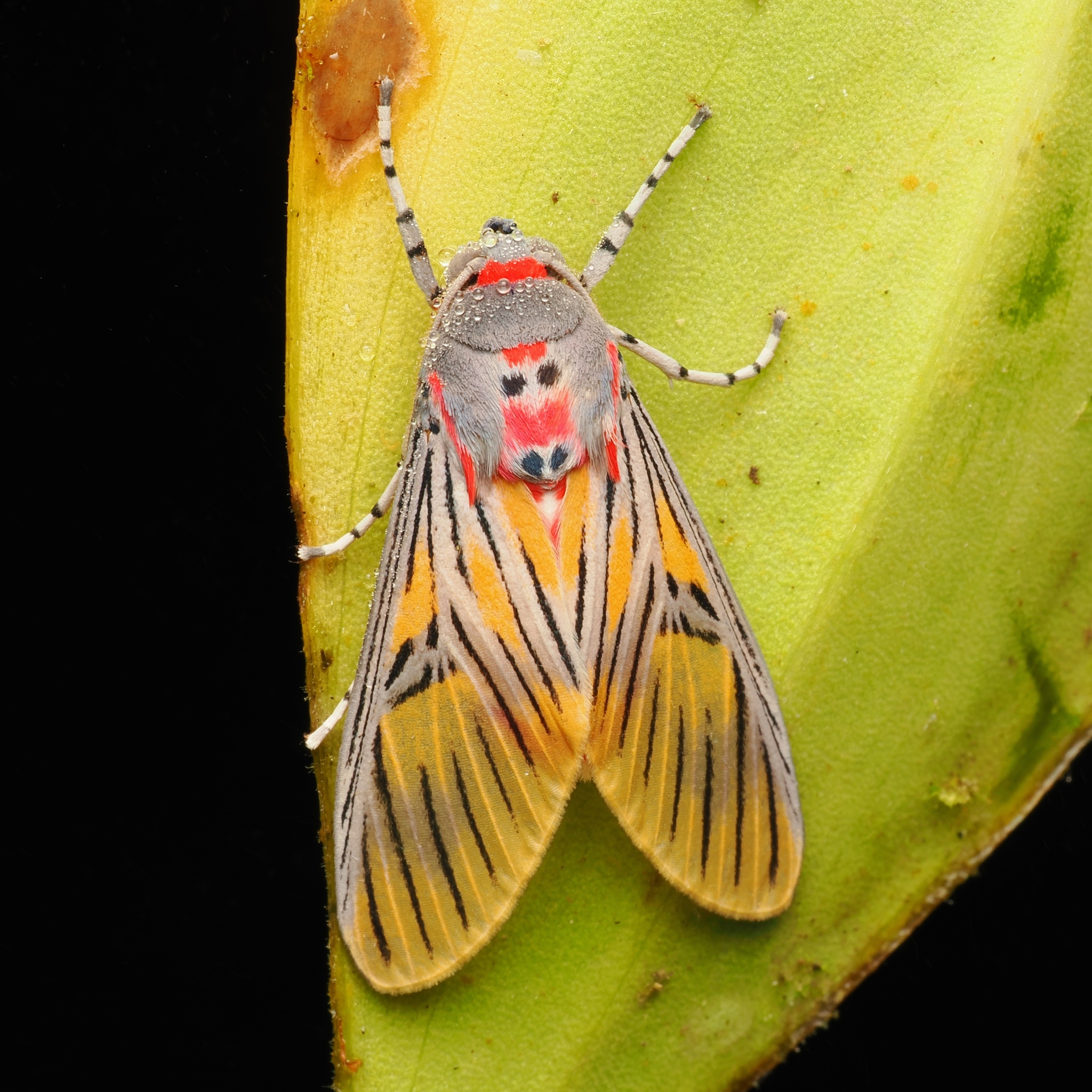
Idalus sublineata from San José Province, Pérez Zeledón, Costa Rica

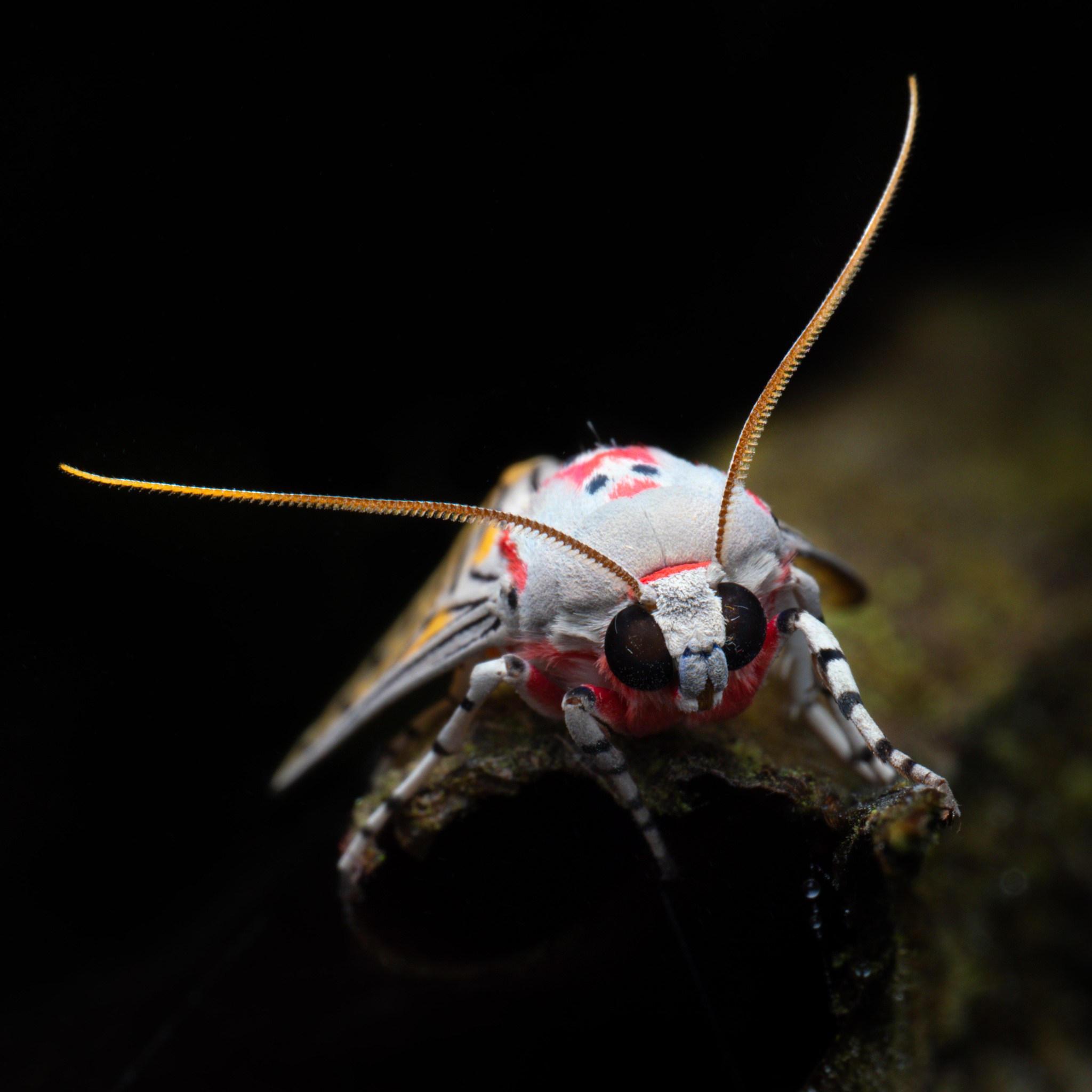
Idalus sublineata from San José Province, Pérez Zeledón, Costa Rica
