= Araeomolis transversa =

Scientific classification
- Kingdom: Animalia
- Phylum: Arthropoda
- Class: Insecta
- Order: Lepidoptera
- Superfamily: Noctuoidea
- Family: Erebidae
- Subfamily: Arctiinae
- Genus: Araeomolis
- Species: A. transversa

Binomial name
- Araeomolis transversa Toulgoët, 1993

Species of moth

Araeomolis transversa is a moth of the family Erebidae. It is found in French Guiana.
