= Araeomolis insignis =

Scientific classification
- Kingdom: Animalia
- Phylum: Arthropoda
- Class: Insecta
- Order: Lepidoptera
- Superfamily: Noctuoidea
- Family: Erebidae
- Subfamily: Arctiinae
- Genus: Araeomolis
- Species: A. insignis

Binomial name
- Araeomolis insignis Toulgoët, 1998

Species of moth

Araeomolis insignis is a moth of the subfamily Arctiinae first described by Hervé de Toulgoët in 1998. It is found in Ecuador.
