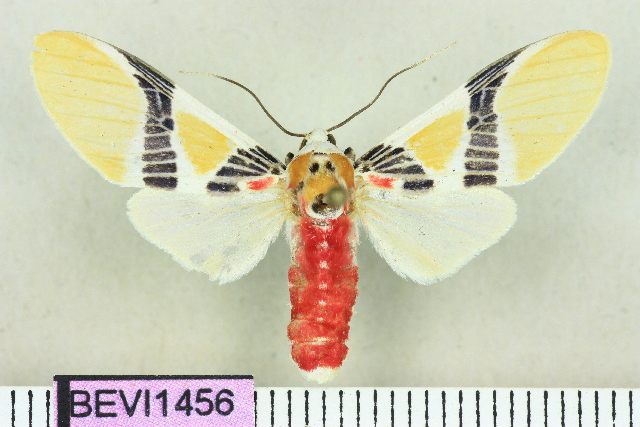

Scientific classification
- Domain: Eukaryota
- Kingdom: Animalia
- Phylum: Arthropoda
- Class: Insecta
- Order: Lepidoptera
- Superfamily: Noctuoidea
- Family: Erebidae
- Subfamily: Arctiinae
- Genus: Idalus
- Species: I. carinosa

Binomial name
- Idalus carinosa (Schaus, 1905)

Synonyms
- Automolis carinosa Schaus, 1905

= Idalus carinosa =

Species of moth

Idalus carinosa is a moth of the family Erebidae. It was described by William Schaus in 1905. It is found in French Guiana, Brazil, Venezuela and Bolivia.
