= Idalus bicolorella =

Scientific classification
- Domain: Eukaryota
- Kingdom: Animalia
- Phylum: Arthropoda
- Class: Insecta
- Order: Lepidoptera
- Superfamily: Noctuoidea
- Family: Erebidae
- Subfamily: Arctiinae
- Genus: Idalus
- Species: I. bicolorella

Binomial name
- Idalus bicolorella (Strand, 1919)

Synonyms
- Automolis bicolorella Strand, 1919; Automolis bicolor Rothschild, 1909 (preocc. Herrich-Schäffer, 1866)

Species of moth

Idalus bicolorella is a moth of the family Erebidae. It was described by Embrik Strand in 1919. It is found in Venezuela.
