= Idalus dilucida =

Scientific classification
- Domain: Eukaryota
- Kingdom: Animalia
- Phylum: Arthropoda
- Class: Insecta
- Order: Lepidoptera
- Superfamily: Noctuoidea
- Family: Erebidae
- Subfamily: Arctiinae
- Genus: Idalus
- Species: I. dilucida

Binomial name
- Idalus dilucida (Rothschild, 1910)

Synonyms
- Automolis dilucida Rothschild, 1910

Species of moth

Idalus dilucida is a moth of the family Erebidae. It was described by Walter Rothschild in 1910. It is found in Peru.
