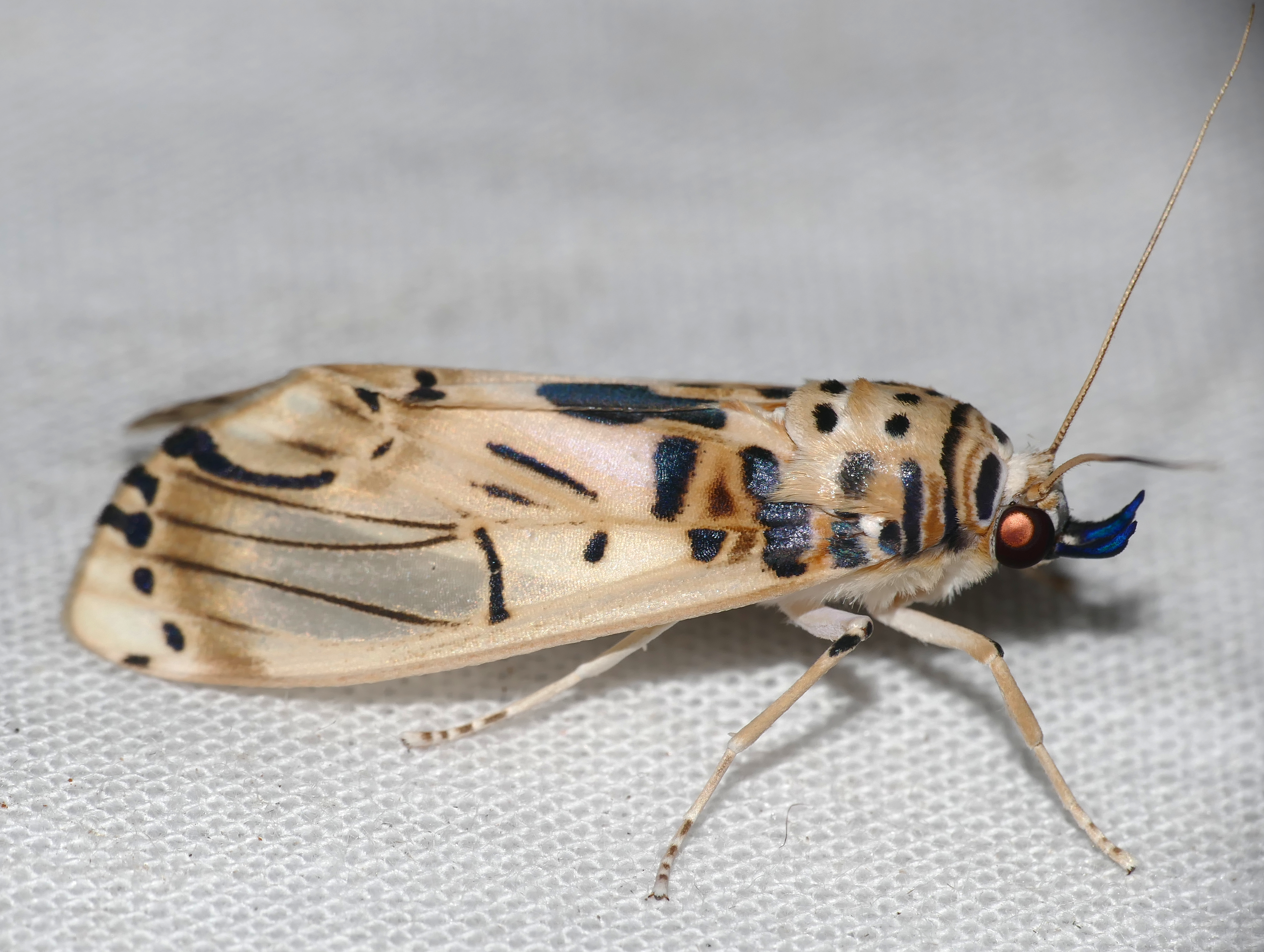

Scientific classification
- Kingdom: Animalia
- Phylum: Arthropoda
- Class: Insecta
- Order: Lepidoptera
- Superfamily: Noctuoidea
- Family: Erebidae
- Subfamily: Arctiinae
- Genus: Aphyle
- Species: A. cuneata

Binomial name
- Aphyle cuneata Hampson, 1905

= Aphyle cuneata =

Species of moth

Aphyle cuneata is a moth of the family Erebidae first described by George Hampson in 1905. It is found in French Guiana, Guyana and the Brazilian state of Amazonas.
