= Araeomolis haematoneura =

Scientific classification
- Kingdom: Animalia
- Phylum: Arthropoda
- Class: Insecta
- Order: Lepidoptera
- Superfamily: Noctuoidea
- Family: Erebidae
- Subfamily: Arctiinae
- Genus: Araeomolis
- Species: A. haematoneura

Binomial name
- Araeomolis haematoneura Joicey & Talbot, 1916

Species of moth

Araeomolis haematoneura is a moth of the family Erebidae. It was described by entomologists James John Joicey and George Talbot in 1916. It is found in Colombia. The type material was collected in September 1909 near San Juan on the Chocoan slopes at an altitude of 4,600 feet (1,400 m).
