= Eriostepta =

Scientific classification
- Kingdom: Animalia
- Phylum: Arthropoda
- Class: Insecta
- Order: Lepidoptera
- Superfamily: Noctuoidea
- Family: Erebidae
- Subfamily: Arctiinae
- Subtribe: Phaegopterina
- Genus: Eriostepta; Hampson, 1901

Genus of moths

Eriostepta is a genus of moths in the family Erebidae. The genus was erected by George Hampson in 1901.

== Species ==
- Eriostepta bacchans Schaus, 1905
- Eriostepta fulvescens Rothschild, 1909
- Eriostepta nigripuncta (Joicey & Talbot, 1918)
- Eriostepta roseireta Hampson, 1901
- Eriostepta sanguinea (Hampson, 1905)

== Former species ==
- Eriostepta albiscripta (Schaus, 1905)
