= Aphyle onorei =

Scientific classification
- Kingdom: Animalia
- Phylum: Arthropoda
- Class: Insecta
- Order: Lepidoptera
- Superfamily: Noctuoidea
- Family: Erebidae
- Subfamily: Arctiinae
- Genus: Aphyle
- Species: A. onorei

Binomial name
- Aphyle onorei Toulgoët, 1988

Species of moth

Aphyle onorei is a moth of the family Erebidae. It is found in Ecuador.
