= Araeomolis rubens =

Scientific classification
- Domain: Eukaryota
- Kingdom: Animalia
- Phylum: Arthropoda
- Class: Insecta
- Order: Lepidoptera
- Superfamily: Noctuoidea
- Family: Erebidae
- Subfamily: Arctiinae
- Genus: Araeomolis
- Species: A. rubens

Binomial name
- Araeomolis rubens (Schaus, 1905)

Synonyms
- Idalus rubens Schaus, 1905; Araeomolis guianensis Joicey & Talbot, 1916

Species of moth

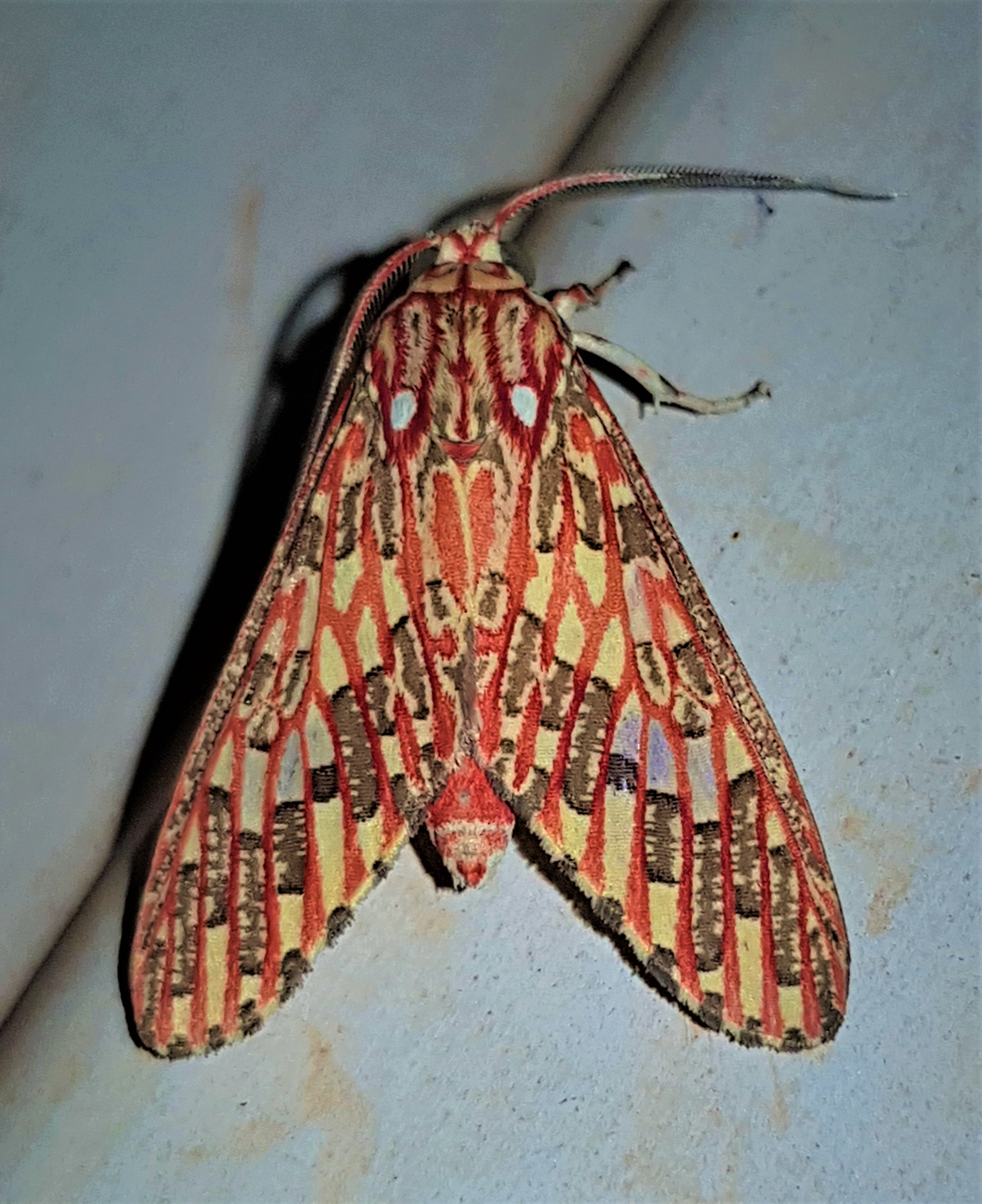

Araeomolis rubens is a moth of the family Erebidae. It was described by William Schaus in 1905. It is found in French Guiana, Venezuela, Peru, Suriname and the Brazilian state of Amazonas.

== Description ==
The forewing measures 17 mm (0.67 in) and, on its upperside, is chocolate brown mixed with white-grey speckles that lie along the costa and both sides of the crimson veins; the underside of the forewing is paler, and its veins are striped with crimson. The hindwing is crimson, grading to a paler colour costally. The antennae are brownish, and have crimson stripes on the posterior region.
