= Idalus flavibrunnea =

Scientific classification
- Domain: Eukaryota
- Kingdom: Animalia
- Phylum: Arthropoda
- Class: Insecta
- Order: Lepidoptera
- Superfamily: Noctuoidea
- Family: Erebidae
- Subfamily: Arctiinae
- Genus: Idalus
- Species: I. flavibrunnea

Binomial name
- Idalus flavibrunnea Dognin, 1906

Species of moth

Idalus flavibrunnea is a moth of the subfamily Arctiinae. It was described by Paul Dognin in 1906. It is found in Peru.
