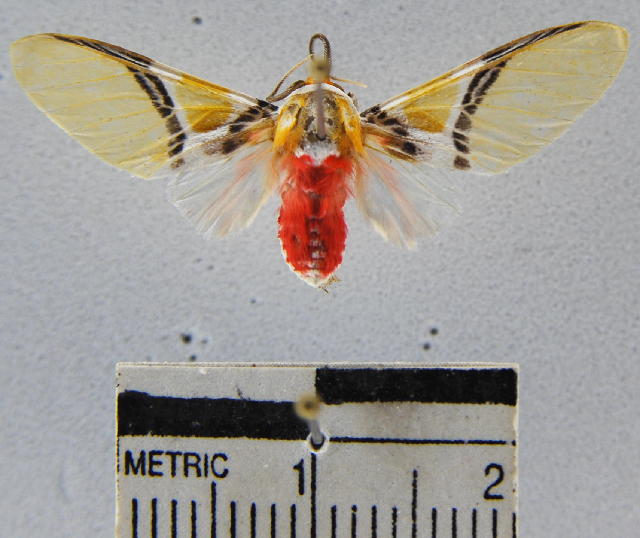

Scientific classification
- Domain: Eukaryota
- Kingdom: Animalia
- Phylum: Arthropoda
- Class: Insecta
- Order: Lepidoptera
- Superfamily: Noctuoidea
- Family: Erebidae
- Subfamily: Arctiinae
- Genus: Idalus
- Species: I. critheis

Binomial name
- Idalus critheis H. Druce, 1884

= Idalus critheis =

Species of moth

Idalus critheis is a moth of the family Erebidae. It was described by Herbert Druce in 1884. It is found in French Guiana, Guyana, Brazil, Venezuela, Colombia, Ecuador, Peru and Panama.
