= Idalus perlineosa =

Scientific classification
- Domain: Eukaryota
- Kingdom: Animalia
- Phylum: Arthropoda
- Class: Insecta
- Order: Lepidoptera
- Superfamily: Noctuoidea
- Family: Erebidae
- Subfamily: Arctiinae
- Genus: Idalus
- Species: I. perlineosa

Binomial name
- Idalus perlineosa (Rothschild, 1917)

Synonyms
- Automolis perlineosa Rothschild, 1917

Species of moth

Idalus perlineosa is a moth of the family Erebidae. It was described by Walter Rothschild in 1917. It is found in Costa Rica.
