= Idalus tumara =

Scientific classification
- Domain: Eukaryota
- Kingdom: Animalia
- Phylum: Arthropoda
- Class: Insecta
- Order: Lepidoptera
- Superfamily: Noctuoidea
- Family: Erebidae
- Subfamily: Arctiinae
- Genus: Idalus
- Species: I. tumara

Binomial name
- Idalus tumara Schaus, 1921

Species of moth

Idalus tumara is a moth of the family Erebidae. It was described by William Schaus in 1921. It is found in Guyana.
