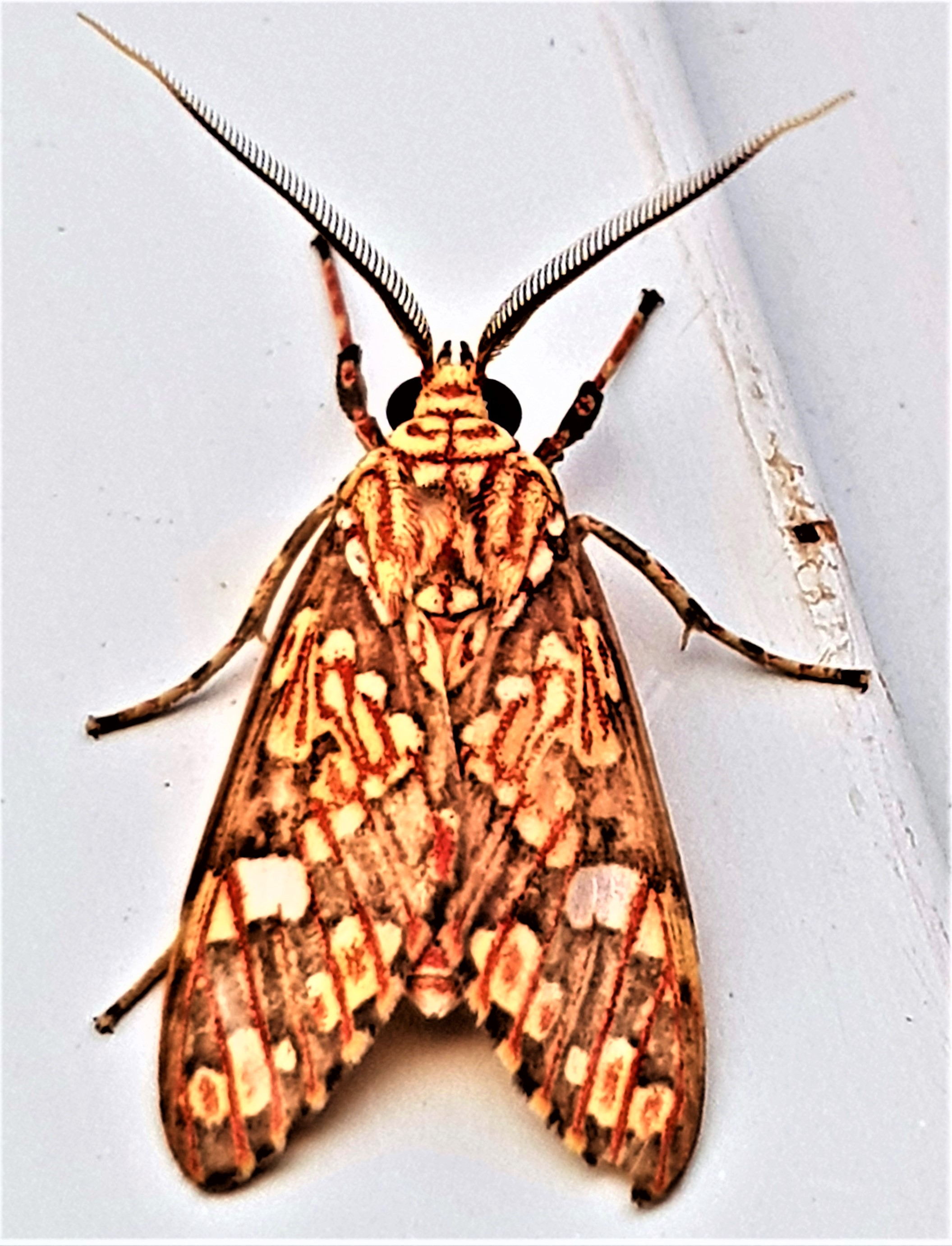
- Adult

Scientific classification
- Kingdom: Animalia
- Phylum: Arthropoda
- Class: Insecta
- Order: Lepidoptera
- Superfamily: Noctuoidea
- Family: Erebidae
- Subfamily: Arctiinae
- Genus: Araeomolis
- Species: A. rhodographa

Binomial name
- Araeomolis rhodographa Hampson, 1901

Synonyms
- Araeomolis peruviana Rothschild, 1909

= Araeomolis rhodographa =

Species of moth

Araeomolis rhodographa is a species of moth in the family Erebidae. It was described by George Hampson in 1901. It is found in French Guiana, Venezuela, Colombia, Bolivia, Panama, Suriname and the Brazilian state of Amazonas.

== Subspecies ==
- Araeomolis rhodographa rhodographa (Colombia)
- Araeomolis rhodographa peruviana Rothschild, 1909 (Peru)
