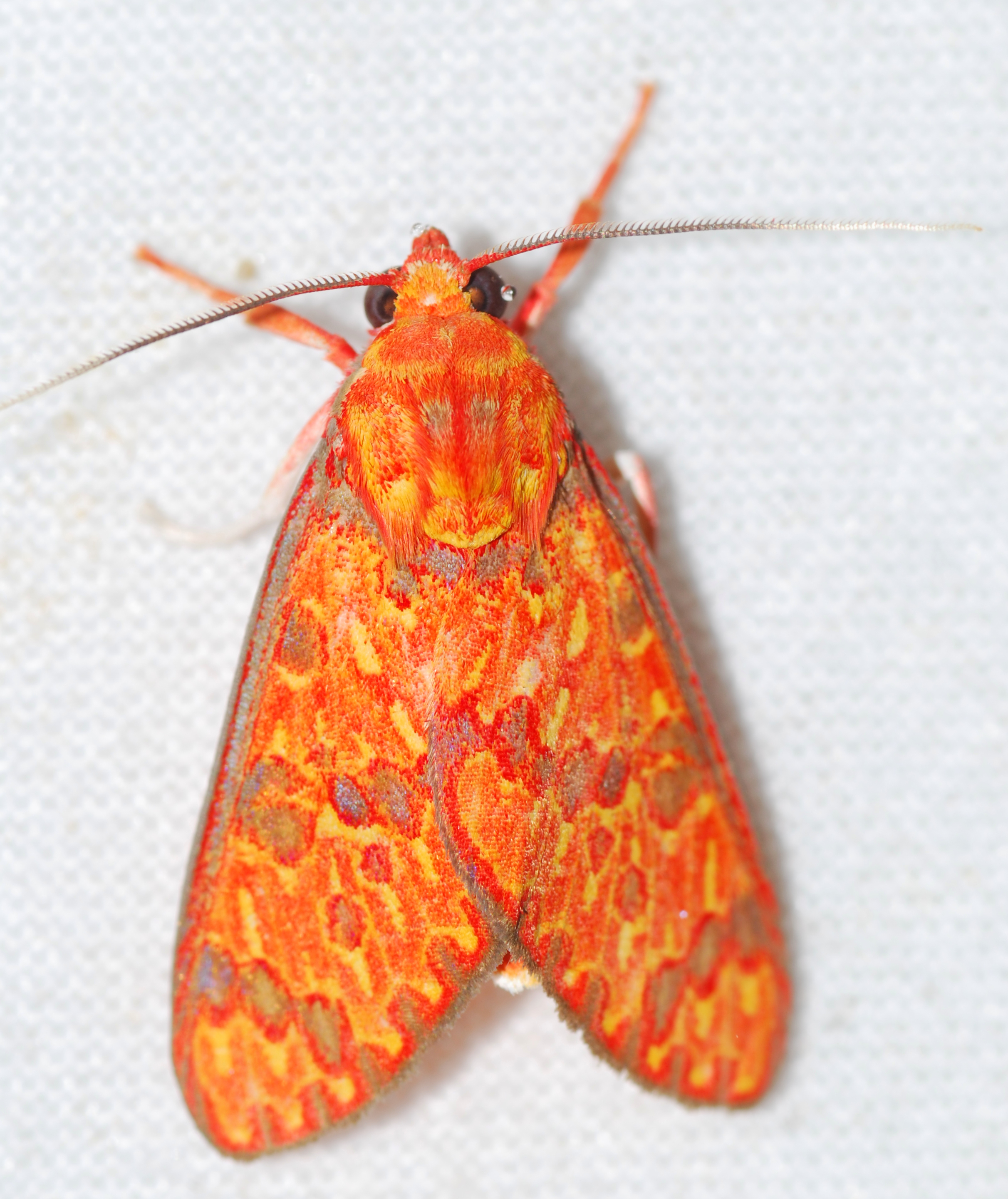

Scientific classification
- Domain: Eukaryota
- Kingdom: Animalia
- Phylum: Arthropoda
- Class: Insecta
- Order: Lepidoptera
- Superfamily: Noctuoidea
- Family: Erebidae
- Subfamily: Arctiinae
- Genus: Eriostepta
- Species: E. bacchans

Binomial name
- Eriostepta bacchans Schaus, 1905

= Eriostepta bacchans =

Species of moth

Eriostepta bacchans is a moth of the family Erebidae first described by William Schaus in 1905. It is found in French Guiana and Suriname.
