= Idalus panamensis =

Scientific classification
- Kingdom: Animalia
- Phylum: Arthropoda
- Class: Insecta
- Order: Lepidoptera
- Superfamily: Noctuoidea
- Family: Erebidae
- Subfamily: Arctiinae
- Genus: Idalus
- Species: I. panamensis

Binomial name
- Idalus panamensis Schaus, 1921

Species of moth

Idalus panamensis is a moth belonging to the Erebidae family. It was described by William Schaus in 1921. It is found in Panama.
