= Idalus vitreoides =

Scientific classification
- Domain: Eukaryota
- Kingdom: Animalia
- Phylum: Arthropoda
- Class: Insecta
- Order: Lepidoptera
- Superfamily: Noctuoidea
- Family: Erebidae
- Subfamily: Arctiinae
- Genus: Idalus
- Species: I. vitreoides

Binomial name
- Idalus vitreoides (Rothschild, 1922)

Synonyms
- Automolis vitreoides Rothschild, 1922

Species of moth

Idalus vitreoides is a moth of the family Erebidae. It was described by Walter Rothschild in 1922. It is known from Trinidad, Costa Rica, and Brazil.
