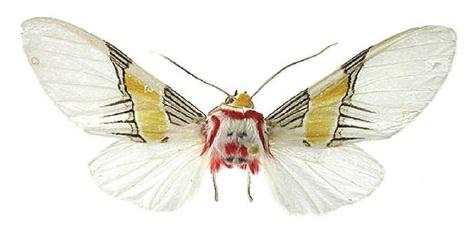
- Female Idalus paulae, dorsal view

Scientific classification
- Kingdom: Animalia
- Phylum: Arthropoda
- Class: Insecta
- Order: Lepidoptera
- Superfamily: Noctuoidea
- Family: Erebidae
- Subfamily: Arctiinae
- Subtribe: Phaegopterina
- Genus: Idalus; Walker, 1855

Synonyms
- Empusa Hübner, [1819] (preocc.)

= Idalus =

Genus of moths

Idalus is a genus of moths in the family Erebidae. The genus was erected by Francis Walker in 1855.

== Species ==
- Idalus admirabilis (Cramer, [1777])
- Idalus affinis Rothschild, 1917
- Idalus agastus Dyar, 1910
- Idalus agricus Dyar, 1910
- Idalus albescens (Rothschild, 1909)
- Idalus albidior Rothschild, 1917
- Idalus aleteria (Schaus, 1905)
- Idalus aletis (Schaus, 1910)
- Idalus bicolorella (Strand, 1919)
- Idalus brachystriata (Dognin, 1912)
- Idalus carinosa (Schaus, 1905)
- Idalus citrina Druce, 1890
- Idalus crinis Druce, 1884
- Idalus critheis Druce, 1884
- Idalus daga (Dognin, 1891)
- Idalus dares Druce, 1894
- Idalus decisa (Rothschild, 1917)
- Idalus delicata Möschler, 1886
- Idalus dilucida (Rothschild, 1910)
- Idalus dognini (Rothschild, 1910)
- Idalus dorsalis (Seitz, 1921)
- Idalus erythronota (Herrich-Schäffer, [1853])
- Idalus fasciipuncta (Rothschild, 1909)
- Idalus felderi (Rothschild, 1909)
- Idalus flavibrunnea Dognin, 1906
- Idalus flavicostalis (Rothschild, 1935)
- Idalus herois Schaus, 1889
- Idalus idalia (Hampson, 1901)
- Idalus intermedia (Rothschild, 1909)
- Idalus iragorri (Dognin, 1902)
- Idalus irrupta (Schaus, 1905)
- Idalus lineosus Walker, 1869
- Idalus lucens (Druce, 1901)
- Idalus luteorosea (Rothschild, 1909)
- Idalus lutescens Rothschild, 1909
- Idalus maesi Laguerre, 2006
- Idalus metacrinis (Rothschild, 1909)
- Idalus monostidza (Hampson, 1916)
- Idalus multicolor (Rothschild, 1909)
- Idalus nigropunctata (Rothschild, 1909)
- Idalus noiva (E. D. Jones, 1914)
- Idalus ochracea (Rothschild, 1909)
- Idalus ochreata (Schaus, 1905)
- Idalus ortus Schaus, 1892
- Idalus panamensis Schaus, 1921
- Idalus paulae Espinoza, 2013
- Idalus perlineosa (Rothschild, 1917)
- Idalus pichesensis Dyar, 1898
- Idalus quadratus Rothschild, 1933
- Idalus sublineata (Rothschild, 1917)
- Idalus tenuifascia (Dognin, 1911)
- Idalus tuisana (Schaus, 1910)
- Idalus tumara Schaus, 1921
- Idalus tybris (Cramer, [1776])
- Idalus veneta Dognin, 1901
- Idalus vitrea (Cramer, [1780])
- Idalus vitreoides (Rothschild, 1922)
