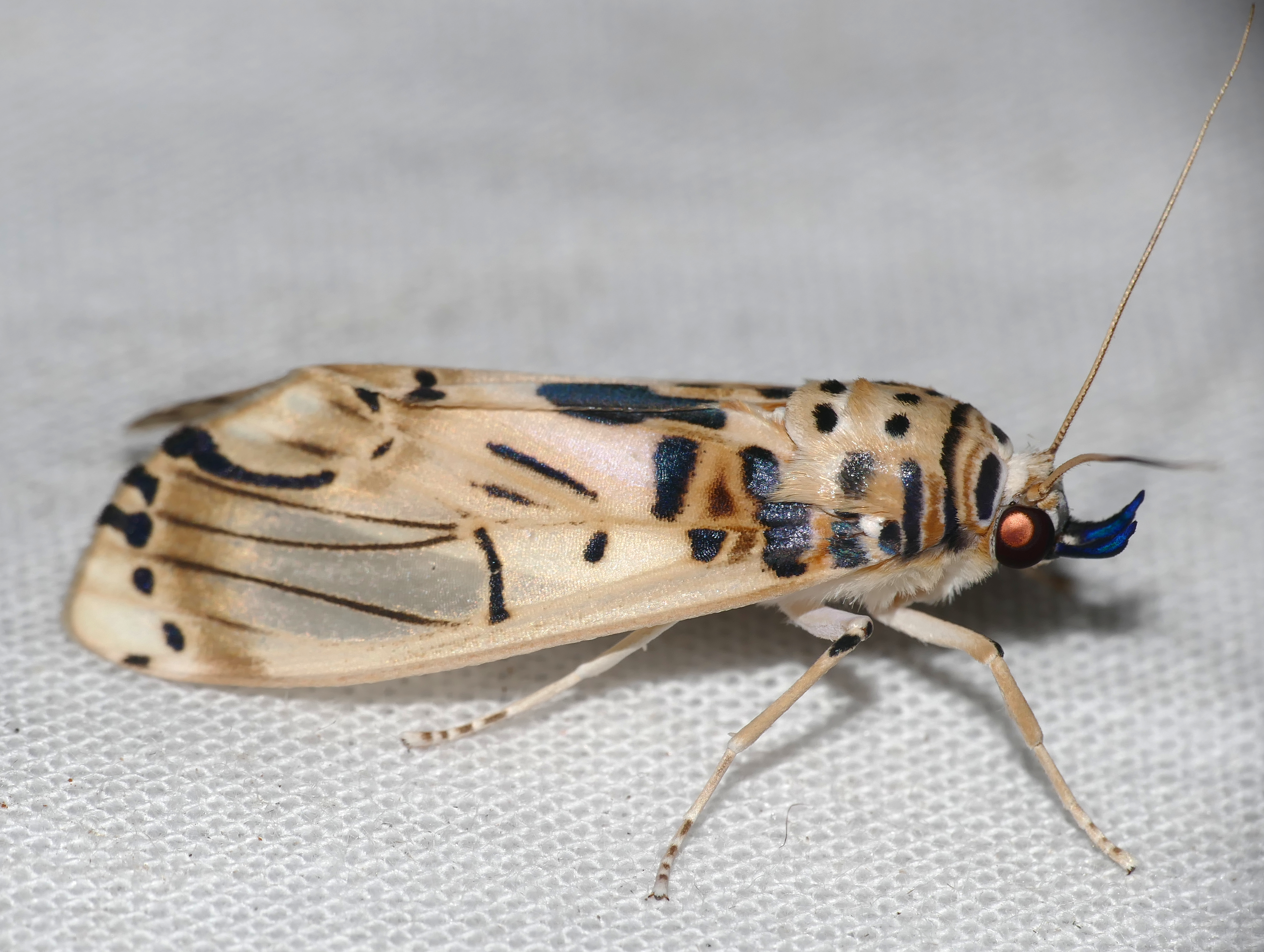
- Aphyle cuneata

Scientific classification
- Kingdom: Animalia
- Phylum: Arthropoda
- Class: Insecta
- Order: Lepidoptera
- Superfamily: Noctuoidea
- Family: Erebidae
- Subfamily: Arctiinae
- Subtribe: Phaegopterina
- Genus: Aphyle; Walker, 1855

= Aphyle =

Genus of moths

Aphyle is a genus of moths in the family Erebidae. The genus was erected by Francis Walker in 1855.

== Species ==
- Aphyle affinis
- Aphyle cuneata
- Aphyle flavicolor
- Aphyle margaritaceus
- Aphyle onorei
- Aphyle steinbachi
