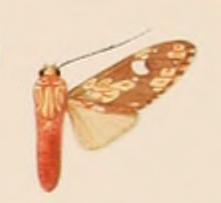
- Araeomolis persimilis

Scientific classification
- Kingdom: Animalia
- Phylum: Arthropoda
- Class: Insecta
- Order: Lepidoptera
- Superfamily: Noctuoidea
- Family: Erebidae
- Subfamily: Arctiinae
- Tribe: Arctiini
- Subtribe: Phaegopterina
- Genus: Araeomolis; Hampson, 1901

= Araeomolis =

Genus of moths

Araeomolis is a genus of moths in the family Erebidae. The genus was erected by George Hampson in 1901.

== Species ==
- Araeomolis albipicta (Dognin, 1909)
- Araeomolis haematoneura Joicey & Talbot, 1916
- Araeomolis insignis Toulgoët, 1998
- Araeomolis irregularis (Rothschild, 1909)
- Araeomolis persimilis Rothschild, 1909
- Araeomolis propinqua Toulgoët, 1998
- Araeomolis rhodographa Hampson, 1901
- Araeomolis robusta Toulgoët, 1987
- Araeomolis rubens (Schaus, 1905)
- Araeomolis transversa Toulgoët, 1993
