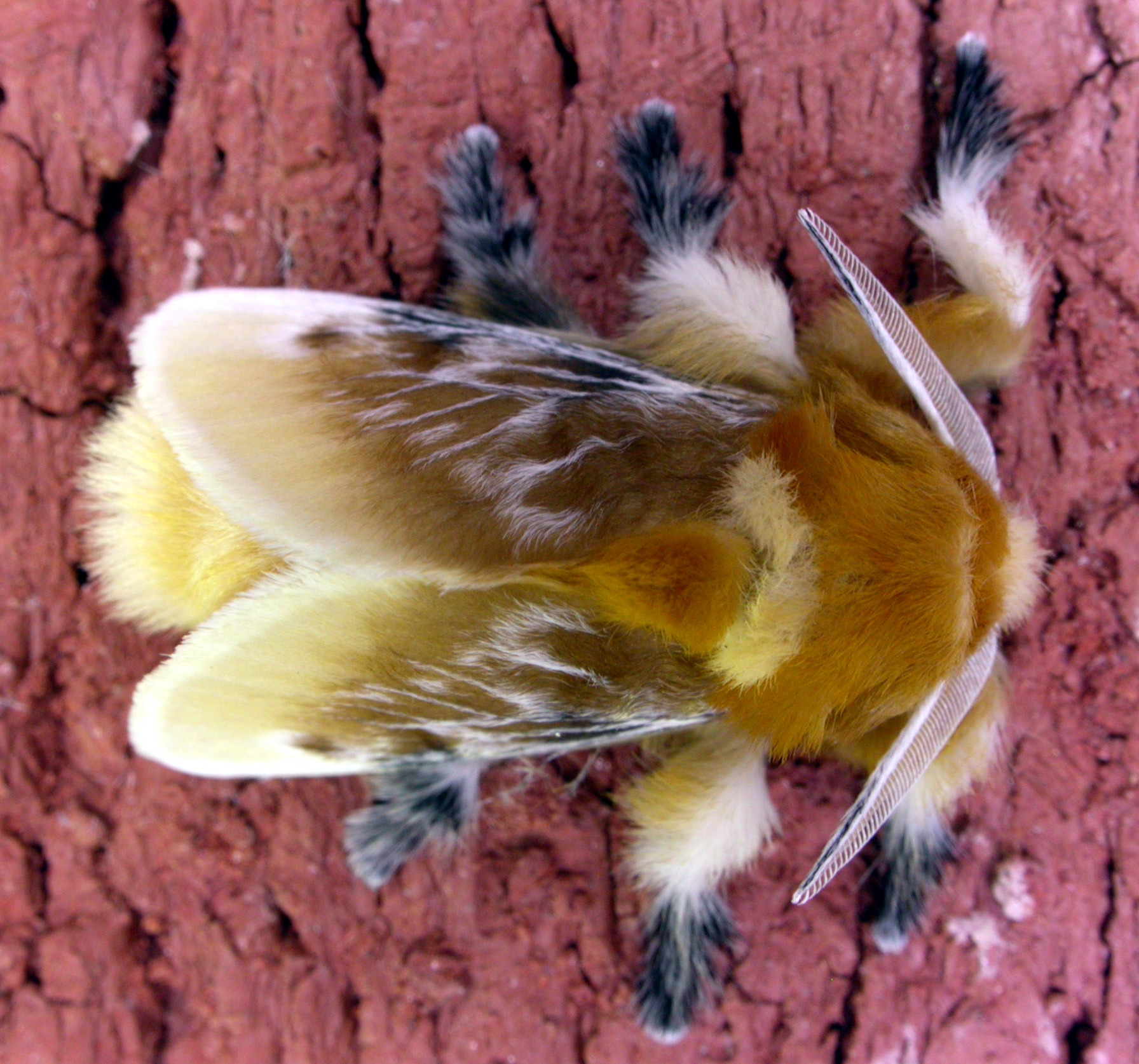
- Megalopyge opercularis

Scientific classification
- Kingdom: Animalia
- Phylum: Arthropoda
- Clade: Pancrustacea
- Class: Insecta
- Order: Lepidoptera
- Family: Megalopygidae
- Genus: Megalopyge; Hübner, 1820

Synonyms
- Alpis Walker, 1855; Chrysopyga Herrich-Schäffer, 1855; Cyclara Schaus, 1896; Oylothrix Clemens, 1860; Gasina q8821855; Lagoa Harris, 1841; Lagoa Walker, 1856; Pimela Clemens, 1860; Ochrosoma Herrich-Schäffer, 1856; Zebonda Walker, 1865

= Megalopyge =

Genus of moths

Megalopyge is a genus of moths in the family Megalopygidae.

== Species ==
- Megalopyge affinis (Druce, 1887)
- Megalopyge albicollis (Walker, 1855)
- Megalopyge amita Schaus, 1900
- Megalopyge amitina Dognin, 1912
- Megalopyge apicalis (Herrich-Schäffer, 1856)
- Megalopyge braulio Schaus
- Megalopyge brunneipennis (Schaus, 1905)
- Megalopyge chrysocoma (Herrich-Schäffer, 1856)
- Megalopyge crispata (Packard, 1864)
- Megalopyge defoliata (Walker, 1855)
- Megalopyge dyari Hopp, 1935
- Megalopyge hina (Dognin, 1911)
- Megalopyge hyalina (Schaus, 1905)
- Megalopyge immaculata (Cassino, 1928)
- Megalopyge inca Hopp, 1935
- Megalopyge krugii (Dewitz, 1897)
- Megalopyge lacyi (Barnes & McDunnough, 1910)
- Megalopyge lampra Dyar, 1910
- Megalopyge lanata (Stoll, 1780)
- Megalopyge lanceolata Dognin, 1923
- Megalopyge lapena Schaus, 1896
- Megalopyge lecca (Druce, 1890)
- Megalopyge megalopygae (Schaus, 1905)
- Megalopyge nuda (Stoll, 1789)
- Megalopyge obscura (Schaus, 1905)
- Megalopyge opercularis (Smith & Abbot, 1797)
- Megalopyge ovata (Schaus, 1896)
- Megalopyge perseae (Dognin, 1891)
- Megalopyge peruana Hopp, 1935
- Megalopyge pixidifera (Smith & Abbot, 1797)
- Megalopyge ravida (Druce, 1887)
- Megalopyge radiata Schaus, 1892
- Megalopyge salebrosa (Clemens, 1860)
- Megalopyge tharops (Stoll, 1782)
- Megalopyge torva Schaus, 1912
- Megalopyge trossula (Dognin, 1891)
- Megalopyge trujillina Dyar, 1910
- Megalopyge undulata (Herrich-Schäffer, 1858)
- Megalopyge urens Berg, 1882
- Megalopyge uruguayensis Berg, 1882
- Megalopyge victoriana Schaus, 1927
- Megalopyge vulpina Schaus, 1900
- Megalopyge xanthopasa (Sepp, 1828)

== Selected former species ==
- Megalopyge orsilochus (Cramer, [1775])
