= Megalopyge trujillina =

Scientific classification
- Kingdom: Animalia
- Phylum: Arthropoda
- Clade: Pancrustacea
- Class: Insecta
- Order: Lepidoptera
- Family: Megalopygidae
- Genus: Megalopyge
- Species: M. trujillina

Binomial name
- Megalopyge trujillina Dyar, 1910

Species of moth

Megalopyge trujillina is a moth of the family Megalopygidae. It was described by Harrison Gray Dyar Jr. in 1910. It is found in Mexico.

Adults are similar to Megalopyge trujillo, but somewhat smaller and with a yellowish olivaceous tint on the outer part of the wing, which is not nearly so distinct in Trujillo. The whitish submarginal line on the wing is more or less well indicated, while the whitish patch at the base of the wing is less distinct and contrasted, due largely to the general paler tint of the coloration.
