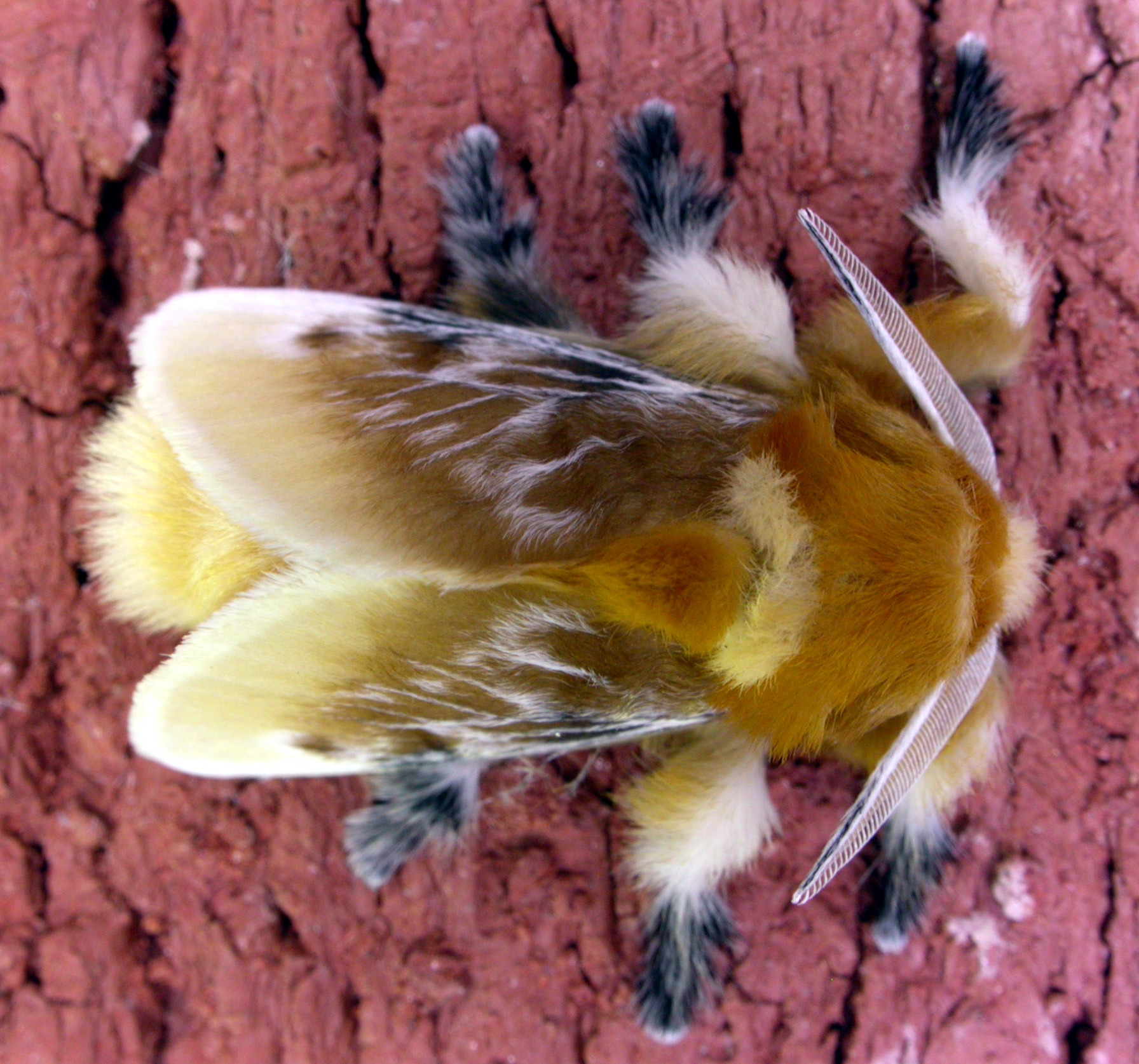
- Adult
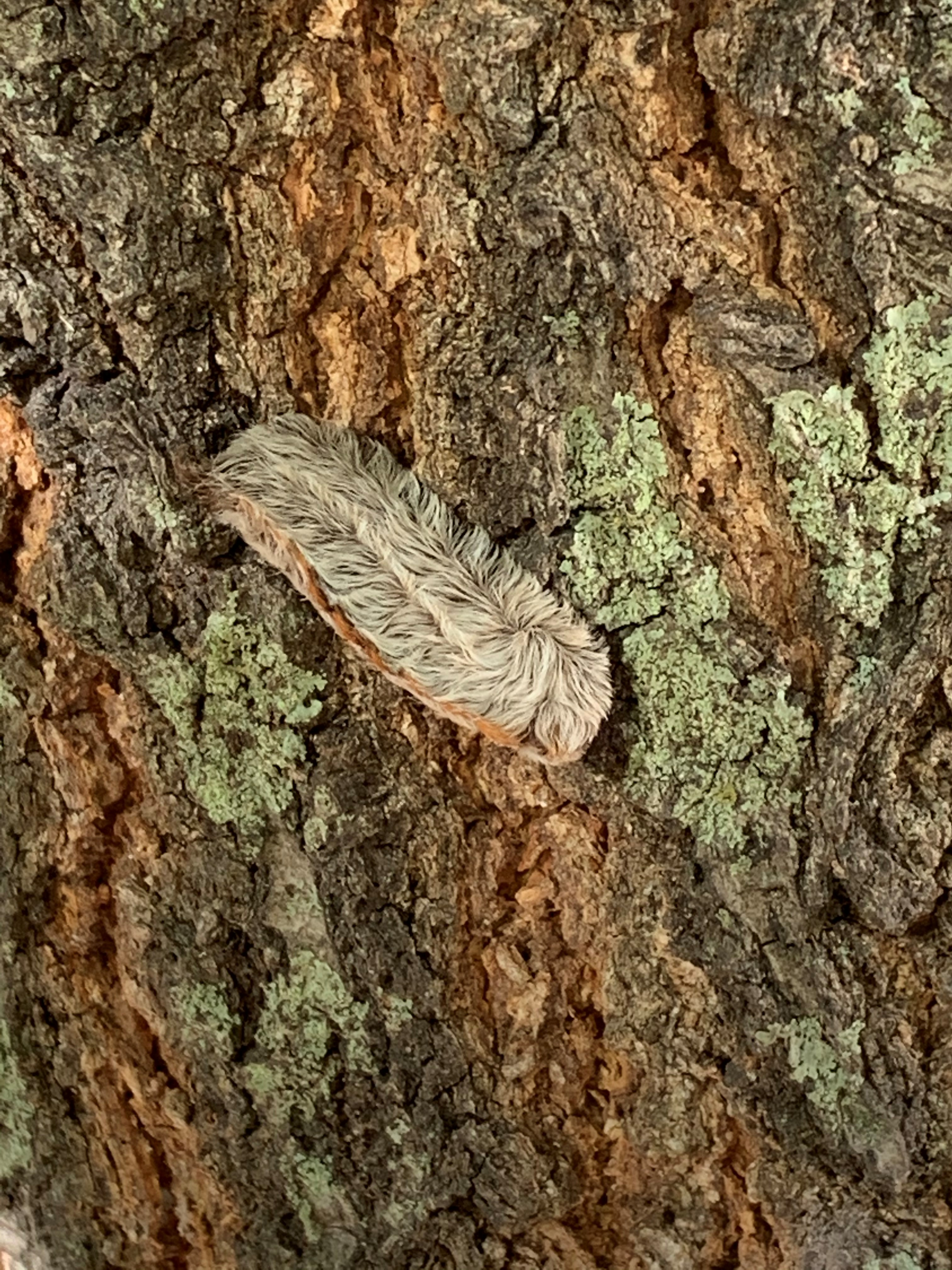
- Larva

Scientific classification
- Kingdom: Animalia
- Phylum: Arthropoda
- Clade: Pancrustacea
- Class: Insecta
- Order: Lepidoptera
- Family: Megalopygidae
- Genus: Megalopyge
- Species: M. opercularis

Binomial name
- Megalopyge opercularis (JE Smith, 1797)

Synonyms
- Phalaena opercularis Smith, 1797; Megalopyge albizona Dognin, 1923; Megalopyge bissesa Dyar, 1910; Megalopyge briseis Dyar, 1910; Megalopyge costaricensis Schaus, 1912; Megalopyge govana Schaus, 1904; Megalopyge incachaca Schaus, 1927; Pimela lanuginosa Clemens, 1860; Lagoa ornata Druce, 1887

= Megalopyge opercularis =

Venomous species of moth, "puss caterpillar"

Megalopyge opercularis is a moth of the family Megalopygidae. It has numerous common names, including southern flannel moth for its adult form, and puss caterpillar, asp, Italian asp, fire caterpillar, woolly slug, opossum bug, puss moth, tree asp, or asp caterpillar.

== Description ==
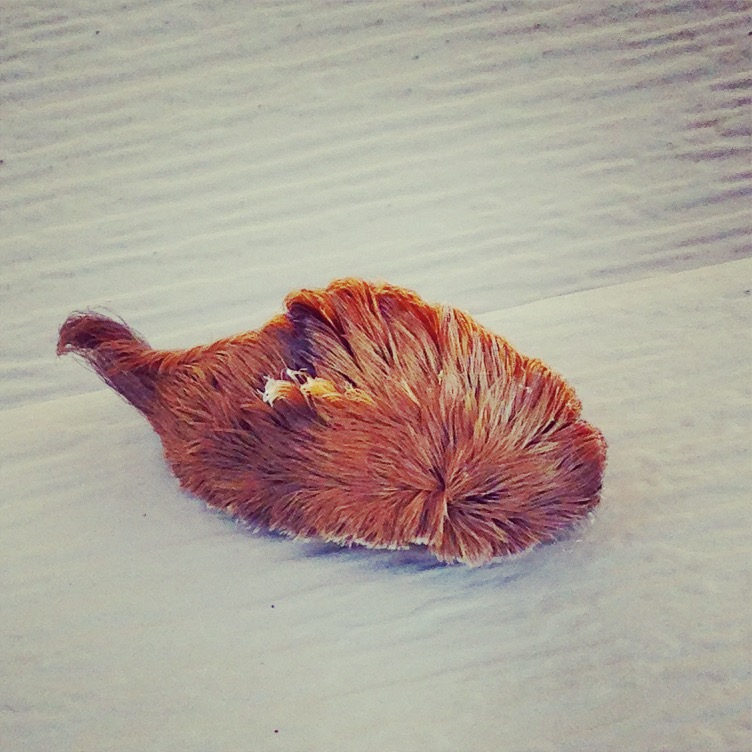
M. opercularis caterpillar on Kent Island, Maryland

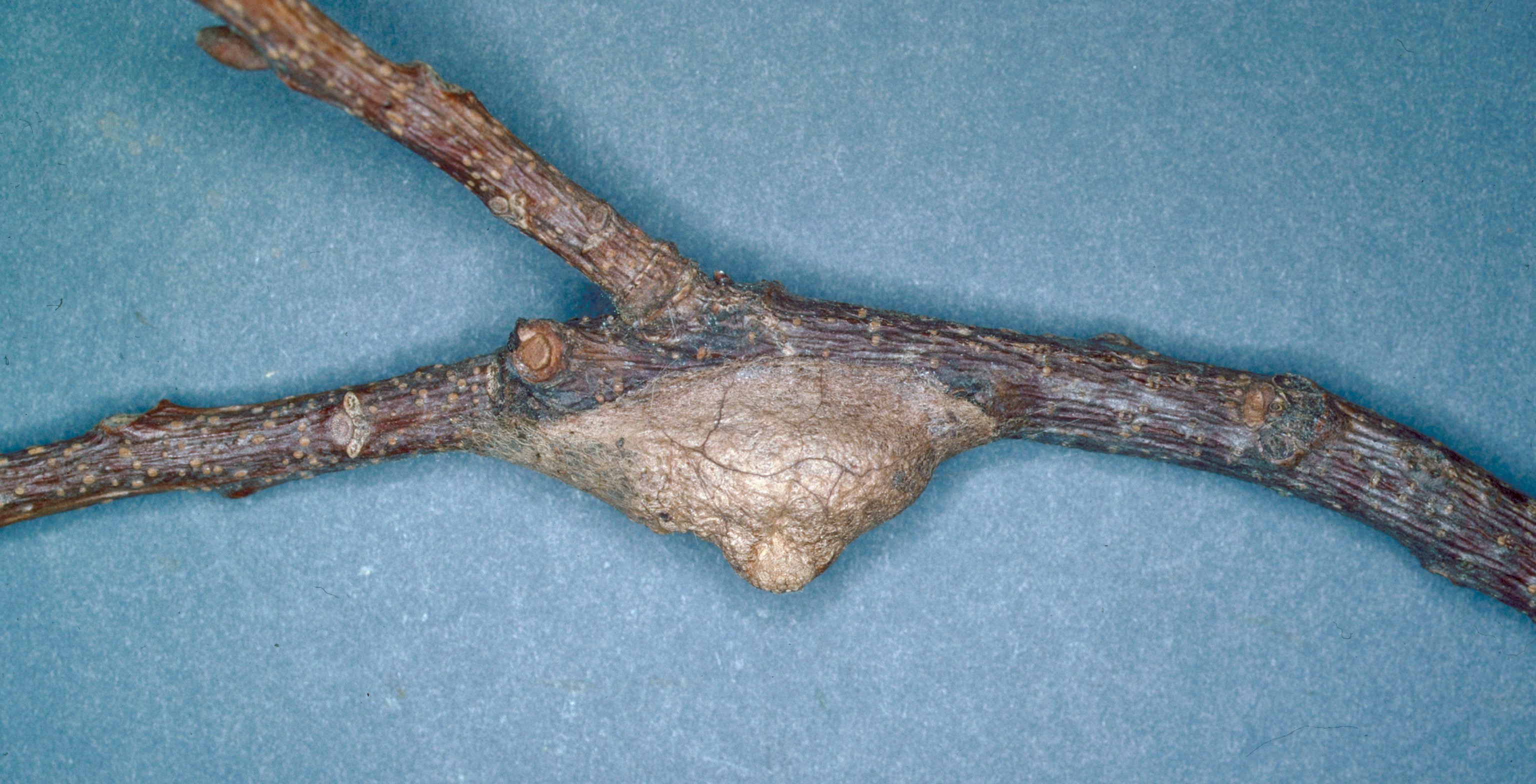
Cocoon

The inch-long larva is generously coated in long, luxuriant hair-like setae, making it resemble a tiny Persian cat, the characteristic that presumably gave it the name "puss." It is variable in color, from downy, grayish white to golden brown to dark, charcoal gray. It often has a streak of bright orange running longitudinally. The "fur" on early-stage larvae is sometimes extremely curly, giving them a cottony, puffed-up look. The body tapers to a tail that extends well beyond the body, unlike its relative M. crispata. The middle instar has a more disheveled, "bad-hair-day" appearance, without a distinctive tail. The "fur" of the larva contains venomous spines that cause extremely painful reactions in human skin upon contact. The adult moth is covered in long fur in colors ranging from dull orange to lemon yellow, with hairy legs and fuzzy black feet. The cocoons that these caterpillars emerge from vary in size from 1.3 to 2.0 centimeters and contain small hair pockets on the back and flattened front end, the latter covering the operculum at least until it is completely formed.

== Habitat ==
M. opercularis can be found on oak, elm, and wild plum, among others, as well as many garden plants such as roses and ivy. It is distributed throughout the Eastern United States between extreme southeastern Virginia and Florida, the Southern United States, Mexico, and parts of Central America and South America. The caterpillar has two broods, one in the summer and the other in the fall. Late larvae may stay in their cocoon all winter, and emerge in late spring as an adult.

== Dangers and treatment of stings ==
The caterpillar is regarded as a dangerous insect because of its venomous spines. Exposure to the caterpillar's fur-like spines leads to an immediate skin irritation characterized by a "grid-like hemorrhagic papular eruption with severe radiating pain." Victims describe the pain as similar to a broken bone or blunt-force trauma, or even white hot. The reactions are sometimes localized to the affected area, but are often very severe, radiating up a limb and causing burning, swelling, nausea, headache, abdominal distress, rashes, blisters, and sometimes chest pain, numbness, or difficulty breathing. Sweating from the welts or hives at the site of the sting is not unusual.

The venom from the spines is best treated within hours of first contact. For first aid, the spines (if present) should be removed by using cellophane tape. Some remedies, which are reported to have varying degrees of success, include ice packs, oral antihistamine, baking soda, hydrocortisone cream, juice from the stems of comfrey plants, and calamine lotion. The caterpillar sting causes a condition called urticarial dermatitis or erucism, with M. opercularis contact being the most commonly reported source in the United States.
