= Podalia dimidiata =

Scientific classification
- Kingdom: Animalia
- Phylum: Arthropoda
- Clade: Pancrustacea
- Class: Insecta
- Order: Lepidoptera
- Family: Megalopygidae
- Genus: Podalia
- Species: P. dimidiata

Binomial name
- Podalia dimidiata (Herrich-Schäffer, 1856)

Synonyms
- Limacodes dimidiata Herrich-Schäffer, 1856; Repnoa arpi Schaus, 1915

Species of moth

Podalia dimidiata is a moth of the Megalopygidae family. It was described by Gottlieb August Wilhelm Herrich-Schäffer in 1856. It is found in Brazil.
