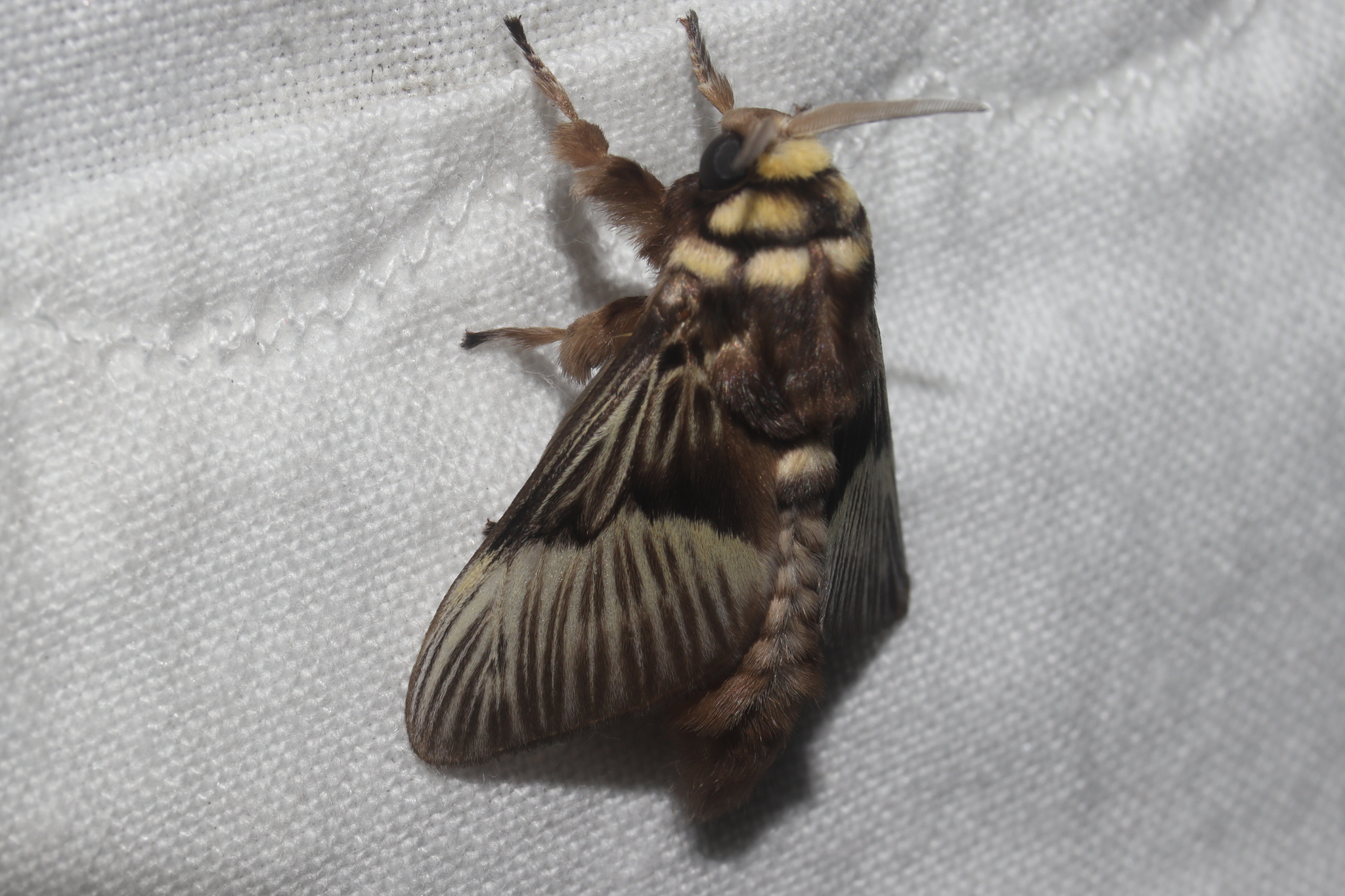

Scientific classification
- Kingdom: Animalia
- Phylum: Arthropoda
- Clade: Pancrustacea
- Class: Insecta
- Order: Lepidoptera
- Family: Megalopygidae
- Genus: Megalopyge
- Species: M. lampra

Binomial name
- Megalopyge lampra Dyar, 1910

= Megalopyge lampra =

Species of moth

Megalopyge lampra is a moth of the family Megalopygidae. It was described by Harrison Gray Dyar Jr. in 1910.
