= Megalopyge perseae =

Scientific classification
- Kingdom: Animalia
- Phylum: Arthropoda
- Clade: Pancrustacea
- Class: Insecta
- Order: Lepidoptera
- Family: Megalopygidae
- Genus: Megalopyge
- Species: M. perseae

Binomial name
- Megalopyge perseae (Dognin, 1891)

Synonyms
- Gasina perseae Dognin, 1891

Species of moth

Megalopyge perseae is a moth of the Megalopygidae family. It was described by Paul Dognin in 1891. It is found in Venezuela.
