= Megalopyge nuda =

Scientific classification
- Kingdom: Animalia
- Phylum: Arthropoda
- Clade: Pancrustacea
- Class: Insecta
- Order: Lepidoptera
- Family: Megalopygidae
- Genus: Megalopyge
- Species: M. nuda

Binomial name
- Megalopyge nuda (Stoll, 1789)

Synonyms
- Bombyx nuda Stoll, 1789; Megalopyge partheniata Dyar, 1928

Species of moth

Megalopyge nuda is a moth of the Megalopygidae family. It was described by Caspar Stoll in 1789. It is found in Guyana, Paraguay, and Brazil.
