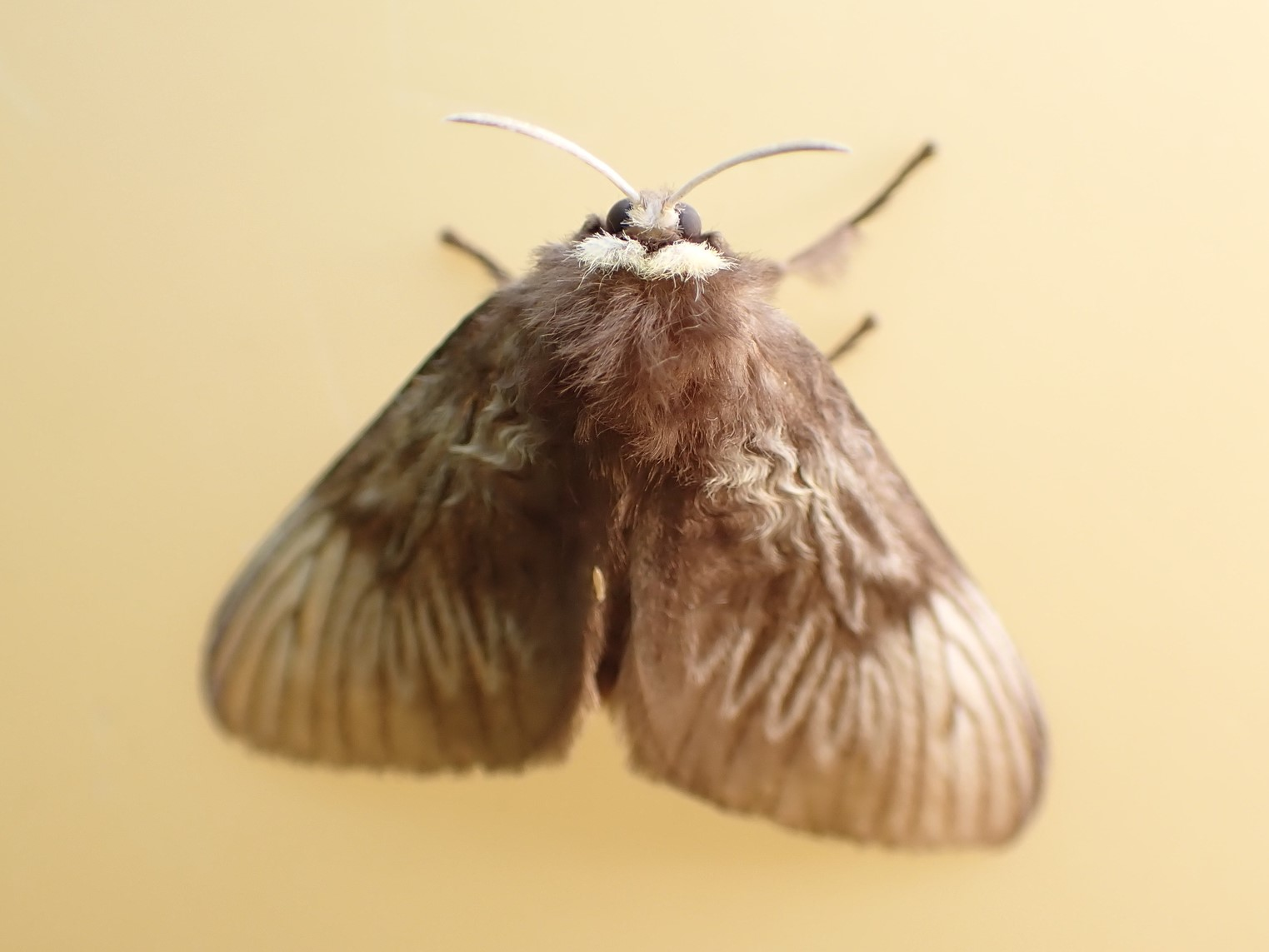

Scientific classification
- Kingdom: Animalia
- Phylum: Arthropoda
- Clade: Pancrustacea
- Class: Insecta
- Order: Lepidoptera
- Family: Megalopygidae
- Genus: Podalia
- Species: P. tympania

Binomial name
- Podalia tympania (H. Druce, 1897)

Synonyms
- Gasina tympania H. Druce, 1897

= Podalia tympania =

Species of moth

Podalia tympania is a species of moth in the family Megalopygidae. It was first described by Herbert Druce in 1897 and has been recorded from Peru and Mexico.

== Description ==
The forewings and hindwings are pale brown, the forewings with the costal margin and the spaces between the veins on the costal half of the wing streaked with white. The fringe of both wings is pale brown.
