= Podalia schadei =

Scientific classification
- Kingdom: Animalia
- Phylum: Arthropoda
- Clade: Pancrustacea
- Class: Insecta
- Order: Lepidoptera
- Family: Megalopygidae
- Genus: Podalia
- Species: P. schadei

Binomial name
- Podalia schadei Schaus, 1924

Species of moth

Podalia schadei is a moth of the Megalopygidae family. It was described by William Schaus in 1924. It is found in Paraguay.

The wingspan is about 47 mm. The forewings are drab with the base below the costa white, extending as a line to the middle of the wing below the subcostal, also a fine white line above the subcostal vein. There is an angled white line at the end of the cell before a drab spot, suffusing beyond it with a white annulus containing a drab spot. There is also a postmedial inbent lunular white line, the points of the lunules slightly produced basad on the veins. The terminal space has fine white lines on the veins, and thicker white streaks on the interspaces, the latter diverging on the termen and enclosing drab spots. The hindwings are rather paler with drab hairs on the inner area and terminal spots on the interspaces.
