= Megalopyge obscura =

Scientific classification
- Kingdom: Animalia
- Phylum: Arthropoda
- Clade: Pancrustacea
- Class: Insecta
- Order: Lepidoptera
- Family: Megalopygidae
- Genus: Megalopyge
- Species: M. obscura

Binomial name
- Megalopyge obscura (Schaus, 1905)

Synonyms
- Cyclara obscura Schaus, 1905

Species of moth

Megalopyge obscura is a moth of the Megalopygidae family. It was described by Schaus in 1905. It is found in French Guiana.

The wingspan is 17 mm. The wings are light greyish brown, the forewings with a broad, diffuse, dark brown postmedial shade, partly edged by wavy whitish lines. There is a black spot at the base and a subterminal black spot at vein 7.
