= Podalia angulata =

Scientific classification
- Kingdom: Animalia
- Phylum: Arthropoda
- Clade: Pancrustacea
- Class: Insecta
- Order: Lepidoptera
- Family: Megalopygidae
- Genus: Podalia
- Species: P. angulata

Binomial name
- Podalia angulata (Hopp, 1922)

Synonyms
- Bedalia angulata Hopp, 1922

Species of moth

Podalia angulata is a moth of the family Megalopygidae. It was described by Walter Hopp in 1922. It is found in Ecuador.
