= Megalopyge hyalina =

Scientific classification
- Kingdom: Animalia
- Phylum: Arthropoda
- Clade: Pancrustacea
- Class: Insecta
- Order: Lepidoptera
- Family: Megalopygidae
- Genus: Megalopyge
- Species: M. hyalina

Binomial name
- Megalopyge hyalina (Schaus, 1905)

Synonyms
- Podalia hyalina Schaus, 1905

Species of moth

Megalopyge hyalina is a moth of the Megalopygidae family. It was described by William Schaus in 1905. It is found in Brazil.

The wingspan is 30 mm. The wings have a glassy appearance, with the veins and costal margin on the forewings light brown with some darker brown at the base and along the inner margin. The inner margin of the hindwings is broadly shaded with blackish brown.
