= Podalia gamelia =

Scientific classification
- Kingdom: Animalia
- Phylum: Arthropoda
- Clade: Pancrustacea
- Class: Insecta
- Order: Lepidoptera
- Family: Megalopygidae
- Genus: Podalia
- Species: P. gamelia

Binomial name
- Podalia gamelia (H. Druce, 1904)

Species of moth

Podalia gamelia is a moth of the family Megalopygidae. It was described by Herbert Druce in 1904.
