= Megalopyge vulpina =

Scientific classification
- Kingdom: Animalia
- Phylum: Arthropoda
- Clade: Pancrustacea
- Class: Insecta
- Order: Lepidoptera
- Family: Megalopygidae
- Genus: Megalopyge
- Species: M. vulpina

Binomial name
- Megalopyge vulpina Schaus, 1900

Species of moth

Megalopyge vulpina is a moth of the family Megalopygidae. It was described by William Schaus in 1900. It is found in Brazil.

The wingspan is about 36 mm. The wings are grey with a subterminal whitish line on the forewings. The fringe is darker.
