= Megalopyge trossula =

Scientific classification
- Kingdom: Animalia
- Phylum: Arthropoda
- Clade: Pancrustacea
- Class: Insecta
- Order: Lepidoptera
- Family: Megalopygidae
- Genus: Megalopyge
- Species: M. trossula

Binomial name
- Megalopyge trossula (Dognin, 1891)

Synonyms
- Prismoptera trossula Dognin, 1891

Species of moth

Megalopyge trossula is a moth of the family Megalopygidae. It was described by Paul Dognin in 1891. It is found in Costa Rica.

Adults have a yellow body and the wings are entirely denuded of scales, except for a few dark-grey ones at the base.
