= Podalia habitus =

Scientific classification
- Kingdom: Animalia
- Phylum: Arthropoda
- Clade: Pancrustacea
- Class: Insecta
- Order: Lepidoptera
- Family: Megalopygidae
- Genus: Podalia
- Species: P. habitus

Binomial name
- Podalia habitus (Hy. Edwards, 1887)

Synonyms
- Bombyx habitus Hy. Edwards, 1887

Species of moth

Podalia habitus is a moth of the family Megalopygidae. It was described by Henry Edwards in 1887. It occurs in Mexico.
