= Megalopyge apicalis =

Scientific classification
- Kingdom: Animalia
- Phylum: Arthropoda
- Clade: Pancrustacea
- Class: Insecta
- Order: Lepidoptera
- Family: Megalopygidae
- Genus: Megalopyge
- Species: M. apicalis

Binomial name
- Megalopyge apicalis (Herrich-Schäffer, 1856)

Species of moth

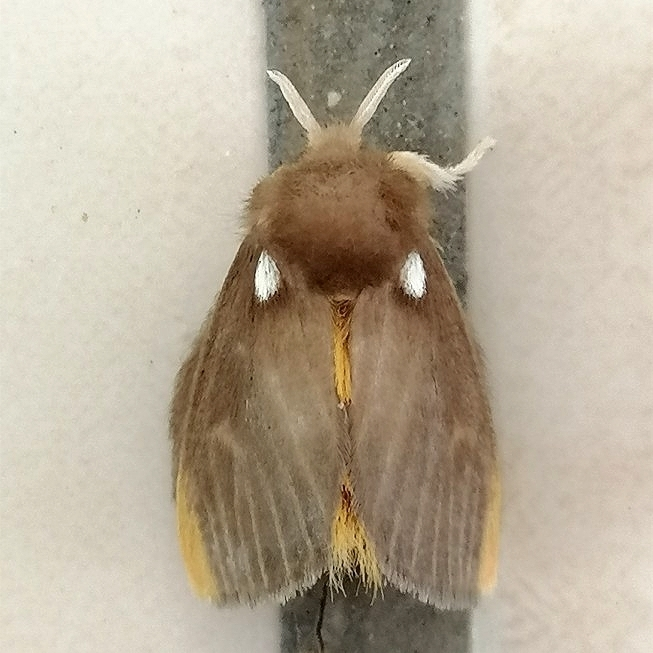
Megalopyge apicalis, 2021

Megalopyge apicalis is a moth of the Megalopygidae family. It was described by Gottlieb August Wilhelm Herrich-Schäffer in 1856.
