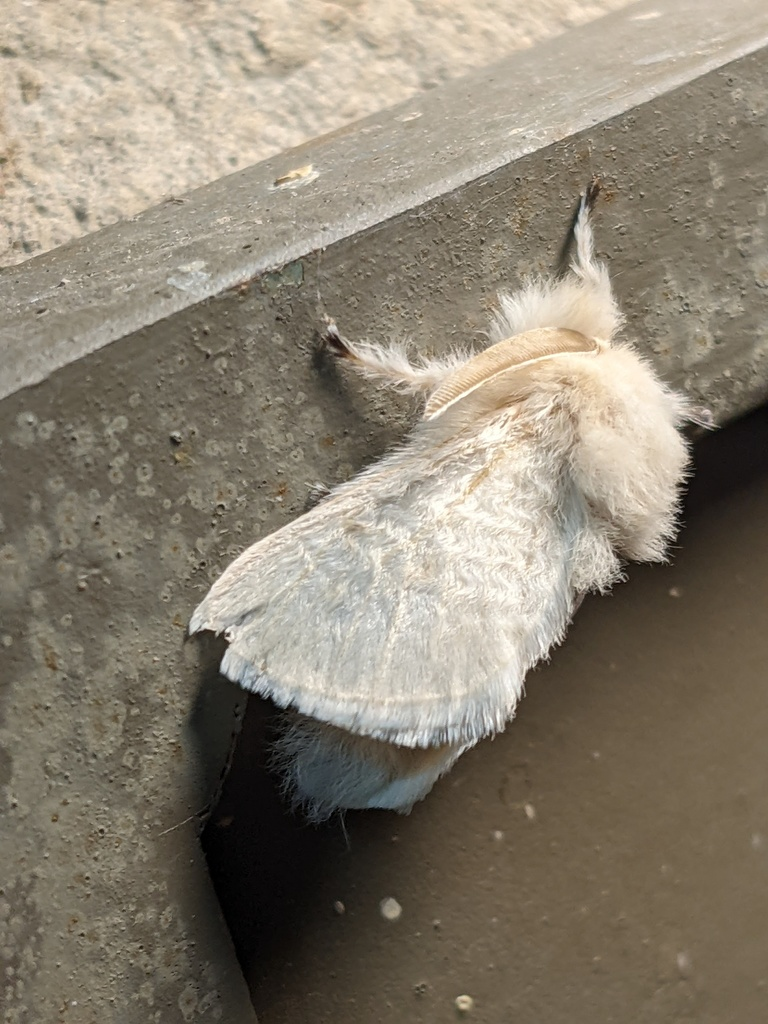

Scientific classification
- Kingdom: Animalia
- Phylum: Arthropoda
- Clade: Pancrustacea
- Class: Insecta
- Order: Lepidoptera
- Family: Megalopygidae
- Genus: Megalopyge
- Species: M. immaculata

Binomial name
- Megalopyge immaculata (Cassino, 1928)

= Megalopyge immaculata =

Species of moth

Megalopyge immaculata is a moth of the family Megalopygidae. It was described by Samuel E. Cassino in 1928.
