= Megalopyge albicollis =

Scientific classification
- Kingdom: Animalia
- Phylum: Arthropoda
- Clade: Pancrustacea
- Class: Insecta
- Order: Lepidoptera
- Family: Megalopygidae
- Genus: Megalopyge
- Species: M. albicollis

Binomial name
- Megalopyge albicollis (Walker, 1855)

Species of moth

Megalopyge albicollis is a moth of the family Megalopygidae. It was described by Francis Walker in 1855.
