= Megalopyge victoriana =

Scientific classification
- Kingdom: Animalia
- Phylum: Arthropoda
- Clade: Pancrustacea
- Class: Insecta
- Order: Lepidoptera
- Family: Megalopygidae
- Genus: Megalopyge
- Species: M. victoriana

Binomial name
- Megalopyge victoriana Schaus, 1927

Species of moth

Megalopyge victoriana is a moth of the family Megalopygidae. It was described by William Schaus in 1927. It is found in Brazil.
