= Podalia annulipes =

Scientific classification
- Kingdom: Animalia
- Phylum: Arthropoda
- Clade: Pancrustacea
- Class: Insecta
- Order: Lepidoptera
- Family: Megalopygidae
- Genus: Podalia
- Species: P. annulipes

Binomial name
- Podalia annulipes (Boisduval, 1833)

Synonyms
- Bombyx annulipes Boisduval, 1833; Malmis interlineata Dyar, 1928

Species of moth

Podalia annulipes is a moth of the family Megalopygidae. It was described by Jean Baptiste Boisduval in 1833. It is found in Brazil.
