= Podalia pedacioides =

Scientific classification
- Kingdom: Animalia
- Phylum: Arthropoda
- Clade: Pancrustacea
- Class: Insecta
- Order: Lepidoptera
- Family: Megalopygidae
- Genus: Podalia
- Species: P. pedacioides

Binomial name
- Podalia pedacioides Dognin, 1916

Species of moth

Podalia pedacioides is a moth in the Megalopygidae family. It was described by Paul Dognin in 1916.
