= Megalopyge ovata =

Scientific classification
- Kingdom: Animalia
- Phylum: Arthropoda
- Clade: Pancrustacea
- Class: Insecta
- Order: Lepidoptera
- Family: Megalopygidae
- Genus: Megalopyge
- Species: M. ovata

Binomial name
- Megalopyge ovata (Schaus, 1896)

Synonyms
- Cyclara ovata Schaus, 1896

Species of moth

Megalopyge ovata is a moth of the Megalopygidae family. It was described by Schaus in 1896. It is found in Brazil.

The wingspan is 19 mm. The wings are rather diaphanous brownish grey, the forewings with a darker basal shade and a median transverse dentate and irregular brown line outwardly edged with white, which is more distinct on the inner half of the wing. There is a small subapical dark brown spot.
