= Megalopyge brunneipennis =

Scientific classification
- Kingdom: Animalia
- Phylum: Arthropoda
- Clade: Pancrustacea
- Class: Insecta
- Order: Lepidoptera
- Family: Megalopygidae
- Genus: Megalopyge
- Species: M. brunneipennis

Binomial name
- Megalopyge brunneipennis (Schaus, 1905)

Synonyms
- Cyclara brunneipennis Schaus, 1905; Lagoa superba Edwards, 1884; Megalopyge vipera Schaus, 1896

Species of moth

Megalopyge brunneipennis is a moth of the family Megalopygidae. It was described by Schaus in 1905. It is found in Brazil.

The wingspan is 53 mm. The forewings are brown, the basal two-thirds with crinkly white scales along the costa, and transverse brownish streaks to the inner margin, and a dark brown spot at the end of the cell. The outer margin is broadly greyish brown without markings. The hindwings are greyish brown.
