= Megalopyge braulio =

Scientific classification
- Kingdom: Animalia
- Phylum: Arthropoda
- Clade: Pancrustacea
- Class: Insecta
- Order: Lepidoptera
- Family: Megalopygidae
- Genus: Megalopyge
- Species: M. braulio

Binomial name
- Megalopyge braulio Schaus, 1924

Species of moth

Megalopyge braulio is a moth of the family Megalopygidae. It was described by William Schaus in 1924. It is found in Paraguay.

The wingspan is about 30 mm for males and 39 mm for females. The male forewings are drab with some white at the base and a bister subbasal point, as well as a white shade at the end of the cell, enclosing a fuscous discal spot. There is a whitish postmedial shade from which white streaks extend on the interspaces to near the termen, the veins terminally finely streaked with white. The basal half of the costa has white streaks above and below the costal vein. The hindwings are whitish, the veins broadly drab. Females have no white on the termen of the forewings, but do have a white wavy line on the basal half of the costa, and the usual crinkly hairs from the base to beyond the middle, the postmedial white hairs forming wavy lines. The hindwings are thinly scaled, with brown hair, the veins slightly darker.
