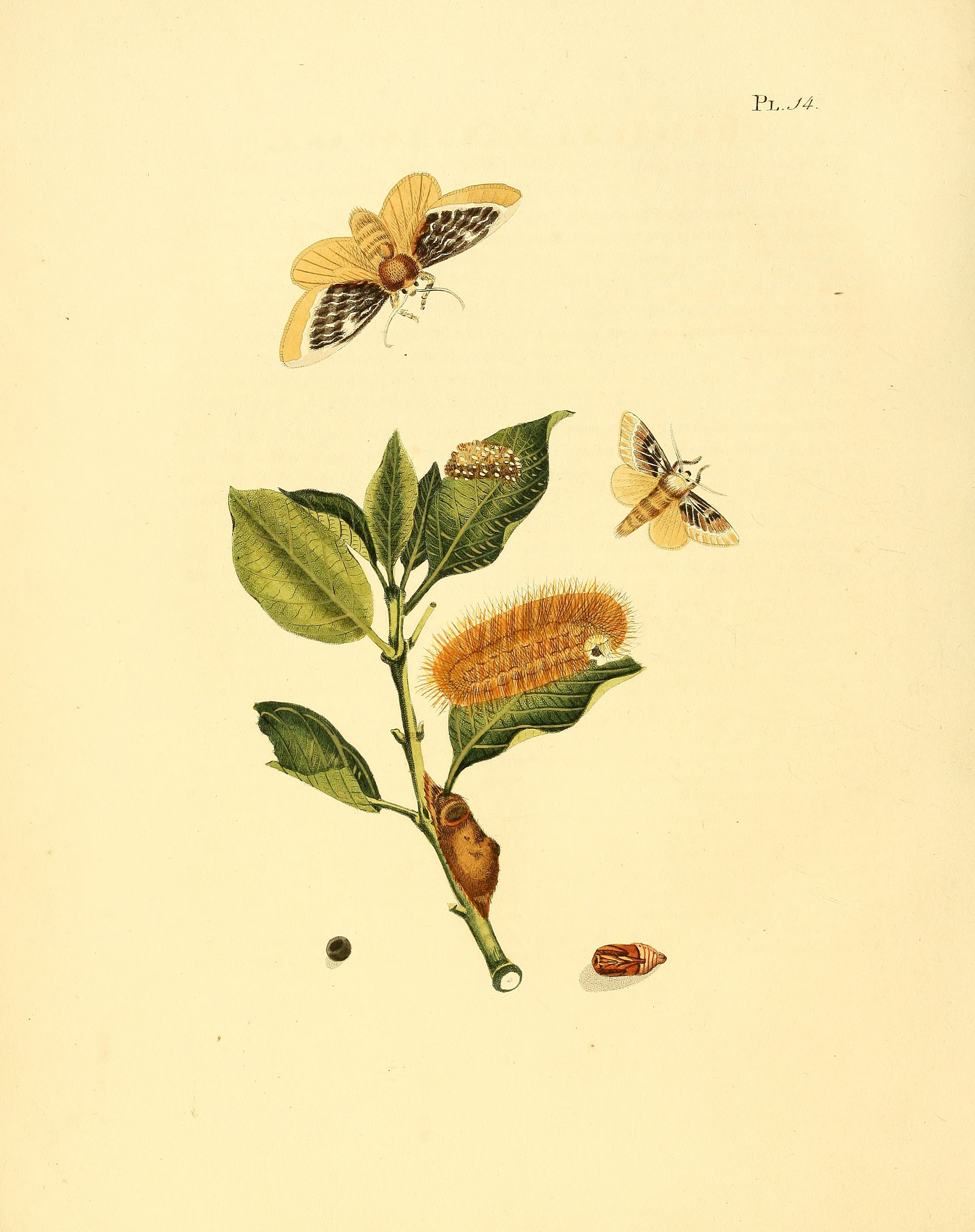

Scientific classification
- Kingdom: Animalia
- Phylum: Arthropoda
- Clade: Pancrustacea
- Class: Insecta
- Order: Lepidoptera
- Family: Megalopygidae
- Genus: Megalopyge
- Species: M. xanthopasa

Binomial name
- Megalopyge xanthopasa (Sepp, 1828)

Synonyms
- Phaleana xanthopasa Sepp, 1828; Megalopyge melaina Hopp, 1935; Lagoa pellita Felder, 1874

= Megalopyge xanthopasa =

Species of moth

Megalopyge xanthopasa is a moth of the family Megalopygidae. It was described by Sepp in 1828. It is found in Suriname and French Guiana.
