= Megalopyge peruana =

Scientific classification
- Kingdom: Animalia
- Phylum: Arthropoda
- Clade: Pancrustacea
- Class: Insecta
- Order: Lepidoptera
- Family: Megalopygidae
- Genus: Megalopyge
- Species: M. peruana

Binomial name
- Megalopyge peruana Hopp, 1935

Species of moth

Megalopyge peruana is a moth of the family Megalopygidae. It was described by Walter Hopp in 1935.
