= Podalia bolivari =

Scientific classification
- Kingdom: Animalia
- Phylum: Arthropoda
- Clade: Pancrustacea
- Class: Insecta
- Order: Lepidoptera
- Family: Megalopygidae
- Genus: Podalia
- Species: P. bolivari

Binomial name
- Podalia bolivari Heylaerts, 1884

Synonyms
- Unduzia gistinda Dyar, 1914; Unduzia phaule Dyar, 1914

Species of moth

Podalia bolivari is a moth of the family Megalopygidae. It was described by Franciscus J. M. Heylaerts in 1884. It is found in Panama and Venezuela.

The wingspan is about 36 mm. Adults are brown with thinly scaled translucent wings. There is a subterminal row of faint yellowish spots between the veins of the forewings.
