= Podalia thanatos =

Scientific classification
- Kingdom: Animalia
- Phylum: Arthropoda
- Clade: Pancrustacea
- Class: Insecta
- Order: Lepidoptera
- Family: Megalopygidae
- Genus: Podalia
- Species: P. thanatos

Binomial name
- Podalia thanatos Schaus, 1905

Species of moth

Podalia thanatos is a moth of the Megalopygidae family. It was described by William Schaus in 1905. It is found in Costa Rica and Guyana.

The wingspan is 31 mm. The forewings are black, with the apex and outer margin grey white, crossed by pale olivaceous brown veins. There is a subterminal row of black spots. The base and inner margin of the hindwings are broadly black, otherwise grey-white crossed by pale olivaceous brown veins.
