= Podalia amarga =

Scientific classification
- Kingdom: Animalia
- Phylum: Arthropoda
- Clade: Pancrustacea
- Class: Insecta
- Order: Lepidoptera
- Family: Megalopygidae
- Genus: Podalia
- Species: P. amarga

Binomial name
- Podalia amarga (Schaus, 1905)

Synonyms
- Cyclara amarga Schaus, 1905; Gois nigrescens Schaus, 1905; Megalopyge farmbri Kaye, 1924

Species of moth

Podalia amarga is a moth of the family Megalopygidae. It was described by Schaus in 1905.

== Description ==
The wingspan is 22 mm. The forewings are brownish black with the apex broadly and the outer margin narrowly light greyish buff. There is a postmedial whitish line, oblique from costa at two-thirds from the base to vein 5, then deeply dentate to vein 2, and wavy to the inner margin. Separating the dark and light portions is a marginal row of triangular blackish spots, preceded at vein 7 by another spot. The hindwings are smoky black, becoming paler on the outer margin.
