= Podalia walkeri =

Scientific classification
- Kingdom: Animalia
- Phylum: Arthropoda
- Clade: Pancrustacea
- Class: Insecta
- Order: Lepidoptera
- Family: Megalopygidae
- Genus: Podalia
- Species: P. walkeri

Binomial name
- Podalia walkeri (Berg, 1882)

Synonyms
- Megalopyge walkeri Berg, 1882; Megalopyge fieldia Schaus, 1896; Podalia nigricostata Dognin, 1912; Malmis semialba Hopp, 1922

Species of moth

Podalia walkeri is a moth of the Megalopygidae family. It was described by Carlos Berg in 1882 and is found in Brazil.

The wingspan is 45 mm. The forewings have the basal half brown except the costa which is white with a few long brown streaks. There is a dark brown spot at the end of the cell and the outer half of the wing is brown with the veins whitish and two transverse white lines breaking the brown up into irregular spots. There are also some white longitudinal streaks between the veins on the outer margin. The hindwings are brown, but white at the base of the costal margin. There are some whitish spots on the fringe.
