= Megalopyge dyari =

Scientific classification
- Kingdom: Animalia
- Phylum: Arthropoda
- Clade: Pancrustacea
- Class: Insecta
- Order: Lepidoptera
- Family: Megalopygidae
- Genus: Megalopyge
- Species: M. dyari

Binomial name
- Megalopyge dyari Hopp, 1935

Species of moth

Megalopyge dyari is a moth of the family Megalopygidae. It was described by Walter Hopp in 1935. It is found in Mexico.
