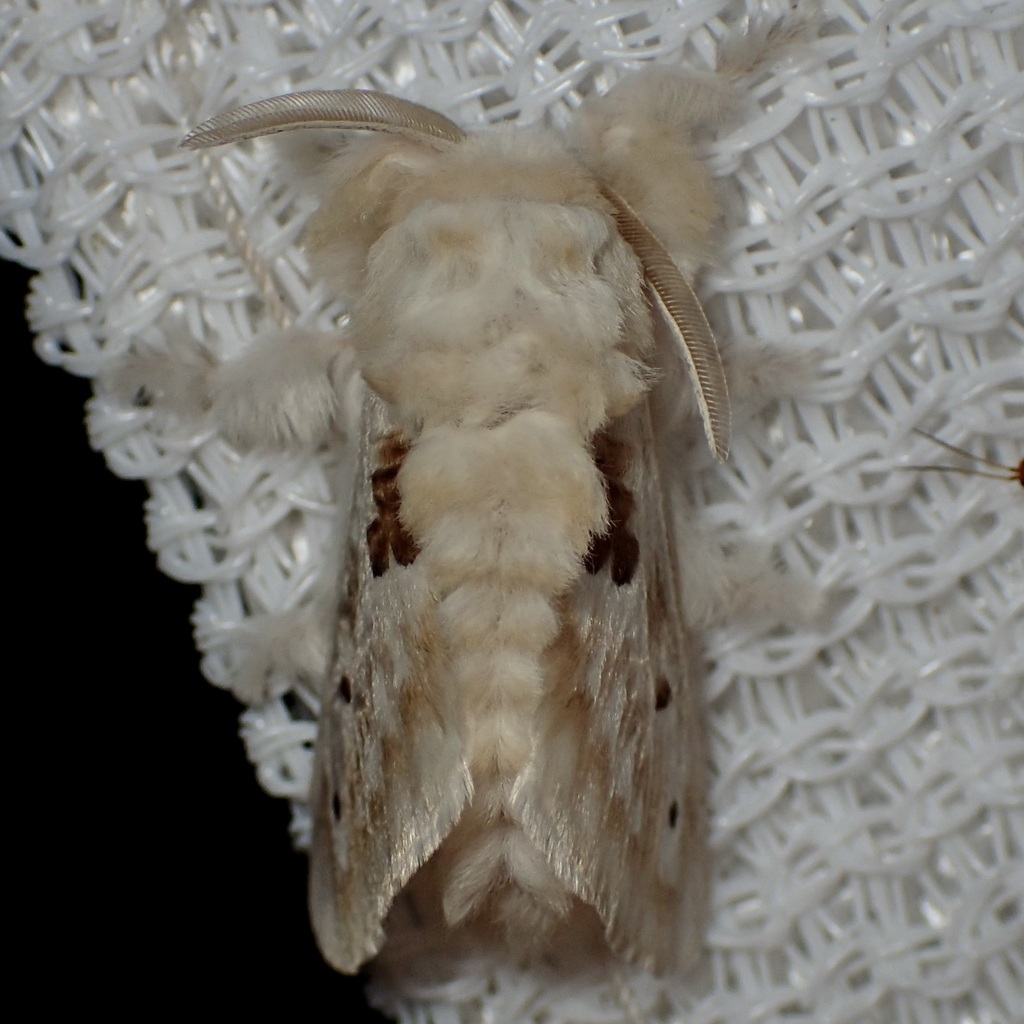

Scientific classification
- Kingdom: Animalia
- Phylum: Arthropoda
- Clade: Pancrustacea
- Class: Insecta
- Order: Lepidoptera
- Family: Megalopygidae
- Genus: Megalopyge
- Species: M. lapena

Binomial name
- Megalopyge lapena Schaus, 1896

Synonyms
- Megalopyge cyrtota Dyar, 1910; Megalopyge heteropuncta Barnes & McDunnough, 1918

= Megalopyge lapena =

Species of moth

Megalopyge lapena is a moth of the family Megalopygidae. It was described by Schaus in 1896. It is found in Mexico and southern Arizona.

The wingspan is 35 mm. The forewings are very pale brownish grey, whiter beyond the cell and between the veins near the outer margin. At the end of the cell is a small reddish brown spot and below the median vein is a large reddish brown spot composed of long crinkly scales. The hindwings and underside are yellowish white.
