= Podalia dyari =

Scientific classification
- Kingdom: Animalia
- Phylum: Arthropoda
- Clade: Pancrustacea
- Class: Insecta
- Order: Lepidoptera
- Family: Megalopygidae
- Genus: Podalia
- Species: P. dyari

Binomial name
- Podalia dyari (Joicey & Talbot)

Species of moth

Podalia dyari is a moth of the Megalopygidae family. It was described by James John Joicey and George Talbot.
