= Podalia walkerensis =

Scientific classification
- Kingdom: Animalia
- Phylum: Arthropoda
- Clade: Pancrustacea
- Class: Insecta
- Order: Lepidoptera
- Family: Megalopygidae
- Genus: Podalia
- Species: P. walkerensis

Binomial name
- Podalia walkerensis Hopp, 1935

Synonyms
- Ocha dimidiata Walker, 1865 (preocc.)

Species of moth

Podalia walkerensis is a moth of the family Megalopygidae. It was described by Walter Hopp in 1935. It is found in Peru.
