= Megalopyge amita =

Scientific classification
- Kingdom: Animalia
- Phylum: Arthropoda
- Clade: Pancrustacea
- Class: Insecta
- Order: Lepidoptera
- Family: Megalopygidae
- Genus: Megalopyge
- Species: M. amita

Binomial name
- Megalopyge amita Schaus, 1900

Species of moth

Megalopyge amita is a moth of the family Megalopygidae. It was described by William Schaus in 1900. It is found in Brazil.

The wingspan is about 36 mm. The forewings are covered with dark lilacine-grey wavy hairs. The apex and outer margin are pale yellow and there is a large yellow space on the inner margin at the base. The hindwings are lilacine grey, with the outer margin narrowly yellow.
