= Megalopyge amitina =

Scientific classification
- Kingdom: Animalia
- Phylum: Arthropoda
- Clade: Pancrustacea
- Class: Insecta
- Order: Lepidoptera
- Family: Megalopygidae
- Genus: Megalopyge
- Species: M. amitina

Binomial name
- Megalopyge amitina Dognin, 1912

Species of moth

Megalopyge amitina is a moth of the family Megalopygidae. It was described by Paul Dognin in 1912. It is found in South America.
