= Megalopyge chrysocoma =

Scientific classification
- Kingdom: Animalia
- Phylum: Arthropoda
- Clade: Pancrustacea
- Class: Insecta
- Order: Lepidoptera
- Family: Megalopygidae
- Genus: Megalopyge
- Species: M. chrysocoma

Binomial name
- Megalopyge chrysocoma (Herrich-Schäffer, 1856)

Synonyms
- Chrysopyga chrysocoma Herrich-Schäffer, 1856; Megalopyge aricia Schaus, 1904

Species of moth

Megalopyge chrysocoma is a moth of the Megalopygidae family. It was described by Gottlieb August Wilhelm Herrich-Schäffer in 1856. It is found in Venezuela.

The wingspan is 35 mm. The body is golden brown and the tarsi black. The forewings are grey, the basal half with undulating darker scales. There is an indistinct quadrate spot in the cell and an indistinct subterminal whitish shade, as well as a terminal dark line. The fringe is dark grey. The hindwings are whitish, with the veins and fringe grey. There are some light brown hairs on the inner margin.
