= Megalopyge lecca =

Scientific classification
- Kingdom: Animalia
- Phylum: Arthropoda
- Clade: Pancrustacea
- Class: Insecta
- Order: Lepidoptera
- Family: Megalopygidae
- Genus: Megalopyge
- Species: M. lecca

Binomial name
- Megalopyge lecca (H. Druce, 1890)

Species of moth

Megalopyge lecca is a moth of the family Megalopygidae. It was described by Herbert Druce in 1890.
