= Megalopyge lanceolata =

Scientific classification
- Kingdom: Animalia
- Phylum: Arthropoda
- Clade: Pancrustacea
- Class: Insecta
- Order: Lepidoptera
- Family: Megalopygidae
- Genus: Megalopyge
- Species: M. lanceolata

Binomial name
- Megalopyge lanceolata Dognin, 1923

Species of moth

Megalopyge lanceolata is a moth of the family Megalopygidae. It was described by Paul Dognin in 1923.
