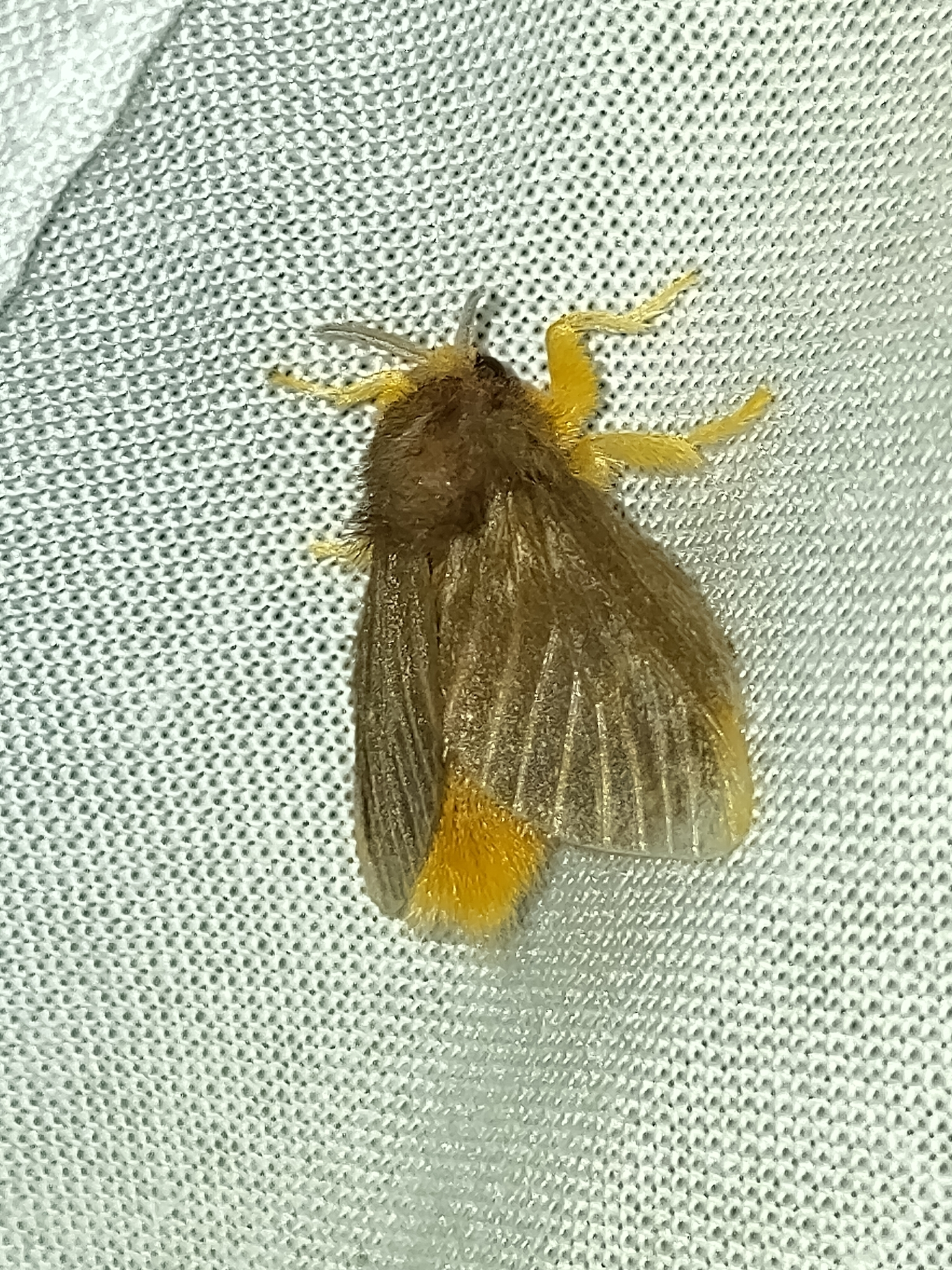

Scientific classification
- Kingdom: Animalia
- Phylum: Arthropoda
- Clade: Pancrustacea
- Class: Insecta
- Order: Lepidoptera
- Family: Megalopygidae
- Genus: Megalopyge
- Species: M. hina

Binomial name
- Megalopyge hina (Dognin, 1911)

Synonyms
- Zebonda hina Dognin, 1911

= Megalopyge hina =

Species of moth

Megalopyge hina is a moth of the Megalopygidae family. It was described by Paul Dognin in 1911. It is found from Guyana to Ecuador.
