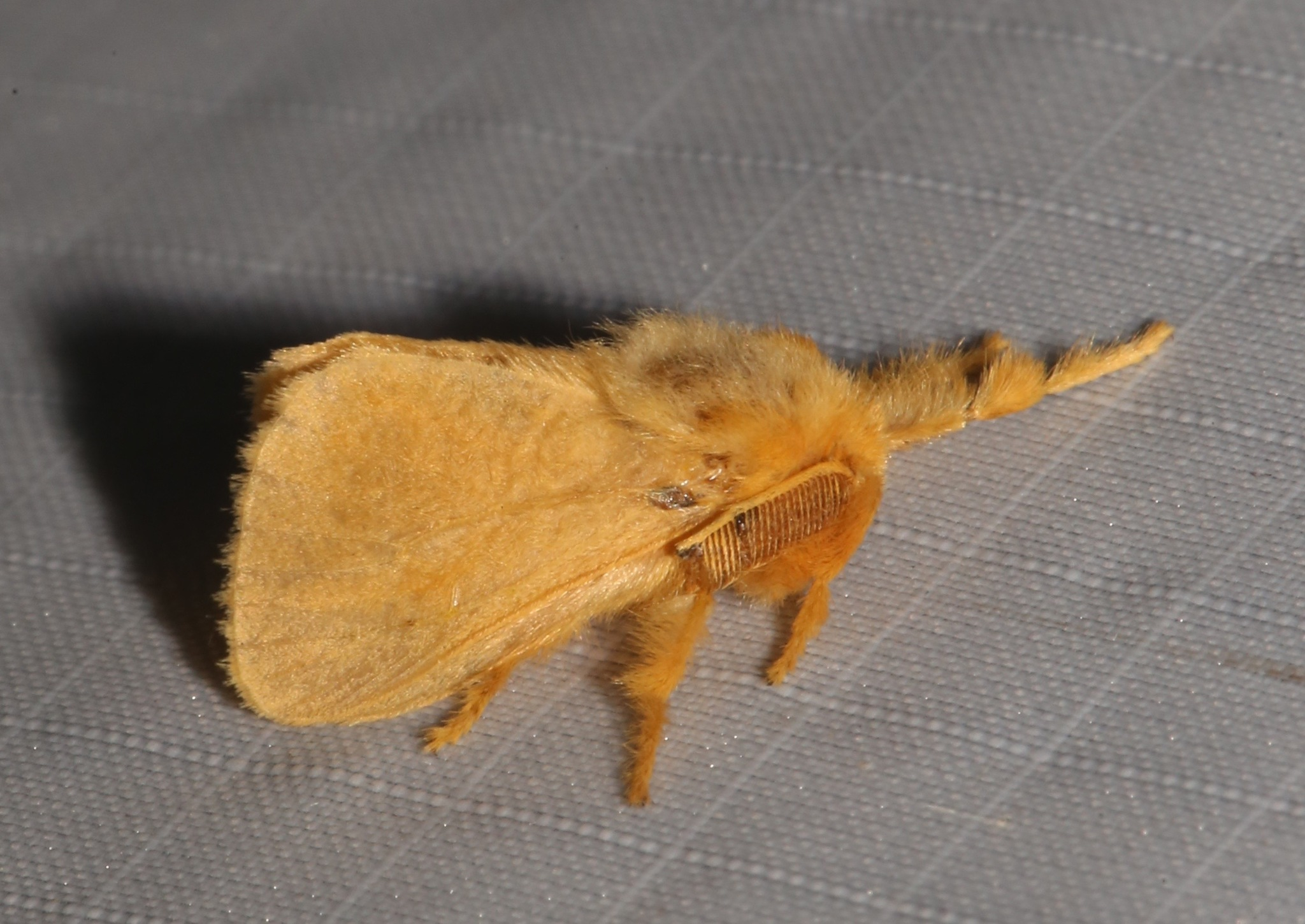

Scientific classification
- Kingdom: Animalia
- Phylum: Arthropoda
- Clade: Pancrustacea
- Class: Insecta
- Order: Lepidoptera
- Family: Megalopygidae
- Genus: Megalopyge
- Species: M. pixidifera

Binomial name
- Megalopyge pixidifera (Smith & Abbot, 1797)

Synonyms
- Phalaena pixidifera Smith & Abbot, 1797; Miresa subcitrina Walker, 1869

= Megalopyge pixidifera =

Species of moth

Megalopyge pixidifera is a moth of the Megalopygidae family. It was described by James Edward Smith and John Abbot in 1797. It was described from the southern United States.
