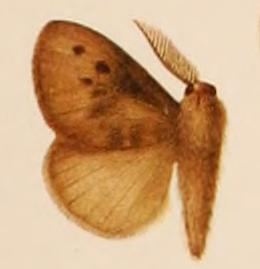

Scientific classification
- Kingdom: Animalia
- Phylum: Arthropoda
- Clade: Pancrustacea
- Class: Insecta
- Order: Lepidoptera
- Family: Megalopygidae
- Genus: Podalia
- Species: P. marmorata

Binomial name
- Podalia marmorata (Rothschild, 1910)

Synonyms
- Antarctia marmorata Rothschild, 1910; Megalopyge marmorata; Podalia cirrata Hopp, 1935

= Podalia marmorata =

Species of moth

Podalia marmorata is a moth of the family Megalopygidae. It is found in South America, including Peru.
