= Megalopyge ravida =

Scientific classification
- Kingdom: Animalia
- Phylum: Arthropoda
- Clade: Pancrustacea
- Class: Insecta
- Order: Lepidoptera
- Family: Megalopygidae
- Genus: Megalopyge
- Species: M. ravida

Binomial name
- Megalopyge ravida (H. Druce, 1887)

Synonyms
- Lagoa ravida H. Druce, 1887

Species of moth

Megalopyge ravida is a moth of the family Megalopygidae. It was described by Herbert Druce in 1887. It is found in Mexico.

The wingspan is about 25 mm. The forewings and hindwings are white, the forewings shaded with brown from the base to about the middle and beyond crossed from the costal margin to near the inner margin by a row of indistinct brown spots. The head and thorax are dusty and the abdomen is whitish.
