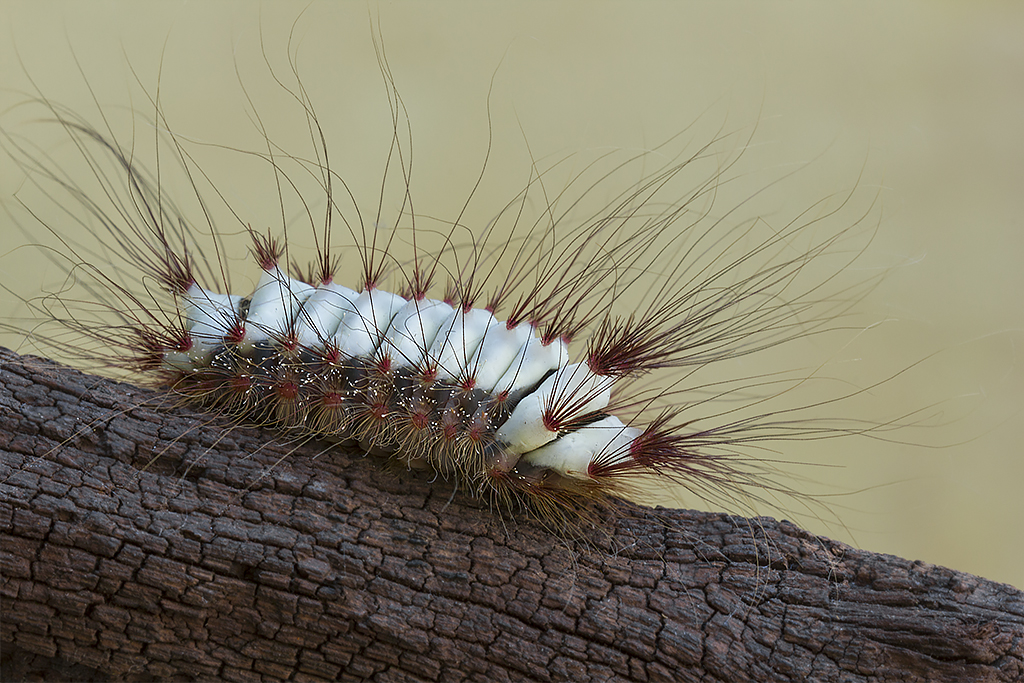
- Megalopyge lanata

Scientific classification
- Kingdom: Animalia
- Phylum: Arthropoda
- Clade: Pancrustacea
- Class: Insecta
- Order: Lepidoptera
- Family: Megalopygidae
- Genus: Megalopyge
- Species: M. lanata

Binomial name
- Megalopyge lanata (Stoll, 1780)

= Megalopyge lanata =

Species of moth

Megalopyge lanata is a moth of the family Megalopygidae. It was described by Caspar Stoll in 1780.
