= Podalia guaya =

Scientific classification
- Kingdom: Animalia
- Phylum: Arthropoda
- Clade: Pancrustacea
- Class: Insecta
- Order: Lepidoptera
- Family: Megalopygidae
- Genus: Podalia
- Species: P. guaya

Binomial name
- Podalia guaya (Schaus, 1927)

Synonyms
- Megalopyge guaya Schaus, 1927

Species of moth

Podalia guaya is a moth of the Megalopygidae family. It was described by William Schaus in 1927. It is found in Paraguay.
