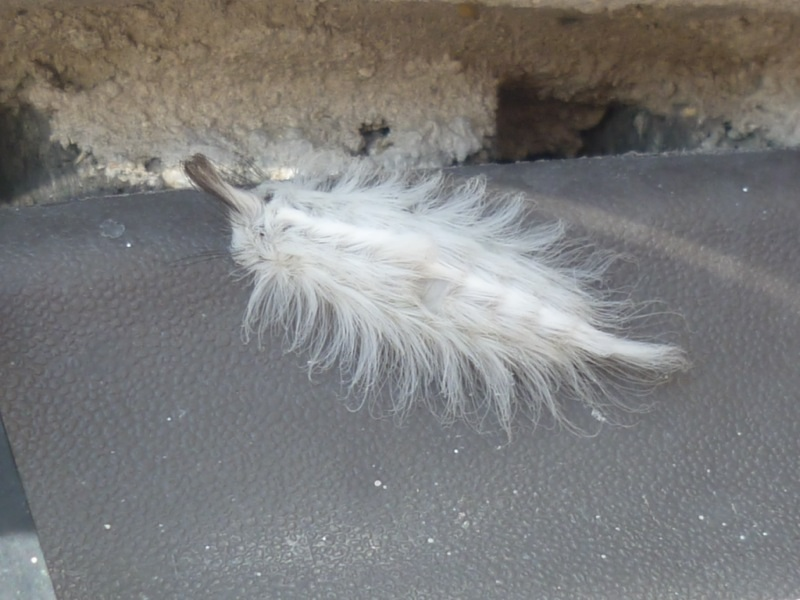

Scientific classification
- Kingdom: Animalia
- Phylum: Arthropoda
- Clade: Pancrustacea
- Class: Insecta
- Order: Lepidoptera
- Family: Megalopygidae
- Genus: Megalopyge
- Species: M. krugii

Binomial name
- Megalopyge krugii (Dewitz, 1897)

= Megalopyge krugii =

Species of moth

Megalopyge krugii is a moth of the family Megalopygidae. It was described by Hermann Dewitz in 1897.

Found in Puerto Rico, hundreds may congregate together, and contact with the skin will cause a stinging sensation.
