= Podalia pellucens =

Scientific classification
- Kingdom: Animalia
- Phylum: Arthropoda
- Clade: Pancrustacea
- Class: Insecta
- Order: Lepidoptera
- Family: Megalopygidae
- Genus: Podalia
- Species: P. pellucens

Binomial name
- Podalia pellucens Dognin

Species of moth

Podalia pellucens is a moth of the Megalopygidae family. It was described by Paul Dognin.
