= Megalopyge uruguayensis =

Scientific classification
- Kingdom: Animalia
- Phylum: Arthropoda
- Clade: Pancrustacea
- Class: Insecta
- Order: Lepidoptera
- Family: Megalopygidae
- Genus: Megalopyge
- Species: M. uruguayensis

Binomial name
- Megalopyge uruguayensis Berg, 1882

Synonyms
- Megalopyge chacona Schaus, 1920

Species of moth

Megalopyge uruguayensis is a moth of the family Megalopygidae. It was described by Carlos Berg in 1882. It is found in Uruguay and Argentina.

The wingspan is about 30 mm. The forewings are fuscous, shaded with grey about the tornus. The veins are all white and there is a white shade at the end of the cell, joined by a postmedial white shade from the costa, partly cutting off a portion of the dark ground colour. There is also a postmedial interveinal white streak. The hindwings are white with fuscous scaling on the inner margin and the terminal space is broadly fuscous, cut by white veins.
