= Megalopyge tharops =

Scientific classification
- Kingdom: Animalia
- Phylum: Arthropoda
- Clade: Pancrustacea
- Class: Insecta
- Order: Lepidoptera
- Family: Megalopygidae
- Genus: Megalopyge
- Species: M. tharops

Binomial name
- Megalopyge tharops (Stoll, 1782)

Synonyms
- Attacus tharops Stoll, 1782; Podalia multicollis Schaus, 1905

Species of moth

Megalopyge tharops is a moth of the family Megalopygidae. It was described by Caspar Stoll in 1782. It is found in French Guiana and Brazil.

The wingspan is 31 mm. The forewings are white, with the cell and space below it streaked with grey. The costa is streaked with black for two-thirds from the base and there is a black streak along the median to the end of the cell, as well as an oblique black shade from the cell at vein 2 to near the inner angle. The discocellular is black and the veins on the outer portion are edged with light greyish brown. The fringe is brownish. The hindwings are white, with the inner margin broadly pale brown.
