= Podalia prolecta =

Scientific classification
- Kingdom: Animalia
- Phylum: Arthropoda
- Clade: Pancrustacea
- Class: Insecta
- Order: Lepidoptera
- Family: Megalopygidae
- Genus: Podalia
- Species: P. prolecta

Binomial name
- Podalia prolecta (Hopp, 1935)

Species of moth

Podalia prolecta is a moth of the family Megalopygidae. It was described by Walter Hopp in 1935.
