= Megalopyge undulata =

Scientific classification
- Kingdom: Animalia
- Phylum: Arthropoda
- Clade: Pancrustacea
- Class: Insecta
- Order: Lepidoptera
- Family: Megalopygidae
- Genus: Megalopyge
- Species: M. undulata

Binomial name
- Megalopyge undulata (Herrich-Schäffer, 1858)

Synonyms
- Chrysopyga undulata Herrich-Schäffer, 1858; Megalopyge fuliginosa Moore, 1883; Megalopyge sevarina Schaus, 1927; Megalopyge vulpina Berg, 1878

Species of moth

Megalopyge undulata is a moth of the family Megalopygidae. It was described by Gottlieb August Wilhelm Herrich-Schäffer in 1858. It is found in Brazil, Paraguay and Argentina.
