= Podalia intermaculata =

Scientific classification
- Kingdom: Animalia
- Phylum: Arthropoda
- Clade: Pancrustacea
- Class: Insecta
- Order: Lepidoptera
- Family: Megalopygidae
- Genus: Podalia
- Species: P. intermaculata

Binomial name
- Podalia intermaculata Dognin, 1916

Synonyms
- Bedalia intermaculata Dognin, 1916; Bedalia vicina Hopp, 1926

Species of moth

Podalia intermaculata is a moth of the Megalopygidae family. It was described by Paul Dognin in 1916.
