= Podalia lanocrispa =

Scientific classification
- Kingdom: Animalia
- Phylum: Arthropoda
- Clade: Pancrustacea
- Class: Insecta
- Order: Lepidoptera
- Family: Megalopygidae
- Genus: Podalia
- Species: P. lanocrispa

Binomial name
- Podalia lanocrispa (E. D. Jones, 1912)

Synonyms
- Megalopyge lanocrispa E. D. Jones, 1912

Species of moth

Podalia lanocrispa is a moth of the family Megalopygidae. It was described by E. Dukinfield Jones in 1912. It is found in Brazil.

The wingspan is about 40 mm. The forewings are ochreous white with the costa and inner margin ochreous and the veins light brown. There is a diffused dark discocellular spot and a postmedial brown band followed by a lighter shade, excurved from vein 9 to vein 2, where it is slightly bent outwards and straight to vein lb. There are five wavy black fasciae from the base, one on the subcostal nervure, two in the cell, the lower one reaching to above the origin of vein 2, one slightly shorter just below the median nervure and one above lb. There is also a short dark streak at each side of the veins on the terminal area and a brown terminal line, broken at the veins. The hindwings are ochreous with the veins and inner area suffused with yellowish brown.
