= Megalopyge urens =

Scientific classification
- Kingdom: Animalia
- Phylum: Arthropoda
- Clade: Pancrustacea
- Class: Insecta
- Order: Lepidoptera
- Family: Megalopygidae
- Genus: Megalopyge
- Species: M. urens

Binomial name
- Megalopyge urens Berg, 1882

Species of moth

Megalopyge urens is a moth of the family Megalopygidae. It was described by Carlos Berg in 1882. It is found in Brazil.
