= Megalopyge radiata =

Scientific classification
- Kingdom: Animalia
- Phylum: Arthropoda
- Clade: Pancrustacea
- Class: Insecta
- Order: Lepidoptera
- Family: Megalopygidae
- Genus: Megalopyge
- Species: M. radiata

Binomial name
- Megalopyge radiata Schaus, 1892

Synonyms
- Megalopyge flavivertex Schaus, 1921

Species of moth

Megalopyge radiata is a moth of the family Megalopygidae. It was described by William Schaus in 1892. It is found in Mexico and Brazil.

The wingspan is 54 mm. Adults are brown, the basal half of the forewings below the median vein much darker and outwardly bordered with white, where white lines extend towards the outer margin. At the end of the cell is a large velvety brown spot and beyond the cell white lines radiate towards the apex and outer margin. The hindwings are brown.
