= Podalia cincinnata =

Scientific classification
- Kingdom: Animalia
- Phylum: Arthropoda
- Clade: Pancrustacea
- Class: Insecta
- Order: Lepidoptera
- Family: Megalopygidae
- Genus: Podalia
- Species: P. cincinnata

Binomial name
- Podalia cincinnata (Dognin, 1922)

Synonyms
- Repnoa cincinnata Dognin, 1922

Species of moth

Podalia cincinnata is a moth of the Megalopygidae family. It was described by Paul Dognin in 1922.
