= Megalopyge megalopygae =

Scientific classification
- Kingdom: Animalia
- Phylum: Arthropoda
- Clade: Pancrustacea
- Class: Insecta
- Order: Lepidoptera
- Family: Megalopygidae
- Genus: Megalopyge
- Species: M. megalopygae

Binomial name
- Megalopyge megalopygae (Schaus, 1905)

Synonyms
- Edebessa megalopygae Schaus, 1905

Species of moth

Megalopyge megalopygae is a moth of the Megalopygidae family. It was described by Schaus in 1905. It is found in French Guiana.

== Characteristics ==
The wingspan is about 48 mm. The forewings are dark grey with long curly hairs, becoming olivaceous brown at the base and along the inner margin. The apex and outer margin are golden olivaceous buff. The hindwings are dark grey with the outer margin narrowly and the fringe golden olivaceous buff.
