= Megalopyge torva =

Scientific classification
- Kingdom: Animalia
- Phylum: Arthropoda
- Clade: Pancrustacea
- Class: Insecta
- Order: Lepidoptera
- Family: Megalopygidae
- Genus: Megalopyge
- Species: M. torva

Binomial name
- Megalopyge torva Schaus, 1912

Species of moth

Megalopyge torva is a moth of the family Megalopygidae. It was described by Schaus in 1912. It is found in Costa Rica.

The wingspan is 50 mm. The forewings are fuscous grey tinged with brown, with a white patch at the base between the median and the submedian containing a fuscous streak. There is a white streak in the cell and the postmedial space is white, outwardly dentate between the veins with whitish streaks on the veins, and dark streaks between the veins, not reaching the angles. There are dark expanding shadings to the white streaks on the veins, chiefly noticeable towards the apex. The hindwings are grey-brown, with the veins darker.
