= Megalopyge affinis =

Scientific classification
- Kingdom: Animalia
- Phylum: Arthropoda
- Clade: Pancrustacea
- Class: Insecta
- Order: Lepidoptera
- Family: Megalopygidae
- Genus: Megalopyge
- Species: M. affinis

Binomial name
- Megalopyge affinis (H. Druce, 1887)

Synonyms
- Lagoa affinis H. Druce, 1887

Species of moth

Megalopyge affinis is a moth of the family Megalopygidae. It was described by Herbert Druce in 1887. It is found in Mexico.

The forewings and hindwings are uniform cream white with a few black scales along the margin of the hindwings. The head, thorax and abdomen are cream white.
