= Podalia mallas =

Scientific classification
- Kingdom: Animalia
- Phylum: Arthropoda
- Clade: Pancrustacea
- Class: Insecta
- Order: Lepidoptera
- Family: Megalopygidae
- Genus: Podalia
- Species: P. mallas

Binomial name
- Podalia mallas (H. Druce, 1899)

Synonyms
- Megalopyge mallas H. Druce, 1899; Bedalia corops Dyar, 1910

Species of moth

Podalia mallas is a moth of the family Megalopygidae. It was described by Herbert Druce in 1899. It is found in Brazil.

The wingspan is about 30 mm. The wings are light brown, the forewings woolly toward the base and the costa shaded with white to across the cell and an outer straight white line across the wing. The veins are narrowly dark with two dark-brown spots at the extreme base of the wing. The hindwings are without marks.
