= Podalia albescens =

Scientific classification
- Kingdom: Animalia
- Phylum: Arthropoda
- Clade: Pancrustacea
- Class: Insecta
- Order: Lepidoptera
- Family: Megalopygidae
- Genus: Podalia
- Species: P. albescens

Binomial name
- Podalia albescens (Schaus, 1900)

Synonyms
- Megalopyge albescens Schaus, 1900

Species of moth

Podalia albescens is a moth of the family Megalopygidae. It was described by William Schaus in 1900. It is found in Brazil.

The wingspan is about 48 mm. The body is white with transverse dark grey lines. The forewings are white with some dark grey spots at the base and an inner transverse row of smoky black spots extending on the costa as far as the end of the cell. There is a narrow grey outer band, partly obsolete and broken by the veins, as well as a subterminal row of large grey spots, partly filled in with white. There is also a terminal row of dark grey spots. The hindwings are white with a terminal row of small grey spots.
