= Podalia nivosa =

Scientific classification
- Kingdom: Animalia
- Phylum: Arthropoda
- Clade: Pancrustacea
- Class: Insecta
- Order: Lepidoptera
- Family: Megalopygidae
- Genus: Podalia
- Species: P. nivosa

Binomial name
- Podalia nivosa (E. D. Jones, 1912)

Synonyms
- Megalopyge nivosa E. D. Jones, 1912

Species of moth

Podalia nivosa is a moth of the family Megalopygidae. It was described by E. Dukinfield Jones in 1912. It is found in Brazil.

The wingspan is about 36 mm. The forewings are white with the base of the costa, the veins and medial area below the median nervure brown and the terminal area suffused with brown. There is a group of dark brown spots at the base and there are two dark brown streaks in the cell, as well as a brown fascia on the median nervure, broadening at the end of the cell from vein 3 to 5. A triangular dark brown spot is found on the discocellulars and there is a small brown mark at the origin of vein 8, as well as a diffused brown terminal line. The hindwings are ochreous with the veins and hairs on the inner area brown.
