= Podalia pseudopedacia =

Scientific classification
- Kingdom: Animalia
- Phylum: Arthropoda
- Clade: Pancrustacea
- Class: Insecta
- Order: Lepidoptera
- Family: Megalopygidae
- Genus: Podalia
- Species: P. pseudopedacia

Binomial name
- Podalia pseudopedacia Dognin, 1916

Species of moth

Podalia pseudopedacia is a moth of the Megalopygidae family. It was described by Paul Dognin in 1916.
