= Megalopyge salebrosa =

Scientific classification
- Kingdom: Animalia
- Phylum: Arthropoda
- Clade: Pancrustacea
- Class: Insecta
- Order: Lepidoptera
- Family: Megalopygidae
- Genus: Megalopyge
- Species: M. salebrosa

Binomial name
- Megalopyge salebrosa (Clemens, 1860)

Synonyms
- Oylothrix salebrosa Clemens, 1860; Gasina agdamea Druce, 1890

Species of moth

Megalopyge salebrosa is a moth of the Megalopygidae family. It was described by James Brackenridge Clemens in 1860. It is found in Mexico and Guatemala.

The forewings are pale yellowish brown, shaded with dark brown at the end of the cell and near the base. The costal margin is white, the veins beyond the cell white edged with dark brown, the inner margin near the base of the wing yellowish brown. The hindwings are pale cream-colour, darkest at the base and along the inner margin. Females are considerably larger than males and have much less white on the forewings.
