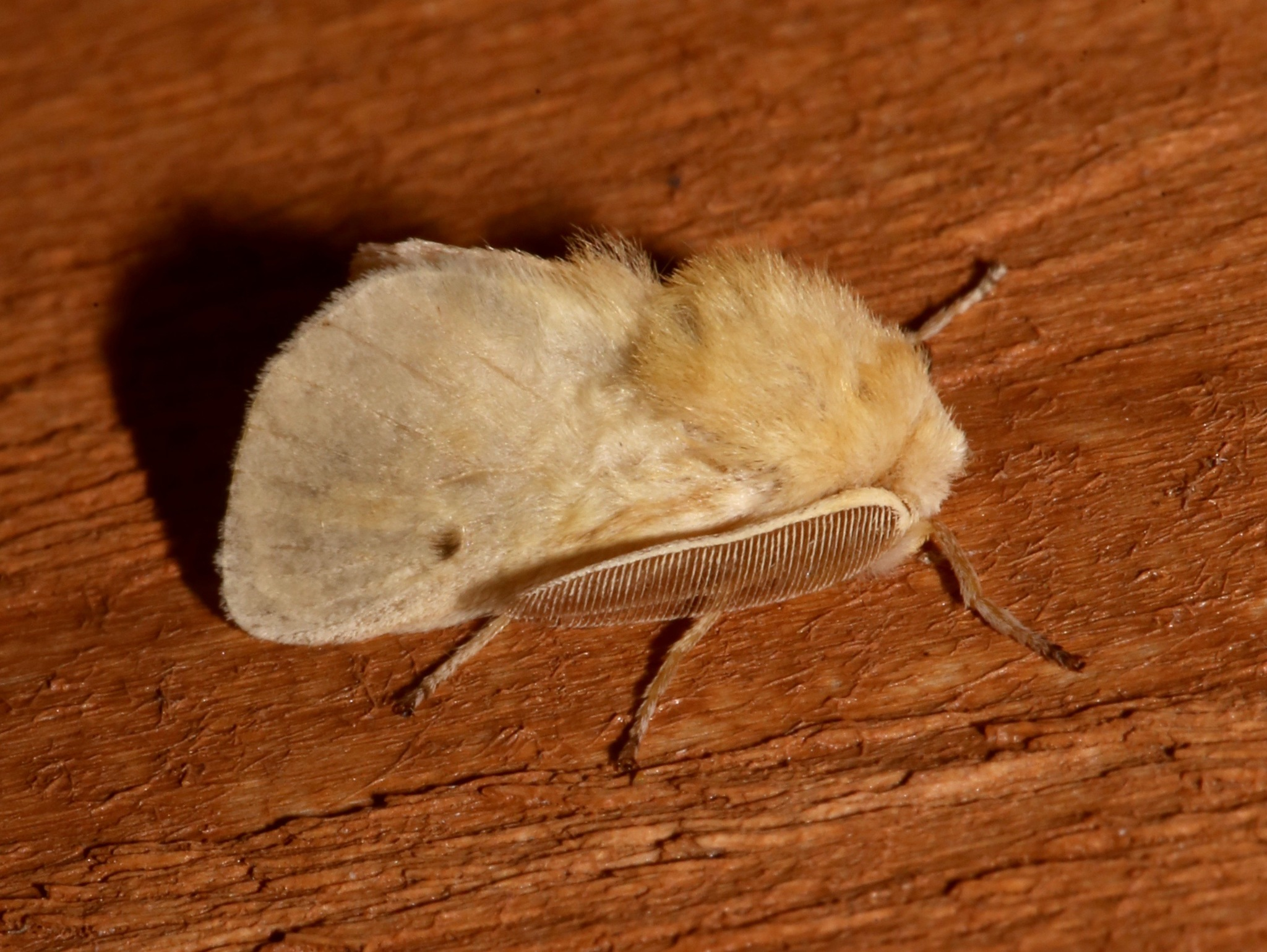

Scientific classification
- Kingdom: Animalia
- Phylum: Arthropoda
- Clade: Pancrustacea
- Class: Insecta
- Order: Lepidoptera
- Family: Megalopygidae
- Genus: Megalopyge
- Species: M. lacyi

Binomial name
- Megalopyge lacyi (Barnes & McDunnough, 1910)

= Megalopyge lacyi =

Species of moth

Megalopyge lacyi is a moth of the family Megalopygidae. It was described by William Barnes and James Halliday McDunnough in 1910.
