= Podalia fuscescens =

Scientific classification
- Kingdom: Animalia
- Phylum: Arthropoda
- Clade: Pancrustacea
- Class: Insecta
- Order: Lepidoptera
- Family: Megalopygidae
- Genus: Podalia
- Species: P. fuscescens

Binomial name
- Podalia fuscescens Walker, 1856

Synonyms
- Podalia megalodia Dyar, 1910; Cistissa expansa Walker, 1862

Species of moth

Podalia fuscescens is a moth of the family Megalopygidae. It was described by Francis Walker in 1856. It is found in Brazil.

The wingspan is about 85 millimetres (3.3 in). The forewings are dark brown streaked with whitish on the costa and in the cell, defining two dark brown rays and a spot at the end of the cell. The whitish streaking predominates beyond the cell and defines an outer row of elliptical spots between the veins, the two lower of which are sagittate (arrowhead shaped), being incised in the basal side by whitish loops, the veins terminally and marginal spottings faintly pale. The hindwings are dark brown, a little paler between the veins outwardly.

The larvae have been recorded feeding on Punica granatum.
