= Podalia contigua =

Scientific classification
- Kingdom: Animalia
- Phylum: Arthropoda
- Clade: Pancrustacea
- Class: Insecta
- Order: Lepidoptera
- Family: Megalopygidae
- Genus: Podalia
- Species: P. contigua

Binomial name
- Podalia contigua (Walker, 1866)

Synonyms
- Alpis contigua Walker, 1866; Alpis salacia Druce, 1887; Megalopyge montana Schaus, 1910

Species of moth

Podalia contigua is a moth of the Megalopygidae family. It was described by Francis Walker in 1866.
