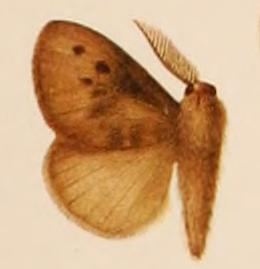
- Podalia marmorata

Scientific classification
- Kingdom: Animalia
- Phylum: Arthropoda
- Clade: Pancrustacea
- Class: Insecta
- Order: Lepidoptera
- Family: Megalopygidae
- Genus: Podalia; Walker, 1856

Synonyms
- Bedalia Dyar, 1910; Cistissa Walker, 1862; Gerontia Schaus, 1904; Gois Dyar, 1905; Malmis Dyar, 1910; Unduzia Dyar, 1914

= Podalia =

Genus of moths

Podalia is a genus of moths in the family Megalopygidae.

== Species ==
- Podalia albescens (Schaus, 1900)
- Podalia amarga (Schaus, 1905)
- Podalia angulata (Hopp, 1922)
- Podalia annulipes (Boisduval, 1833)
- Podalia bolivari Heylaerts, 1884
- Podalia cincinnata (Dognin, 1922)
- Podalia contigua (Walker, 1866)
- Podalia dimidiata (Herrich-Schäffer, 1856)
- Podalia dyari (Joicey & Talbot)
- Podalia fuscescens Walker, 1856
- Podalia gamelia (Druce, 1904)
- Podalia guaya (Schaus, 1927)
- Podalia habitus (H. Edwards, 1887)
- Podalia intermaculata Dognin, 1916
- Podalia lanocrispa E. D. Jones, 1912
- Podalia mallas (Druce, 1899)
- Podalia marmorata (Rothschild, 1910)
- Podalia nivosa E. D. Jones, 1912
- Podalia orsilochus (Cramer, 1775)
- Podalia pedacia (Druce, 1906)
- Podalia pellucens Dognin
- Podalia pedacioides Dognin, 1916
- Podalia prolecta (Hopp, 1935)
- Podalia pseudopedacia Dognin, 1916
- Podalia schadei Schaus, 1924
- Podalia thanatos Schaus, 1905
- Podalia tympania (Druce, 1897)
- Podalia walkerensis Hopp, 1935
- Podalia walkeri (Berg, 1882)
