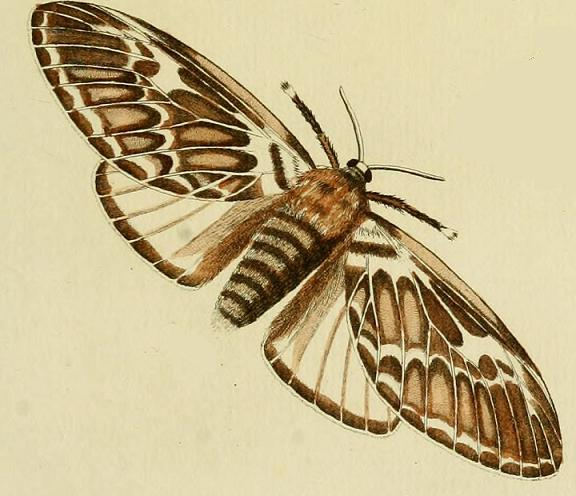

Scientific classification
- Kingdom: Animalia
- Phylum: Arthropoda
- Clade: Pancrustacea
- Class: Insecta
- Order: Lepidoptera
- Family: Megalopygidae
- Genus: Podalia
- Species: P. orsilochus

Binomial name
- Podalia orsilochus (Cramer, 1775)

Synonyms
- Bombyx orsilochus Cramer, 1775; Podalia dorsimacula Walker, 1856; Podalia major Schaus, 1905; Podalia misantla Dyar, 1910; Podalia vesta Walker, 1856

= Podalia orsilochus =

Species of moth

Podalia orsilochus is a moth of the Megalopygidae family. It was described by Pieter Cramer in 1775. It is found in Mexico, Costa Rica, Brazil, Guyana and Venezuela.

The wingspan is 65 mm. The forewings are white, the markings light olivaceous brown. There is a small black spot at the base below the median and a broad median shade, darkest along the upper portion of the cell, crossed by whitish shades between the veins and limited by a broad white post-medial line, which is followed by cuneiform streaks and spots. There is also a terminal row of spots between the veins. The hindwings are white, the space below the cell and inner margin shaded with olivaceous brown. There are also some faint terminal spots.
