= Megalopyge defoliata =

Scientific classification
- Kingdom: Animalia
- Phylum: Arthropoda
- Clade: Pancrustacea
- Class: Insecta
- Order: Lepidoptera
- Family: Megalopygidae
- Genus: Megalopyge
- Species: M. defoliata

Binomial name
- Megalopyge defoliata (Walker, 1855)

Synonyms
- Alpis defoliata Walker, 1855; Gasina agesistrata Druce, 1890; Megalopyge codiopteris Dyar, 1910; Megalopyge trujillo Schaus, 1896

Species of moth

Megalopyge defoliata is a moth of the Megalopygidae family. It was described by Francis Walker in 1855. It is found in Mexico.

The wingspan is 34 mm for males and 50 mm for females. The forewings of the males are brownish grey, with a large white spot at the base, a smaller one at the end of the cell connected with the basal spots by a white line and an outer transverse irregular white band between which and the median nervure the veins are whitish. The fringe is cream color. The hindwings are creamy with the veins and some scales at the base darker. Females are entirely smoky brown with some white scales at the base and near the apex of the forewings.
