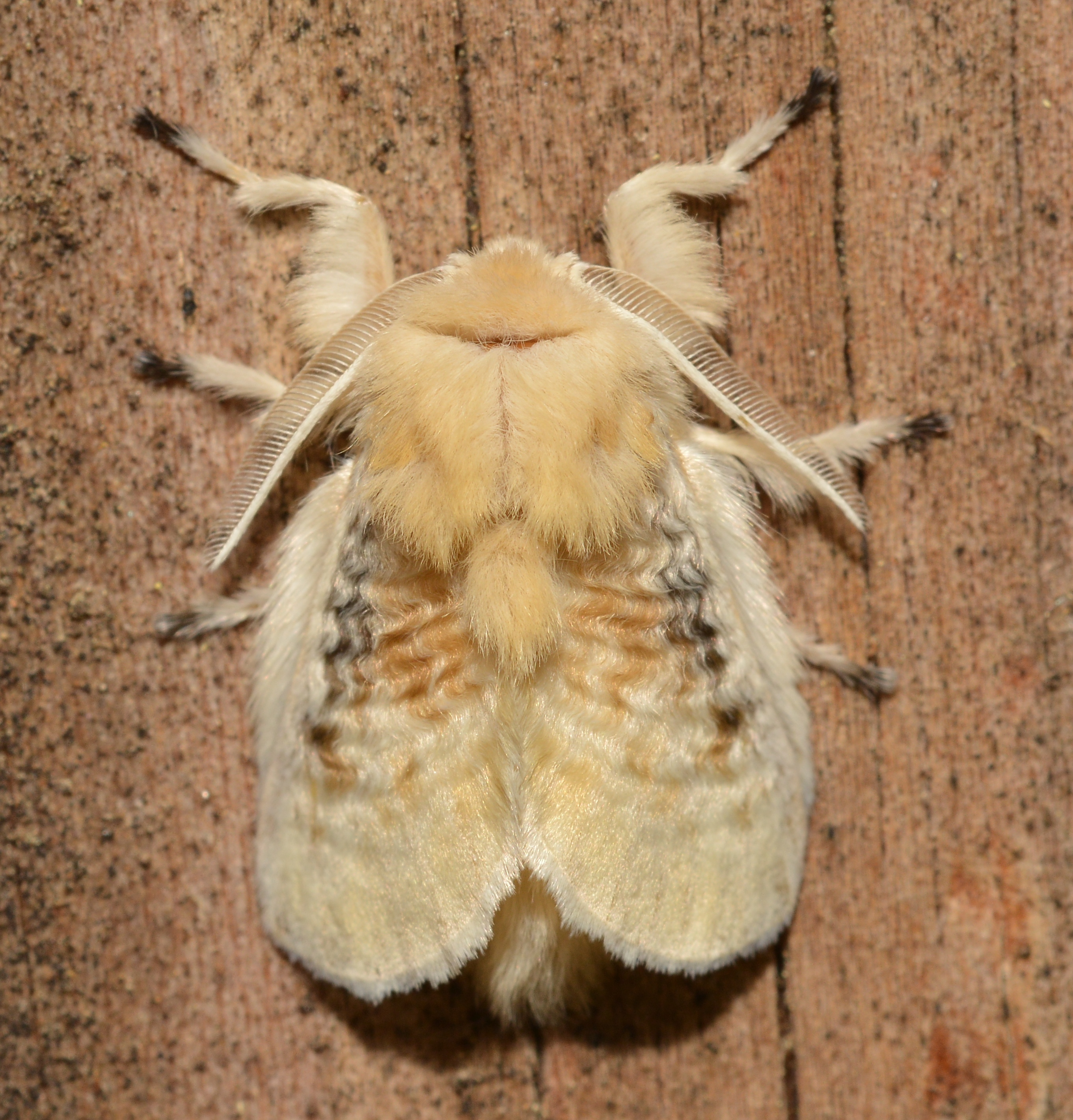

Scientific classification
- Kingdom: Animalia
- Phylum: Arthropoda
- Clade: Pancrustacea
- Class: Insecta
- Order: Lepidoptera
- Family: Megalopygidae
- Genus: Megalopyge
- Species: M. crispata

Binomial name
- Megalopyge crispata (Packard, 1864)

Synonyms
- Lagoa crispata Packard, 1864; Lagoa grisea (Barnes & McDunnough, 1910)

= Megalopyge crispata =

Species of moth

Megalopyge crispata, the black-waved flannel moth, crinkled flannel moth or white flannel moth, is a moth of the Megalopygidae family. It is found along the east coast of the United States, and as far inland as Oklahoma.

The wingspan of this moth is 25–40 mm. Adults are on the wing from May to October. There is one generation per year in the north, two or more in the south.

The caterpillars feed on various trees and shrubs. The caterpillars produce a venom delivered through hollow urticating hairs that can penetrate the skin. This venom can cause pain, a burning sensation, lymphadenopathy, headache and inflammatory dermatitis.
