= Edebessa =

Scientific classification
- Kingdom: Animalia
- Phylum: Arthropoda
- Clade: Pancrustacea
- Class: Insecta
- Order: Lepidoptera
- Family: Megalopygidae
- Genus: Edebessa; Walker, 1856

Genus of moths

Edebessa is a genus of moths in the family Megalopygidae erected by Francis Walker in 1856.

== Species ==
- Edebessa bicolor (Möschler, 1883)
- Edebessa placida (E. D. Jones, 1912)
- Edebessa purens (Walker, 1855)

== Former species ==
- Edebessa circumcincta (Schaus, 1905)
- Edebessa nigrorufa (Walker, 1865)
