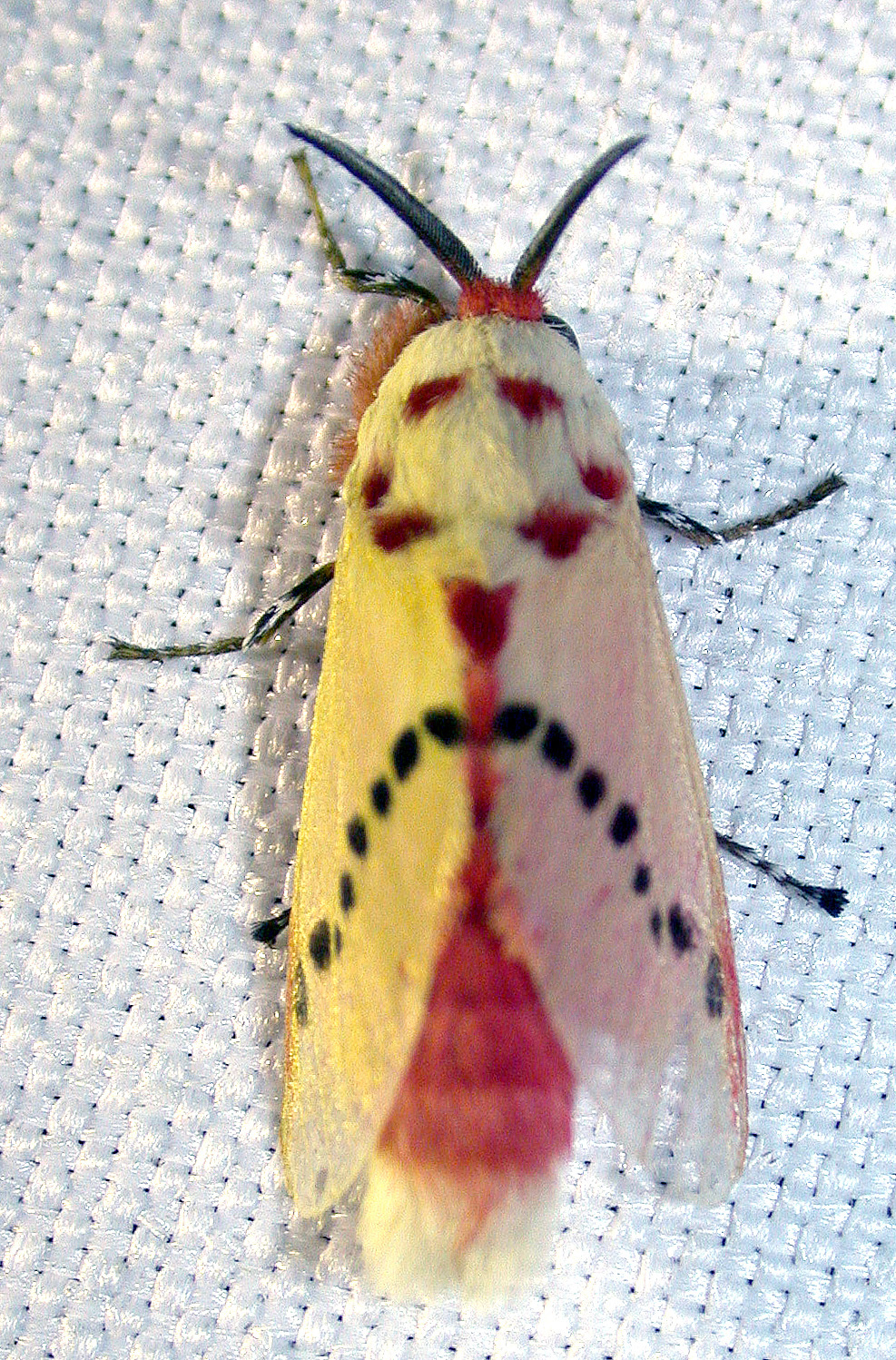

Scientific classification
- Kingdom: Animalia
- Phylum: Arthropoda
- Clade: Pancrustacea
- Class: Insecta
- Order: Lepidoptera
- Family: Megalopygidae
- Genus: Trosia
- Species: T. dimas

Binomial name
- Trosia dimas (Cramer, 1775)

Synonyms
- Phalaena dimas Cramer, 1775; Trosia amarilla Hopp, 1922; Trosia donckieri Dognin, 1924; Trosia flava Dognin; Trosia fumosa Hopp, 1934; Trosia incostata Schaus, 1905; Sciathos metaleuca Druce, 1906; Trosia misda Dyar, 1910; Trosia nigra Hopp, 1932; Trosia obsolescens Dyar, 1899; Trosia rosita Schaus, 1920; Trosia tolimata Dognin, 1922; Bombyx tricolora Fabricius, 1787

= Trosia dimas =

Species of moth

Trosia dimas, the rosy ermine, is a moth in the family Megalopygidae. It is found in Colombia, Venezuela, Ecuador, Brazil, and Peru.

== Taxonomy ==
The first description of this species was by Pieter Cramer in 1775, who named it Bombyx dimas. Subsequent authors placed it in the genera Chrysauge, Idalus, and Sciathos until Harrison Dyar, following Hübner in 1822, assigned it to Trosia, where it has remained.

== Description ==
This species has a wingspan of about 34 millimetres (1.3 in). The head, abdomen, and legs are reddish and the tarsi black, spotted with white. The collar and thorax are yellowish buff, the latter spotted with red. The forewings are greenish yellow, with a postmedial row of black spots. The hindwings are roseate. The underside is dull roseate. In this species, the costa of the forewings is of the same color as the wing.

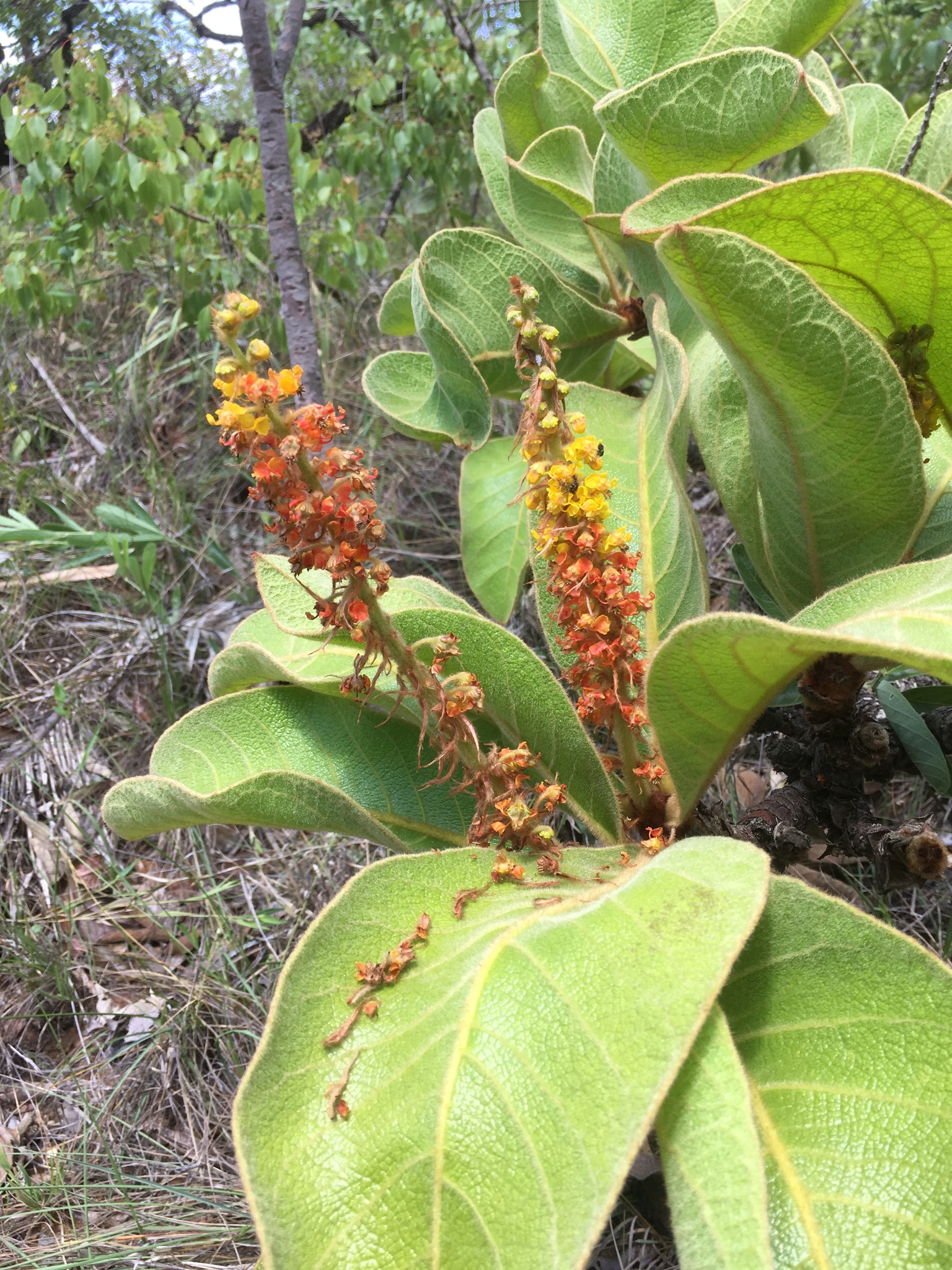
Byrsonima coccolobifolia

== Habitat ==
Trosia dimas is found in rainforests and cloud-forest at altitudes between 300 and 1,700 meters (980 and 5,580 ft). Byrsonima coccolobifolia is the host plant of Trosia dimas.

== Range ==
Trosia dimas has been observed in Colombia, Venezuela, Ecuador, Brazil and Peru. Observations recorded in various collections and citizen science initiatives suggest the range where this species occurs is from South America to North America
