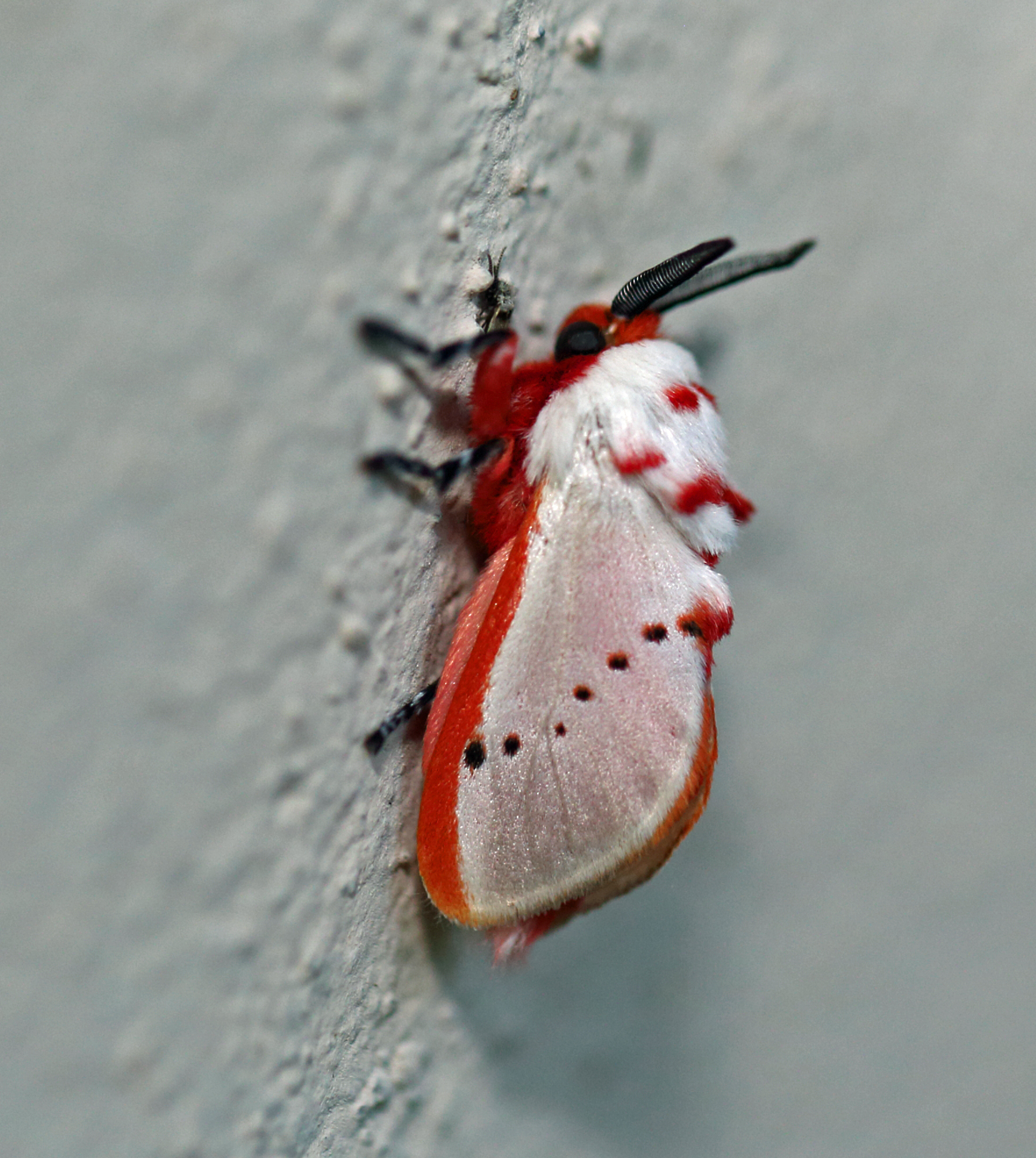

Scientific classification
- Kingdom: Animalia
- Phylum: Arthropoda
- Clade: Pancrustacea
- Class: Insecta
- Order: Lepidoptera
- Family: Megalopygidae
- Genus: Trosia
- Species: T. semirufa

Binomial name
- Trosia semirufa (Druce, 1906)

= Trosia semirufa =

Species of moth

Trosia semirufa, the strawberry cake moth is a moth of the Megalopygidae family. It was first described by Druce in 1906.

== Description ==
Strawberry cake moths are best known for their coral-orange coloured termens. (The bottom of their forewings.) This is a feature them visually distinct from the closely-related Trosia rufa.

As an adult, the moth frequently consumes nectars, sap, and fruits such as honeydew melon. They are not reported to be harmful to humans.

== Taxonomy ==
Like most members in the genus, the strawberry cake moth is mostly undistinguishable from most other members, apart from their genitalia.
