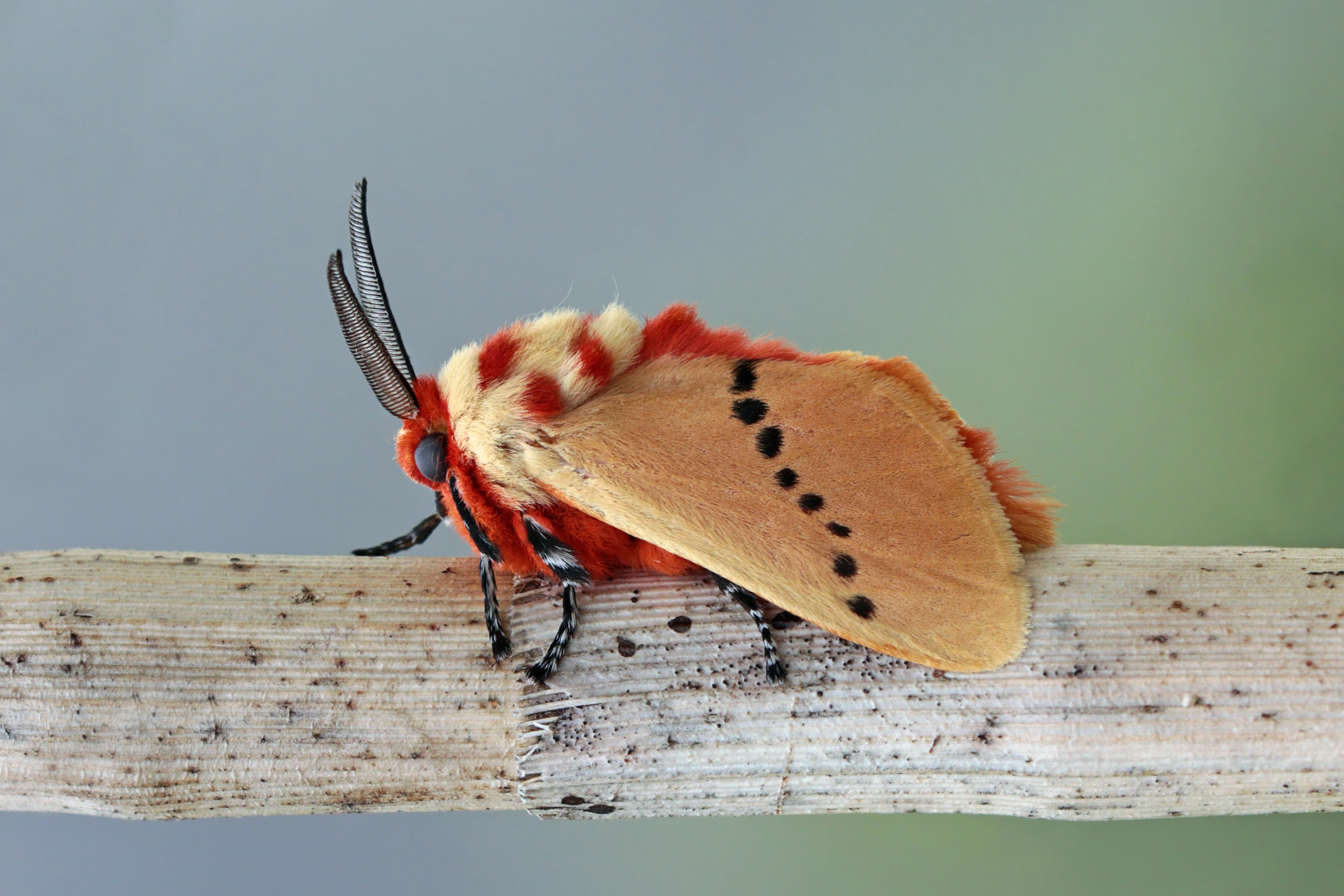
- Trosia nigropunctigera Mount Totumas cloud forest, Panama
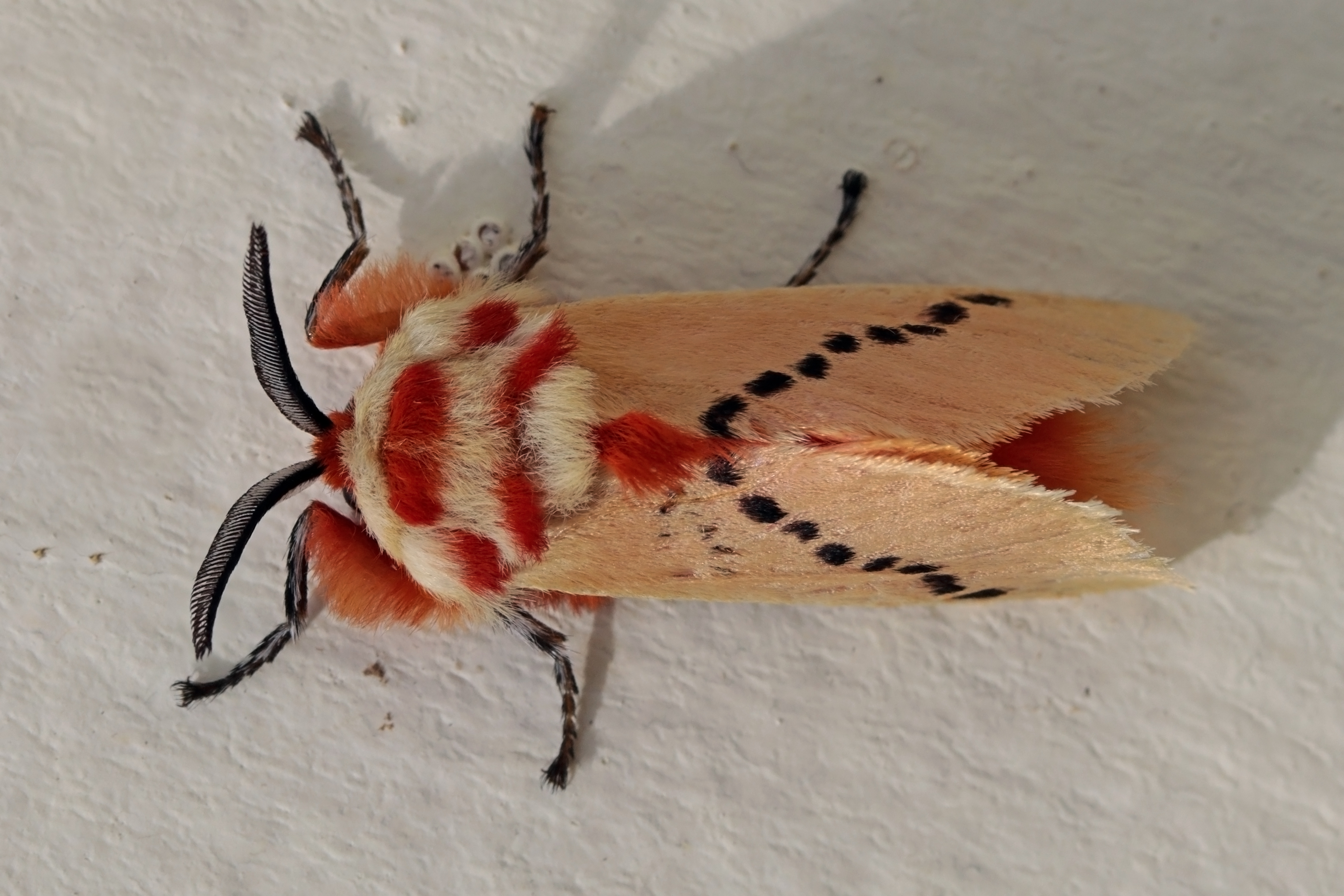

Scientific classification
- Kingdom: Animalia
- Phylum: Arthropoda
- Clade: Pancrustacea
- Class: Insecta
- Order: Lepidoptera
- Family: Megalopygidae
- Genus: Trosia; Hübner, 1820

Synonyms
- Alimera Möschler, 1883; Isochroma Felder, 1874; Langucys Butler, 1878; Sarothroma Herrich-Schäffer, 1855; Sciathos Walker, 1855

= Trosia =

Genus of moths

Trosia is a genus of moths in the family Megalopygidae described by Jacob Hübner in 1820.

== Species ==
- Trosia acea Hopp, 1930
- Trosia bicolor (Möschler, 1883)
- Trosia circumcincta (Schaus, 1905)
- Trosia dimas (Cramer, 1775)
- Trosia fallax (Felder, 1874)
- Trosia flavida Dognin, 1911
- Trosia nigropuncta Druce, 1909
- Trosia nigropunctigera D. S. Fletcher, 1982
- Trosia nigrorufa (Walker, 1865)
- Trosia ochracea Hopp, 1922
- Trosia pellucida (Möschler, 1877)
- Trosia pulla Forbes, 1942
- Trosia roseipuncta (Druce, 1906)
- Trosia rufa (E. D. Jones, 1912)
- Trosia semirufa (Druce, 1906)
- Trosia xinga (Dognin, 1922)
- Trosia zernyi Hopp, 1930
- Trosia zikani Hopp, 1922
