= Trosia flavida =

Scientific classification
- Kingdom: Animalia
- Phylum: Arthropoda
- Clade: Pancrustacea
- Class: Insecta
- Order: Lepidoptera
- Family: Megalopygidae
- Genus: Trosia
- Species: T. flavida

Binomial name
- Trosia flavida Dognin, 1911

Species of moth

Trosia flavida is a moth of the Megalopygidae family. It was described by Paul Dognin in 1911.
