= Edebessa placida =

Scientific classification
- Kingdom: Animalia
- Phylum: Arthropoda
- Clade: Pancrustacea
- Class: Insecta
- Order: Lepidoptera
- Family: Megalopygidae
- Genus: Edebessa
- Species: E. placida

Binomial name
- Edebessa placida E. D. Jones, 1912

Species of moth

Edebessa placida is a moth of the family Megalopygidae. It was described by E. Dukinfield Jones in 1912. It is found in Brazil.

The wingspan is about 30 mm. The forewings are light fuscous, with the base pinkish white followed by a suffused fuscous shade, more defined at the base of the cell. The costa is dark fuscous at the base, fading to pale fuscous at the apex and the subcostal area is creamy white. The termen is narrowly creamy white from the tornus to vein 5. The hindwings are pale fuscous, with the costal area creamy.
