= Trosia zikani =

Scientific classification
- Kingdom: Animalia
- Phylum: Arthropoda
- Clade: Pancrustacea
- Class: Insecta
- Order: Lepidoptera
- Family: Megalopygidae
- Genus: Trosia
- Species: T. zikani

Binomial name
- Trosia zikani Hopp, 1922

Species of moth

Trosia zikani is a moth of the family Megalopygidae. It was described by Walter Hopp in 1922. This moth is found in Brazil.

The wingspan is 35 mm. The wings are semi-hyaline grey-brown with darker veins.
