= Trosia pulla =

Scientific classification
- Kingdom: Animalia
- Phylum: Arthropoda
- Clade: Pancrustacea
- Class: Insecta
- Order: Lepidoptera
- Family: Megalopygidae
- Genus: Trosia
- Species: T. pulla

Binomial name
- Trosia pulla Forbes, 1942

Species of moth

Trosia pulla is a moth of the family Megalopygidae. It was described by William Trowbridge Merrifield Forbes in 1942.
