= Chrysauge unicolor =

Scientific classification
- Domain: Eukaryota
- Kingdom: Animalia
- Phylum: Arthropoda
- Class: Insecta
- Order: Lepidoptera
- Family: Pyralidae
- Genus: Chrysauge
- Species: C. unicolor

Binomial name
- Chrysauge unicolor Berg, 1876

Species of moth

Chrysauge unicolor is a species of snout moth in the genus Chrysauge. It was described by Carlos Berg in 1876 and is found in Argentina and Venezuela.
