= Trosia fallax =

Scientific classification
- Kingdom: Animalia
- Phylum: Arthropoda
- Clade: Pancrustacea
- Class: Insecta
- Order: Lepidoptera
- Family: Megalopygidae
- Genus: Trosia
- Species: T. fallax

Binomial name
- Trosia fallax (Felder, 1874)

Species of moth

Trosia fallax is a moth of the Megalopygidae family. It was described by Felder in 1874.
