= Trosia roseipuncta =

Scientific classification
- Kingdom: Animalia
- Phylum: Arthropoda
- Clade: Pancrustacea
- Class: Insecta
- Order: Lepidoptera
- Family: Megalopygidae
- Genus: Trosia
- Species: T. roseipuncta

Binomial name
- Trosia roseipuncta (Druce, 1906)

Species of moth

Trosia roseipuncta is a moth of the Megalopygidae family. It was described by Druce in 1906.
