= Edebessa purens =

Scientific classification
- Kingdom: Animalia
- Phylum: Arthropoda
- Clade: Pancrustacea
- Class: Insecta
- Order: Lepidoptera
- Family: Megalopygidae
- Genus: Edebessa
- Species: E. purens

Binomial name
- Edebessa purens Walker, 1855

Species of moth

Edebessa purens is a moth of the family Megalopygidae. It was described by Francis Walker in 1855. It is found in Brazil.
