= Trosia zernyi =

Scientific classification
- Kingdom: Animalia
- Phylum: Arthropoda
- Clade: Pancrustacea
- Class: Insecta
- Order: Lepidoptera
- Family: Megalopygidae
- Genus: Trosia
- Species: T. zernyi

Binomial name
- Trosia zernyi Hopp, 1930

Species of moth

Trosia zernyi is a moth of the family Megalopygidae. It was described by Walter Hopp in 1930. It is found in Brazil.
