= Chrysauge eutelia =

Scientific classification
- Domain: Eukaryota
- Kingdom: Animalia
- Phylum: Arthropoda
- Class: Insecta
- Order: Lepidoptera
- Family: Pyralidae
- Genus: Chrysauge
- Species: C. eutelia

Binomial name
- Chrysauge eutelia H. Druce, 1903

Species of moth

Chrysauge eutelia is a species of snout moth in the genus Chrysauge. It was described by Herbert Druce in 1903. It is found in Brazil.
