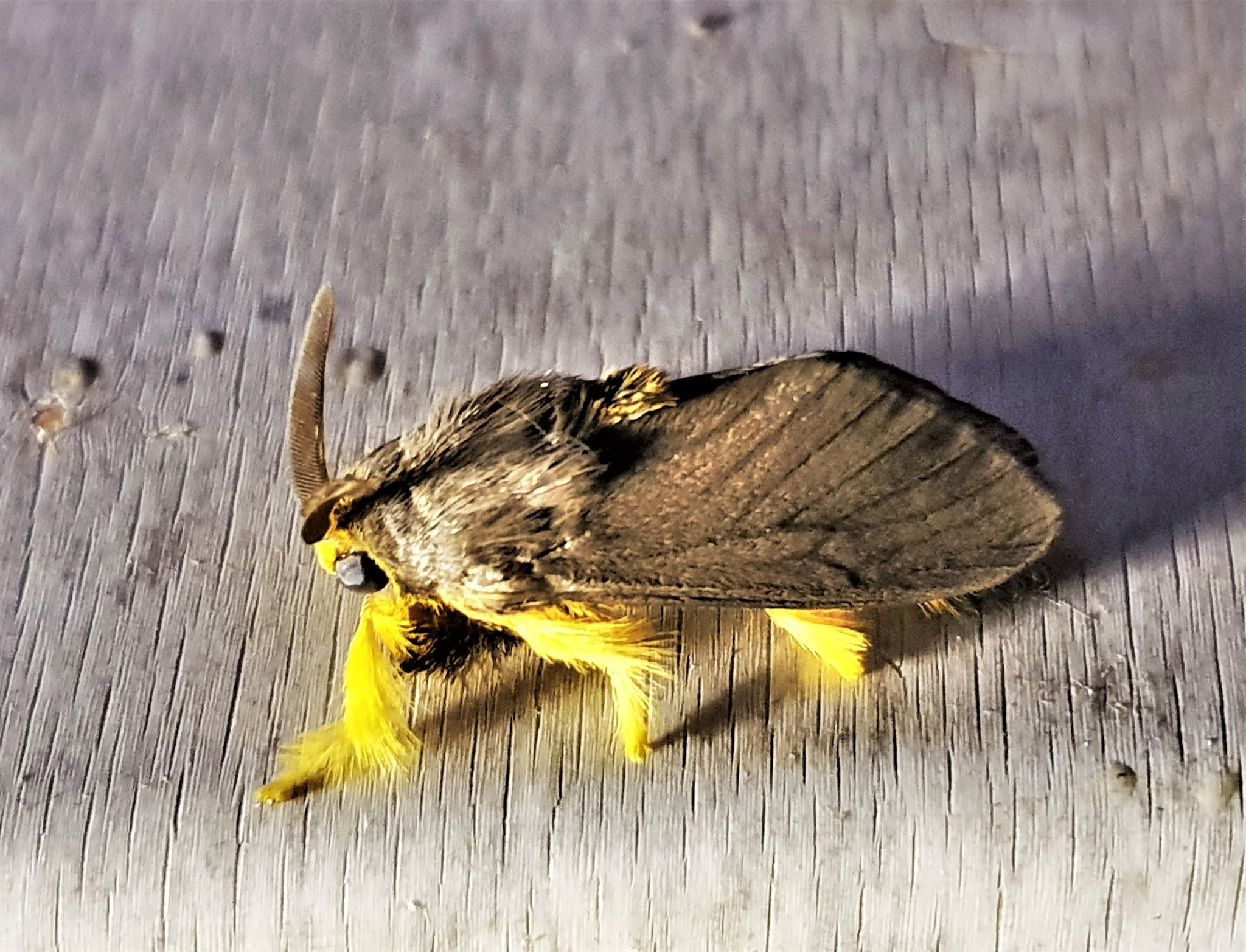

Scientific classification
- Kingdom: Animalia
- Phylum: Arthropoda
- Clade: Pancrustacea
- Class: Insecta
- Order: Lepidoptera
- Family: Megalopygidae
- Genus: Trosia
- Species: T. pellucida

Binomial name
- Trosia pellucida (Möschler, 1877)

Synonyms
- Chrysopype pellucida Möschler, 1877; Podalia darca Dyar, 1910

= Trosia pellucida =

Species of moth

Trosia pellucida is a moth of the Megalopygidae family. It was described by Heinrich Benno Möschler in 1877. It is found in Brazil and French Guiana.

The wingspan is about 35 mm for males and 55 mm for females. Adults are dark brown, the wings rather thinly scaled. The abdomen with dark yellow hair above, but the segments banded with blackish. The abdomen below, legs, pectus, and front of the head are yellow.
