= Chrysauge catenulata =

Scientific classification
- Domain: Eukaryota
- Kingdom: Animalia
- Phylum: Arthropoda
- Class: Insecta
- Order: Lepidoptera
- Family: Pyralidae
- Genus: Chrysauge
- Species: C. catenulata

Binomial name
- Chrysauge catenulata Warren, 1891

Species of moth

Chrysauge catenulata is a species of snout moth in the genus Chrysauge. It was described by Warren in 1891. It is found in Guyana.
