= Chrysauge kadenii =

Scientific classification
- Domain: Eukaryota
- Kingdom: Animalia
- Phylum: Arthropoda
- Class: Insecta
- Order: Lepidoptera
- Family: Pyralidae
- Genus: Chrysauge
- Species: C. kadenii

Binomial name
- Chrysauge kadenii Lederer, 1863

Species of moth

Chrysauge kadenii is a species of snout moth in the genus Chrysauge. It was described by Julius Lederer, 1863. It is found in Brazil.
