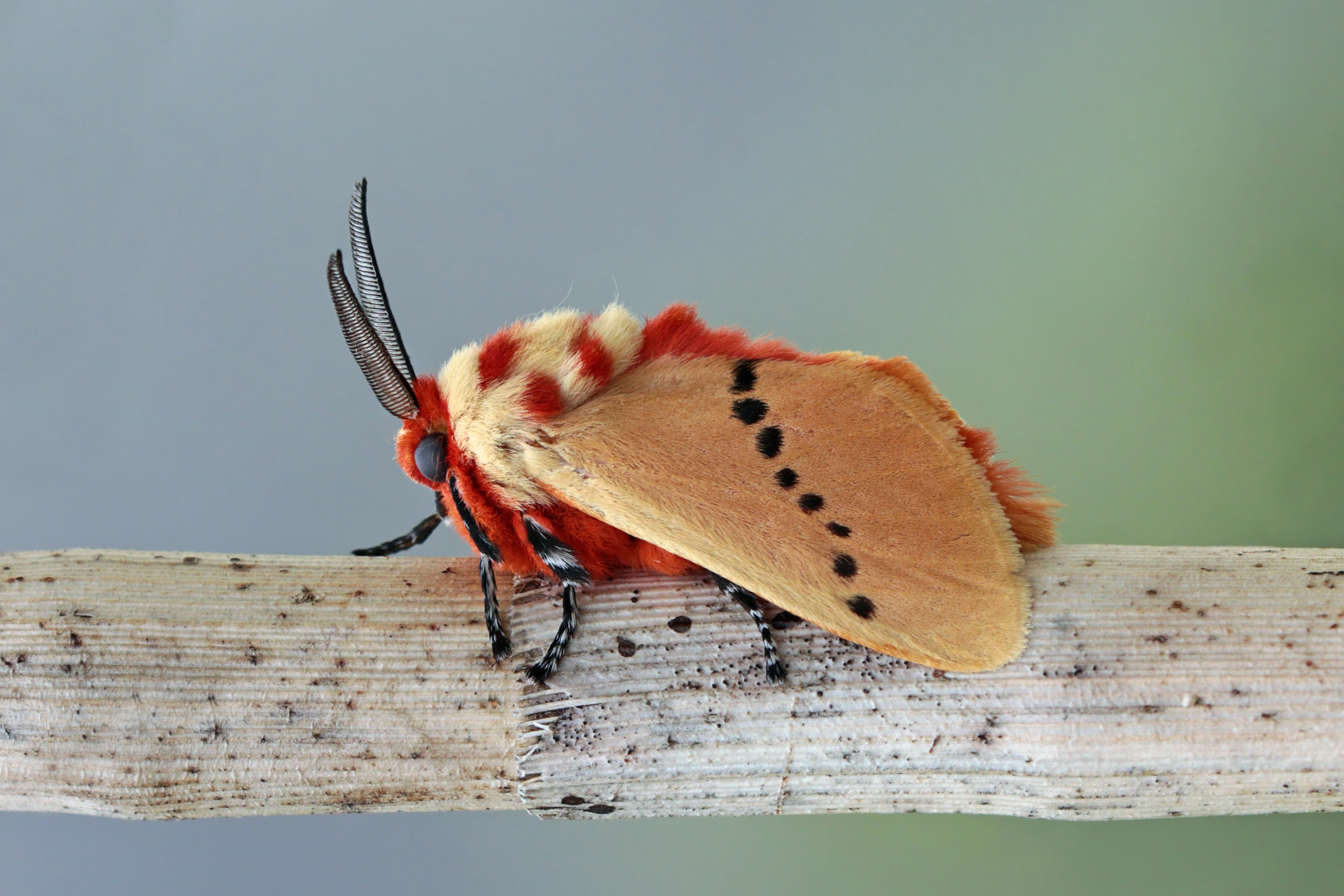

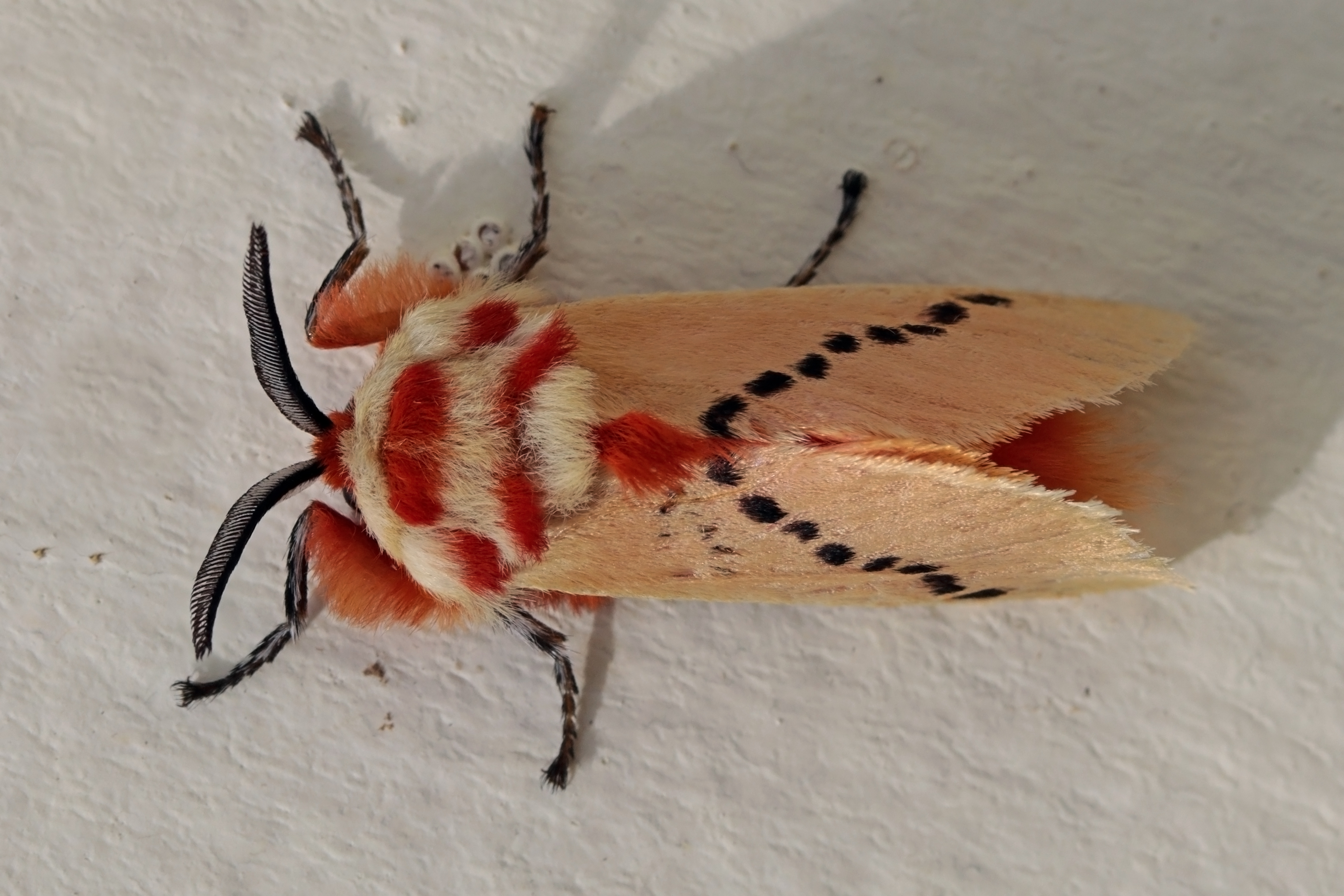
- Mount Totumas cloud forest, Panama

Scientific classification
- Kingdom: Animalia
- Phylum: Arthropoda
- Class: Insecta
- Order: Lepidoptera
- Family: Megalopygidae
- Genus: Trosia
- Species: T. nigropunctigera

Binomial name
- Trosia nigropunctigera D. S. Fletcher, 1982

= Trosia nigropunctigera =

Species of moth

Trosia nigropunctigera, commonly known as the rosy ermine moth or rosy flannel moth, is a lepidopteran in the family Megalopygidae native to the Neotropics. These moths have a wingspan of 45-60mm, and are distributed across Costa Rica, Panama, Colombia, Venezuela, Guyana, Ecuador and Peru. The species was first described by David Stephen Fletcher in 1982.

== Description ==
The thorax of Trosia nigropunctigera is densely clad with short hairs and is white or straw-coloured with six distinct red spots. The forewings are white or pale straw colour with a single row of black spots running across parallel with the rear margin. The head, abdomen, legs, and forewings are red.

== Distribution and habitat ==
Trosia nigropunctigera is native to the rainforests and cloudforests of Costa Rica, Panama, Colombia, Venezuela, Guyana, Ecuador and Peru. It is found at altitudes of between about 400 and 1,200 m (1,300 and 3,900 ft).
