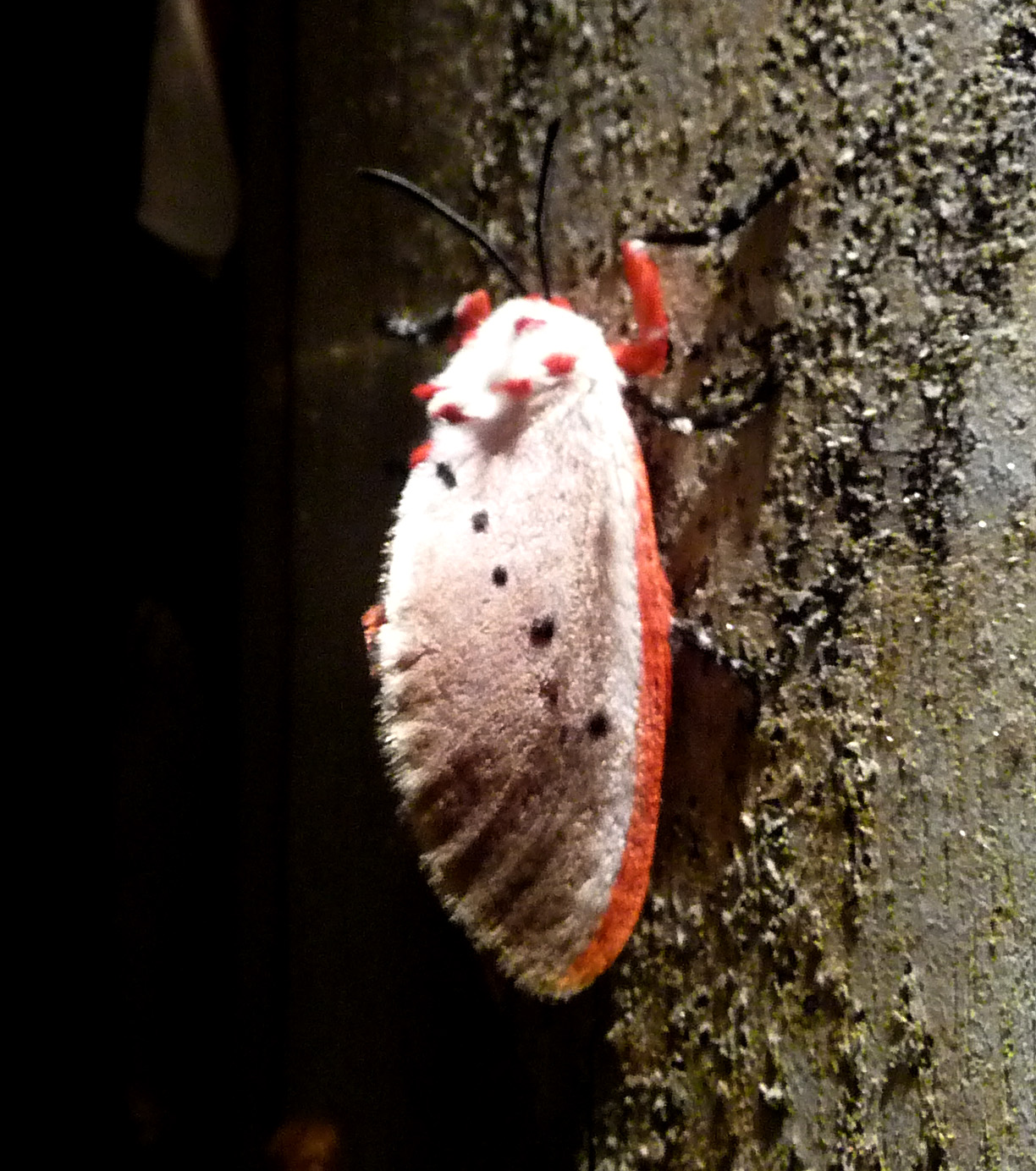

Scientific classification
- Kingdom: Animalia
- Phylum: Arthropoda
- Clade: Pancrustacea
- Class: Insecta
- Order: Lepidoptera
- Family: Megalopygidae
- Genus: Trosia
- Species: T. nigropuncta

Binomial name
- Trosia nigropuncta Druce, 1909

= Trosia nigropuncta =

Species of moth

Trosia nigropuncta is a moth of the Megalopygidae family. It was described by Druce in 1909.
