= Trosia xinga =

Scientific classification
- Kingdom: Animalia
- Phylum: Arthropoda
- Clade: Pancrustacea
- Class: Insecta
- Order: Lepidoptera
- Family: Megalopygidae
- Genus: Trosia
- Species: T. xinga

Binomial name
- Trosia xinga (Dognin, 1922)

Species of moth

Trosia xinga is a moth of the Megalopygidae family. It was described by Paul Dognin in 1922.
