= Trosia ochracea =

Scientific classification
- Kingdom: Animalia
- Phylum: Arthropoda
- Clade: Pancrustacea
- Class: Insecta
- Order: Lepidoptera
- Family: Megalopygidae
- Genus: Trosia
- Species: T. ochracea

Binomial name
- Trosia ochracea Hopp, 1922

Species of moth

Trosia ochracea is a moth of the family Megalopygidae, first described by Walter Hopp in 1922. It is found in Brazil.

The wingspan is 28 mm. Adults are similar to Thoscora acca, but the forewings are bright pale brown, with the veins, costa and fringe somewhat darker. The hindwings are pale ochreous yellow.
