= Chrysauge bifasciata =

Scientific classification
- Kingdom: Animalia
- Phylum: Arthropoda
- Clade: Pancrustacea
- Class: Insecta
- Order: Lepidoptera
- Family: Pyralidae
- Genus: Chrysauge
- Species: C. bifasciata

Binomial name
- Chrysauge bifasciata Walker, 1854

Species of moth

Chrysauge bifasciata is a species of snout moth in the genus Chrysauge. It was described by Francis Walker in 1854. It is found in Brazil.
