= Chrysauge flavelata =

Scientific classification
- Domain: Eukaryota
- Kingdom: Animalia
- Phylum: Arthropoda
- Class: Insecta
- Order: Lepidoptera
- Family: Pyralidae
- Genus: Chrysauge
- Species: C. flavelata

Binomial name
- Chrysauge flavelata (Stoll in Cramer & Stoll, 1781)

Synonyms
- Phalaena flavelata Stoll in Cramer & Stoll, 1781; Chrysauge divida Hübner, 1823; Candisa auriflavalis Walker, 1866; Chrysauge chrysomelas Walker; Chrysauge jonesalis Schaus, 1904

Species of moth

Chrysauge flavelata is a species of snout moth in the genus Chrysauge. It was described by Stoll in 1781, and is known from Suriname, Venezuela and Brazil (Para).
