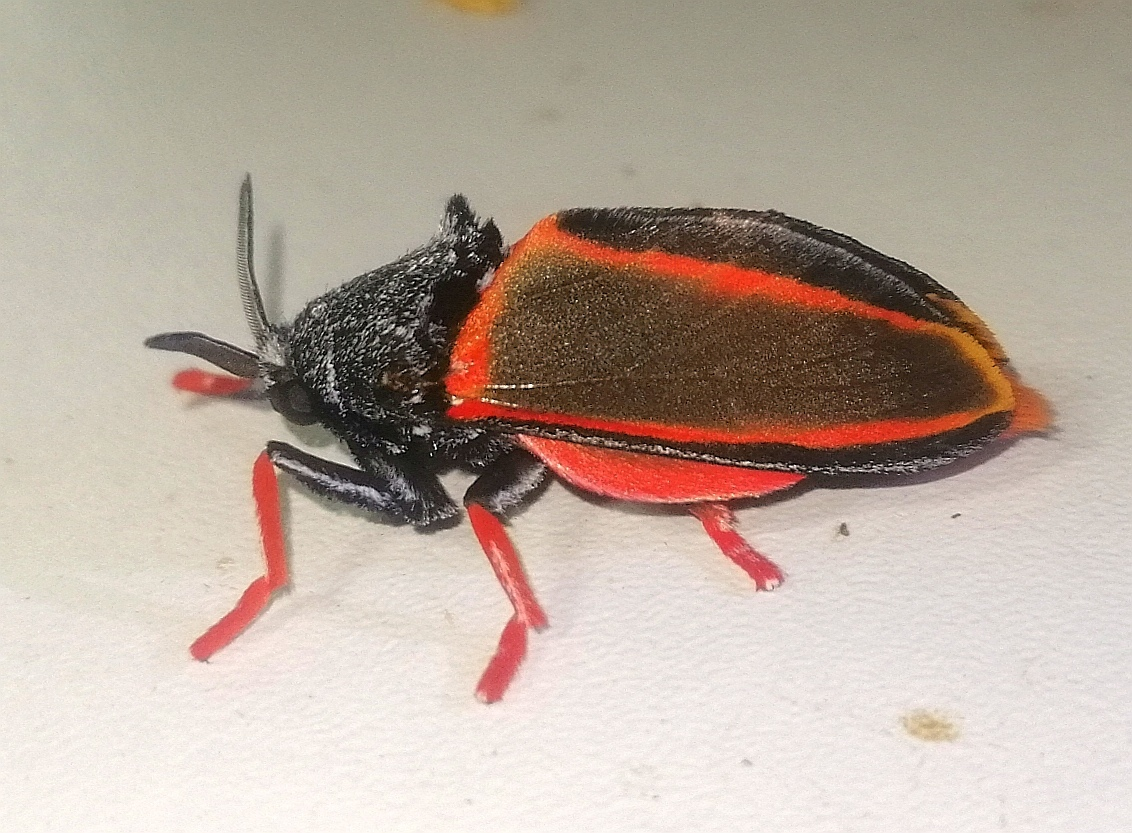

Scientific classification
- Kingdom: Animalia
- Phylum: Arthropoda
- Clade: Pancrustacea
- Class: Insecta
- Order: Lepidoptera
- Family: Megalopygidae
- Genus: Trosia
- Species: T. circumcincta

Binomial name
- Trosia circumcincta (Schaus, 1905)

Synonyms
- Edebessa circumcincta Schaus, 1905

= Trosia circumcincta =

Species of moth

Trosia circumcincta is a moth of the Megalopygidae family. It was described by William Schaus in 1905. It is found in French Guiana.

The wingspan is about 41 mm. The forewings are dark mouse grey with a red line along the basal third of the costa, then below the costa and along vein 7 to the apex. Another red line is found from the base of the costa to the inner margin near the angle, then up to vein 5 on the extreme margin. The outer two-thirds of the costa and the outer margin below vein 5 are black. The fringe between vein 5 and the apex is yellowish. The hindwings are blackish, with the outer margin broadly red, except a black line on the extreme margin and the fringe between vein 3 and the anal angle.
