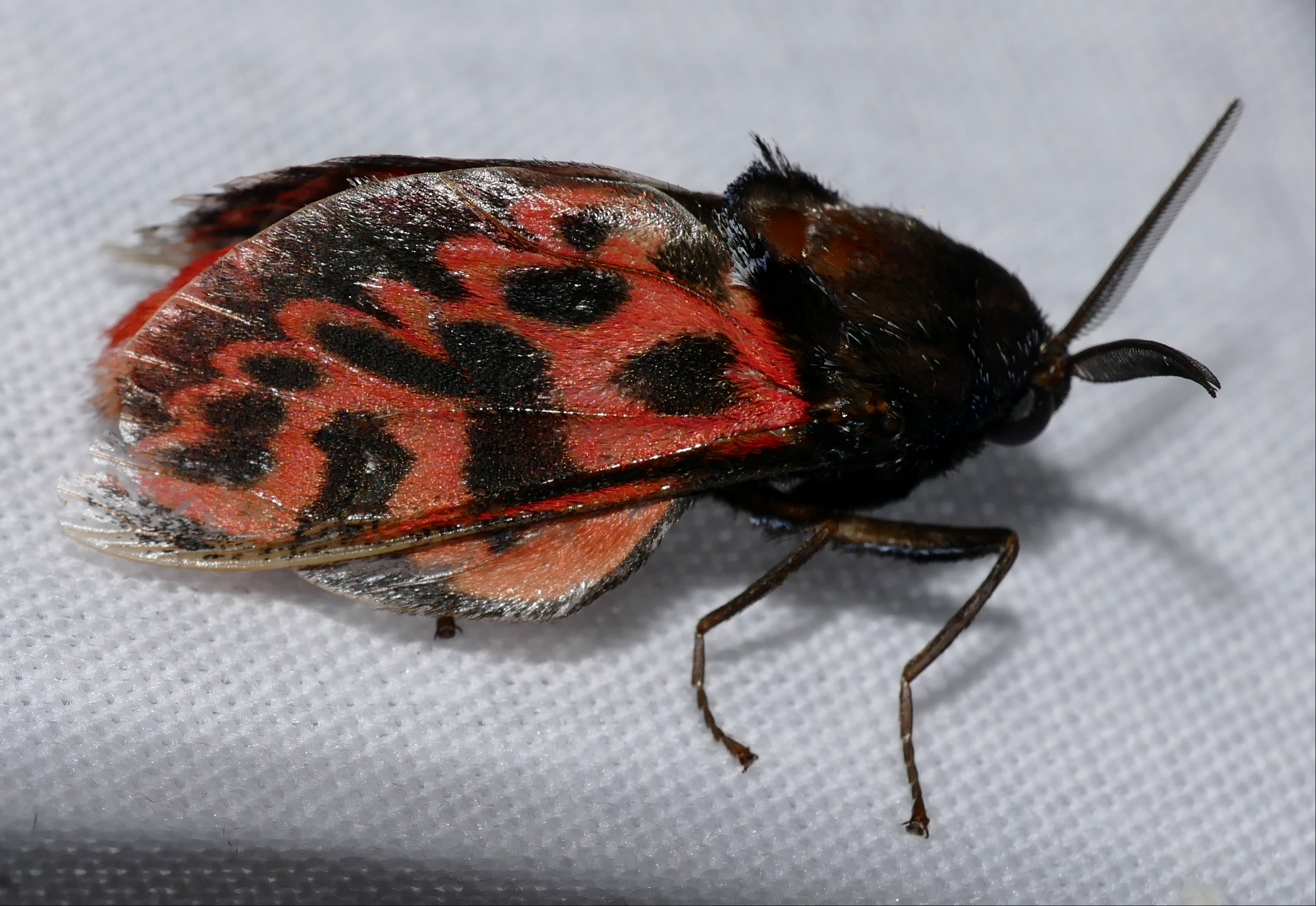

Scientific classification
- Kingdom: Animalia
- Phylum: Arthropoda
- Clade: Pancrustacea
- Class: Insecta
- Order: Lepidoptera
- Family: Megalopygidae
- Genus: Edebessa
- Species: E. bicolor

Binomial name
- Edebessa bicolor (Möschler, 1883)

Synonyms
- Alimera bicolor Möschler, 1883; Trosia bicolor; Edebessa languciata Schaus, 1905

= Edebessa bicolor =

Species of moth

Edebessa bicolor is a moth of the Megalopygidae family. It was described by Heinrich Benno Möschler in 1883. It is found in Suriname and French Guiana.

The wingspan is about 57 mm. The wings are black with red markings. There is a large annular spot at the base of the forewings, from the subcostal to the submedian. There is also a quadrate spot from vein 3 to the costa, filled in with black, which is crossed by the discocellular. A red line runs from the outer costal angle of this spot to the yellow apex, then forming large subterminal lunules between the veins to vein 3, and below it twice angled to the submedian where it joins the basal spot. There is a medial lunular spot on the inner margin below the submedian. The cell on the hindwings is red and from the lower angle of the cell, a line extends towards the costa at its middle, following below the costa to near the apex and forming a subterminal lunular line along the outer margin.
