= Trosia rufa =

Scientific classification
- Kingdom: Animalia
- Phylum: Arthropoda
- Clade: Pancrustacea
- Class: Insecta
- Order: Lepidoptera
- Family: Megalopygidae
- Genus: Trosia
- Species: T. rufa

Binomial name
- Trosia rufa (E. D. Jones, 1912)

Synonyms
- Edebessa rufa E. D. Jones, 1912

Species of moth

Trosia rufa is a moth of the family Megalopygidae. It was described by E. Dukinfield Jones in 1912. It is found in Brazil.

The wingspan is about 28 mm. The forewings are red brown and thinly scaled. There is a postmedial diffused fuscous band, broad beyond the cell, more defined and broken into three spots near the inner margin. The hindwings are bright brick red.
