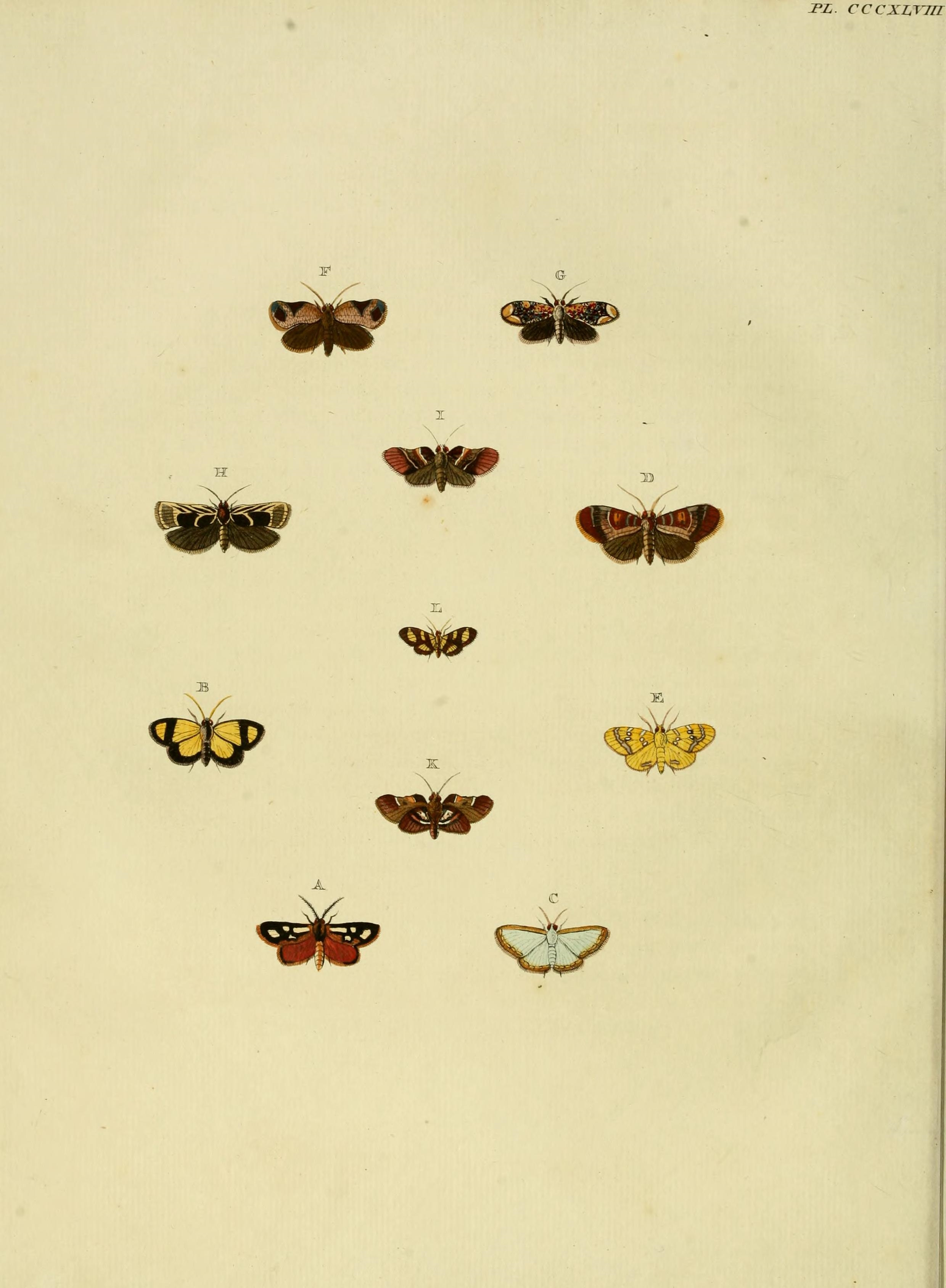

Scientific classification
- Kingdom: Animalia
- Phylum: Arthropoda
- Clade: Pancrustacea
- Class: Insecta
- Order: Lepidoptera
- Family: Pyralidae
- Subfamily: Chrysauginae
- Genus: Chrysauge; Hübner, 1823

Synonyms
- Candisa Walker, 1866

= Chrysauge =

Genus of moths

Chrysauge is a genus of snout moths. It was described by Jacob Hübner in 1823.

== Species ==
- Chrysauge bifasciata Walker, 1854
- Chrysauge catenulata Warren, 1891
- Chrysauge eutelia Druce, 1903
- Chrysauge flavelata (Stoll in Cramer & Stoll, 1781)
- Chrysauge kadenii Lederer, 1863
- Chrysauge latifasciata Warren, 1891
- Chrysauge unicolor Berg, 1876
