= Trosia nigrorufa =

Scientific classification
- Kingdom: Animalia
- Phylum: Arthropoda
- Clade: Pancrustacea
- Class: Insecta
- Order: Lepidoptera
- Family: Megalopygidae
- Genus: Trosia
- Species: T. nigrorufa

Binomial name
- Trosia nigrorufa (Walker, 1865)

Synonyms
- Glanycus nigrorufus Walker, 1865

Species of moth

Trosia nigrorufa is a moth of the family Megalopygidae. It was described by Francis Walker in 1865. It is found in Peru, Colombia and French Guiana.
